= Carleton, Penrith =

Settlement in Cumbria, England

Coordinates: 54.660°N 2.730°W

Carleton
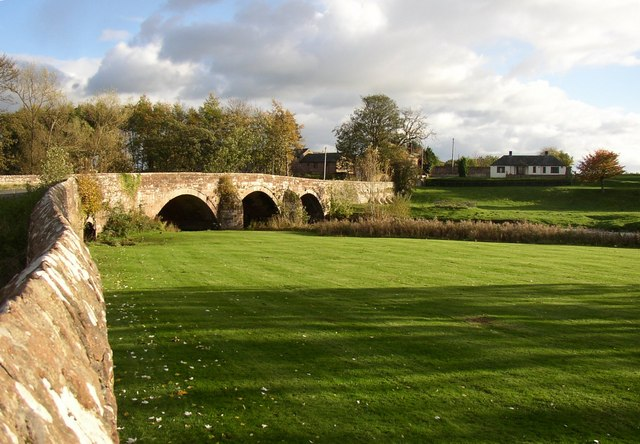
- Brougham Castle Bridge, Carleton, Penrith

- Location in Eden, Cumbria Location within Cumbria
- OS grid reference: NY529296
- Civil parish: Penrith
- Unitary authority: Westmorland and Furness
- Ceremonial county: Cumbria
- Region: North West
- Country: England
- Sovereign state: United Kingdom
- Post town: PENRITH
- Postcode district: CA11
- Dialling code: 01768
- Police: Cumbria
- Fire: Cumbria
- Ambulance: North West
- UK Parliament: Penrith and Solway

Carleton is a suburb of the town of Penrith, in the Westmorland and Furness unitary authority area of the ceremonial county of Cumbria, England. It was formerly a separate small village or hamlet one mile east of the centre of Penrith. In the twentieth and twenty-first centuries, it has seen a huge growth in housing.

== Toponymy ==
The name 'Carleton' originates from Old English 'ceorl' or 'carle', 'charle', meaning 'farmer' or 'free peasant' and 'tūn' a 'vill' or 'settlement'; its meaning therefore is "settlement of the farmers". The name Carleton, Carlton or Charlton is quite common in England, the nearest other example being the village of Carleton on the outskirts of Carlisle. Two more in Cumbria are one close to Egremont at Drigg and another possible one near Cockermouth. All are located near to what were feudal estate centres. It has been suggested that these settlements pre-dated the Norman conquest, but this has been challenged and some, at least, may be Norman in nature.

== Carleton Village ==
Carleton Village itself is a small line of houses along one side of the A686 road that forms part of the boundary of the town's built up area. The Cross Keys Inn, an eighteenth century listed building, is at the junction of the A686 and Carleton Road (formerly the A66 road) and a lane leading down to Frenchfield. The inn was for a short time in the early 21st century known as the Carleton Inn and was closed between 2004 and 2008.

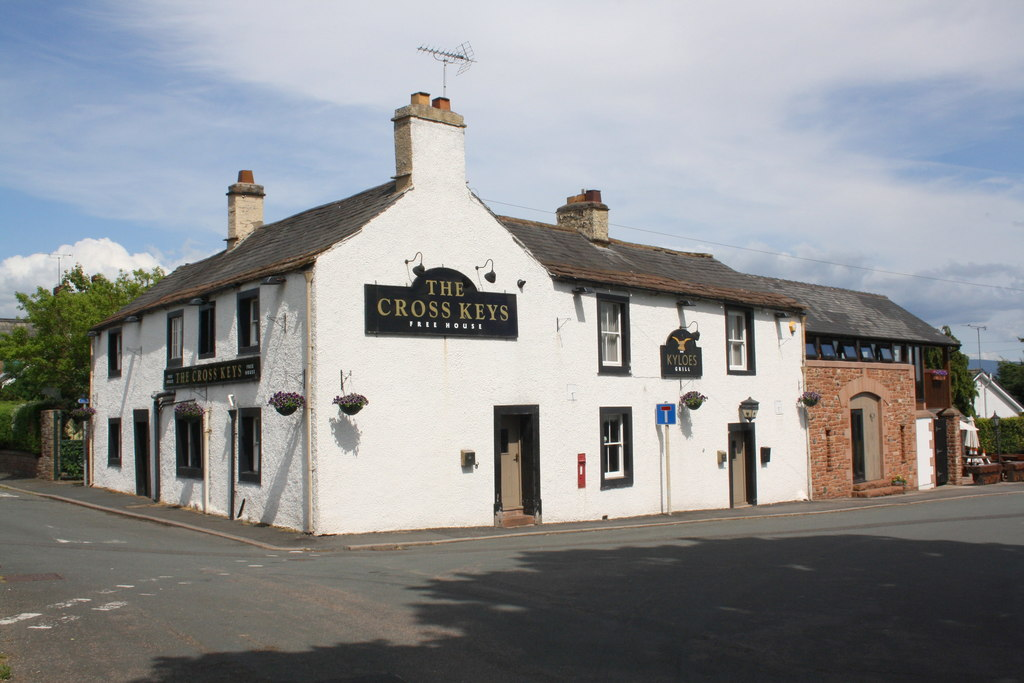
The Cross Keys Inn, Carleton

Before its severing by the A66 Penrith Bypass near the Countess Pillar, Carleton Road led, and still leads, down the hill to Brougham Castle. It was upgraded at the instigation of John Loudon McAdam, who lived locally in Cockell House at the end of Drovers Lane. In 1824, he submitted a plan to the council for a turnpike road, running from Drovers Lane to Appleby (and eastwards to Greta Bridge in Yorkshire) via Carleton and Frenchfield. A turnpike toll bar was set up near Brougham Castle, just north of Brougham Castle Bridge - the tollhouse is still there. The road then went over to where the Countess Pillar stands before going on to Temple Sowerby. Brougham Castle Bridge is listed as Grade II by Historic England who note a date on the central parapet of 1813. They describe it as "a broad County Council bridge on the Penrith-Appleby turnpike."

== Housing developments ==
The Penrith Neighbourhood Development Plan (Eden Local Plan, 2014-2032, adopted by Westmorland and Furness Council following a referendum in 2025), as well as plans drawn up by previous councils, allocated existing farmland around Penrith for new housing. Up to 1974, planning decisions were made by the Penrith Urban District Council; from 1974-2023 by Eden District Council. The following are the developments that occurred in the Carleton area approved by all three councils.

To the north-west of the A686 road (Carleton Avenue) and to the north of Carleton Road is the large High Carleton housing estate which was started in the 1960s. (Previous to this estate being built, the area was an old army camp which after World War II was inhabited by dispossessed Polish nationals as well as people on the housing waiting lists for the area). The estate is subdivided into the Frenchfield Way/Frenchfield Gardens area, the original High Carleton area, Carleton Park or Parklands, Carleton Meadows and Carleton Heights. Most of the streets in this area are named after trees, e.g.: Oak Road, Sycamore Drive, Juniper Way. A small stream runs through the estate (Carleton Beck). Oak Road connects Carleton with the neighbouring estates of Meadow Croft and Scaws. At the junction of Oak Road and Ash Road is a nursery school.

Since 2016 the land to the north of High Carleton has been developed by Persimmon Homes as the Carleton Meadows estate and by Persimmon/Charles Church as the Woodberry Heights estate (500 dwellings). It includes a community centre. The streets on this development are named after flowers.

To the east of Carleton Meadows and with access off Carleton Hill Road is the Carleton Manor Park development (44 dwellings). It was built (2015-2019) by the local Penrith firm Cumbrian Homes (now defunct), and is next to the grounds of Carleton Hill House. The estate includes an apartment block as well as detached and semi-detached houses.

Next to Winters Park and adjoining the Pategill Estate is Carleton Hall Gardens and Carleton Hall Walk. The Pategill Estate itself (350 dwellings) was first proposed in 1964 and the first (Urban District Council) tenants were established there in 1969.

Cumbrian developers Story Homes have built houses in the fields off Carleton Road behind the Cross Keys Inn and the cottages that make up Carleton Village (2020-24). This estate (149 dwellings) is named Brougham Fields.

Genesis Homes ( a Penrith-based developer) built 83 dwellings to the north-east of the Brougham Fields development in 2022-25. This estate is named Eamont Chase.

Barratt Homes Manchester, part of Barratt Redrow, built the Carleton Chase estate (105 dwellings) off Carleton Avenue (A686), on land formerly part of Carleton Hall Farm, in 2025/2026. The development raised concerns from the local town council regarding its non-agreed allocation of extra housing as well as the lack of infrastructure development (a feature of other housing developments across Penrith).

Tesco opened a Tesco Express outlet on Carleton Avenue (A686), just south of the Carleton Chase estate, in 2025.

== History ==
In 1964, a funerary inscription, inscribed on what was judged to be a Roman milestone, was found at Frenchfield Farm (now a private school), just east of Carleton. This is one of only three inscriptions, all found in the Penrith region, referring to the 'civitas Carvetiorum', or canton of the Carvetii, possibly a sub-tribe of the Brigantes confederation. The find also adds weight to the suggested line of a Roman road running from the fort at Brocavum passing close to Carleton on its way to the fort at Old Penrith (near Plumpton).

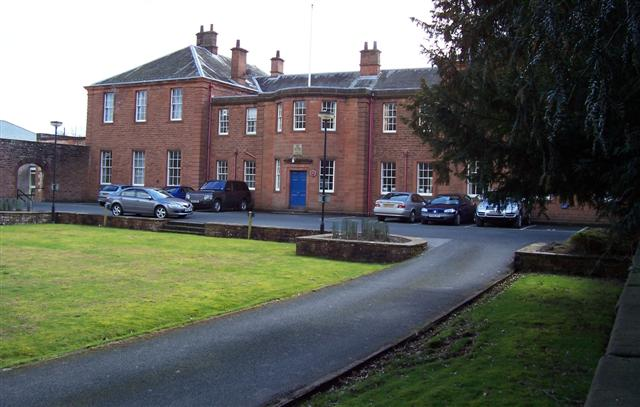
Carleton Hall – now Cumbria Police HQ

Carleton Hall (not to be confused with an older Carleton Hall at Drigg, West Cumbria) is the headquarters of the Cumbria Constabulary, but once was the home of the Carleton family who had purchased the property from the Earl of Burlington (who had received it in turn by marrying into the Clifford family).

The Hall's history includes a connection to the Atlantic slave trade. The last of the Carletons was Robert (1657-1703) who had married Joanna (or Joan) Frere. He was her third husband, and she brought with her 400 acres of a profitable sugar cane and potato plantation in Christ Church, Barbados. His will listed the land, buildings and "421 negroes, more or less". However, it is unclear how much the Carleton Hall estate may have benefitted from this controversial income during the marriage. Robert died in 1703 leaving no heir and, due to indebtedness, Carleton Hall passed to the Pattinson family in 1710, and, through marriage, to the Simpson family. The building, according to Pevsner, is eighteenth century (garden front) and nineteenth century and 1937 (entrance front). Historic England has it listed as Grade II* and as "early eighteenth century with late eighteenth century alteration restored 1859 and partly re-built 1937." Just who built the Hall is unclear. One of the Simpson daughters married James Wallace who became Attorney-General under King George III. His son sold the Hall to the Cowper family in 1828.

Meanwhile, Joanna's fourth husband (marriage in 1709, one year before the disposal of the Hall) was Robert Lowther who therefore acquired the Barbados plantation and who became the Governor of Barbados. The plantation subsequently passed to his son (by his second wife) James Lowther, 1st Earl of Lonsdale.

During the first half of the twentieth century it was the home of the Carleton-Cowper family. The northern part of Carleton Hall's grounds are now divided between the Pategill housing estate and the Penrith Rugby Club. The Club's large car park is a legacy of World War II, being originally constructed as concrete standing for tanks involved in the Canal Defence Light project.The manor of Carleton was held as a sub-manor of the larger manor or Honour of Penrith.

Toll Bar Cottage north of Brougham Castle Bridge

In years gone by Carleton was a prosperous hamlet, boasting Sir Thomas Carleton as a notable celebrity. The Cross Keys Inn was a stopping off point for travellers on both the Appleby road through to Stainmore (A66) and the A686 Alston road. Carleton at one stage had a Reading Room in the centre of the village, and records show that the community here had annual harvest festivals and church services (possibly held in the Reading Room) or a makeshift wooden chapel (location unidentified) served by the Parish Church of St. Andrew, Penrith.

In 1766, the murder of one Thomas Parker took place near Cowrake Quarry. Already drunk, he had called in at the Cross Keys Inn for more drink and refused help from the staff to get him home. His body was found later near the quarry and his supposed godson, who had also called in at the pub looking for him, was tried and hanged for the murder. The murderer's body was hung in chains at what is marked on OS maps as Gibbet Hill, at the eastern end of Beacon Hill. Wordsworth recalled seeing the remains when a young boy and later wrote about it in Book XI of The Prelude.

In more recent times, prior to the development of High Carleton, the well-known Penrith greengrocery shop, Kerrs, used the land lying in present-day Frenchfield Way as its greenhouse produce fields. In those days the red sandstone walls on either side of Carleton Road leading uphill to the present day Oak Road junction were higher.

== Amenities ==
At Frenchfield, just south of Carleton Village towards Brougham Castle, are the Hunter Hall private preparatory school, Westmorland and Furness Council-owned sports pitches and the stadium for Penrith A.F.C.

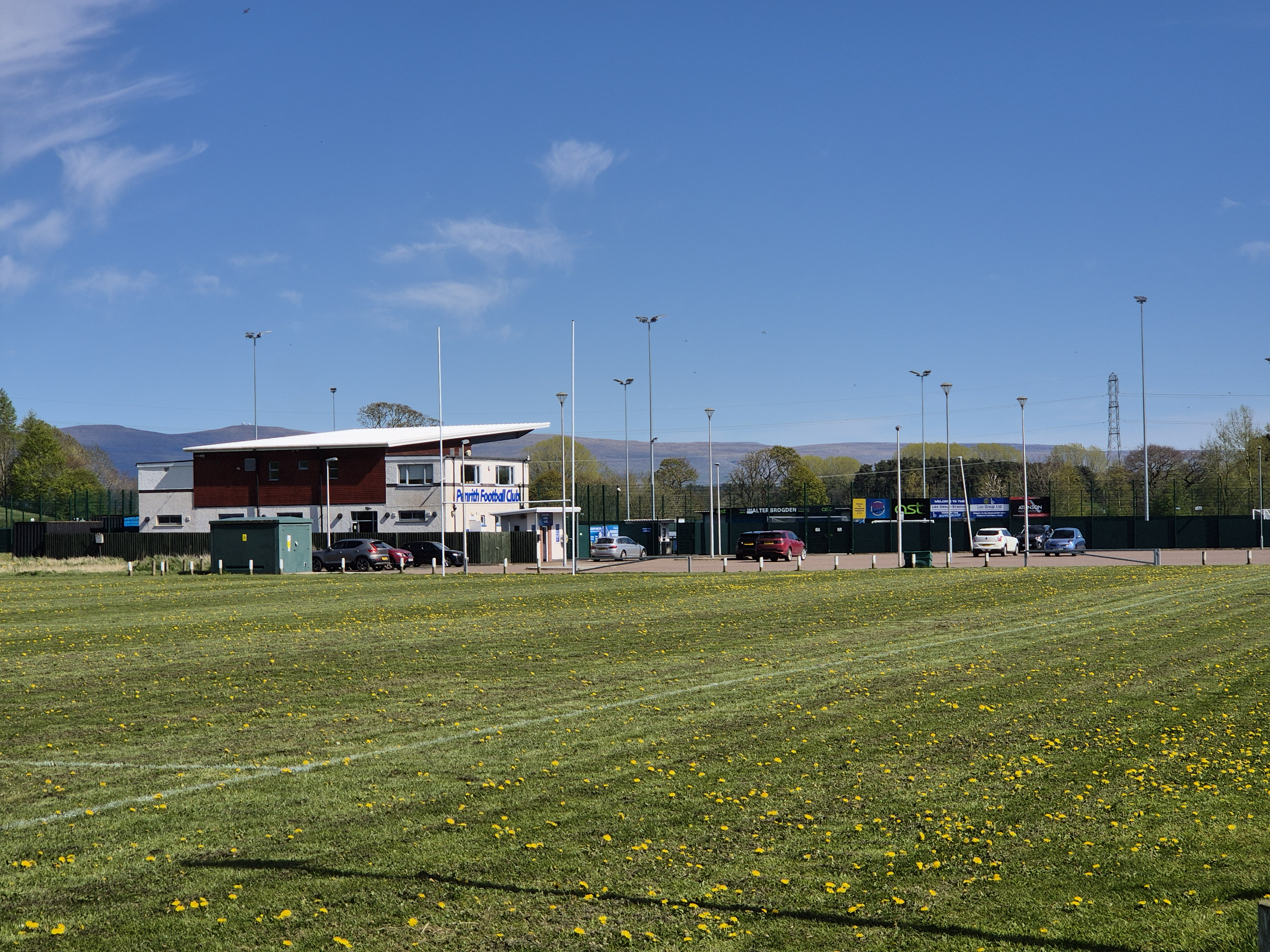
Penrith A.F.C., Frenchfield Park Stadium. Sports Centre playing fields in the foreground, North Pennines in the background

To the south-west of Carleton Road is Winters Park where Penrith Rugby Union Football Club has its ground.

The veterinary surgery, formerly located at the junction of Carleton Hill Road and the A686, moved to Clydesdale House, Carleton Hill Road, in 2026.

A children's play area is situated at Beckside on High Carleton.

== Local Government ==
Carleton lies within the Penrith South ward of Westmorland and Furness Council and in the Penrith Carleton ward of Penrith Town Council.

The whole suburb was formerly part of the Cumbria County Council division of Penrith East, before re-organisation in 2023.

Historically, Carleton has been one of the constablewicks or wards of the ancient parish of Penrith.

== Transport ==
Carleton Village is on the A686 road and is close to the Kemplay Bank roundabout where the A686 meets the A66 and the A6.

Carleton Road, which was formerly the A66 and was briefly numbered as a spur of the A686, is the main link road to the centre of Penrith.

The Penrith Town Service (bus route 646) serves both the High Carleton and the Carleton Hall areas hourly from Monday to Saturday from morning to mid afternoon.

The nearest railway station is Penrith North Lakes, over a mile away.

== Notable people ==
- James Wallace (British politician). Barrister, MP, Solicitor General and Attorney General. Inherited Carleton Hall through marriage to the Simpson family in 1767.
- Thomas Wallace, 1st Baron Wallace. Son of James. Barrister, MP, Solicitor General and Attorney General. Inherited Carleton Hall from his father in 1783; sold it to John Cowper in 1828.
- The 19th-century novelist, Frances Milton Trollope, mother of Anthony Trollope, lived briefly in a house called Carleton Hill just outside the village. She had the house built in 1840, but found the local climate too cold and sold the residence in 1843.
- Sir Stuart Donaldson, the first Premier of the Colony of New South Wales, died at Carleton Hall in January 1867.
