= Listed buildings in Brougham, Cumbria =

Brougham is a civil parish in Westmorland and Furness, Cumbria, England. It contains 18 buildings that are recorded in the National Heritage List for England. Of these, one is listed at Grade I, the highest of the three grades, six are at Grade II*, the middle grade, and the others are at Grade II, the lowest grade. The parish is to the southeast of the town of Penrith, and is almost completely rural. Two people are largely responsible for the more important buildings in the parish, Lady Anne Clifford in the 17th century, and Lord Brougham in the 19th century. The listed buildings include parts of a castle, later converted into a country house, a church, a chapel and its churchyard walls, a memorial pillar with an alms table, a house, farmhouses and farm buildings, two bridges, a milestone, and a parish boundary stone.

== Key ==
Grade	Criteria
I	Buildings of exceptional interest, sometimes considered to be internationally important
II*	Particularly important buildings of more than special interest
II	Buildings of national importance and special interest

== Buildings ==
Name and location	Photograph	Date	Notes	Grade
Curtain walls, gateway and other buildings, Brougham Hall; 54.64822°N 2.73263°W		Late 15th or early 16th century	The curtain walls and other buildings were extended in the 17th century, and restored and altered in the 19th century by L. N. Cottingham for Lord Brougham. The buildings are in sandstone, the curtains walls are almost complete and a battlemented. The other buildings include a gateway with a tower, a guardhouse, a two-storey three-bay range, and the ruins of stables and a domestic range.	II*
Hornby Hall and barns 54.66258°N 2.66932°W	—	Early or mid 16th century	A farmhouse and barns in sandstone with green slate roofs. The house has two storeys with a five-bay hall, a two-bay extension to the left and a four-bay extension to the rear. On the front is a three-storey porch with a Tudor arched doorway, above which is a coat of arms and two windows with hood moulds. Most of the windows in the main part are mullioned; elsewhere some have Tudor arched heads, others are sashes or casements. The three-bay barn to the right dates from the 18th century, and contains segmental-arched entrances, external steps leading to a loft door, and ventilation slits.	II*
Hospital Farmhouse; 54.64717°N 2.72350°W	—	Late 16th or early 17th century	The farmhouse is roughcast on a cement plinth with a green slate roof. It has two storeys, a central section of three bays, a projecting bay to the left, and a projecting gabled one-bay wing to the right. On the front is a sandstone gabled porch with a Tudor arched doorway, above which is a coat of arms. Most of the windows are mullioned with hood moulds.	II
Winderwath House; 54.65783°N 2.62449°W	—	Mid 17th century	The house contains some medieval features, and was extensively extended in the 19th and 20th centuries. It is stuccoed with sandstone dressings, and has a green slate roof. The 19th-century part has two storeys and five bays; the older part is at right angles to the rear and is lower with two storeys and three bays. The 19th-century part has a Tudor arched doorway, a two-story canted bay window to the left, and a gabled wing to the right. The windows are mullioned and transomed with hood moulds. The older part has a moulded doorcase with pilasters, and a frieze and cornice on consoles. The windows are mullioned, and there is another two storey bay-window.	II
Countess Pillar; 54.65366°N 2.70492°W		1656	A monument erected by Lady Anne Clifford to the memory of her mother, Margaret Clifford, and restored in 1986. It consists of an octagonal sandstone column on a chamfered base. The column carries a cuboid block with a truncated pyramidal roof and a finial. Three of the sides of the block have sundials with painted faces and gnomons, one also carrying an inscription, and the other face has a coat of arms. The monument stands on a flagged base and is surrounded by railings, and is also a Scheduled Monument.	II*
Alms table 54.65367°N 2.70488°W	—	1656	The alms table is beside the Countess Pillar. It consists of two square flat slabs on top of each other, the upper slab having a chamfered lower edge, and on the top are lead-filled holes. The table is used for the annual distribution of alms.	II*
St Wilfrid's chapel 54.64849°N 2.73353°W		1658	This was the chapel to Brougham Hall, rebuilt by Lady Anne Clifford on a medieval site. It was altered in about 1843–46 by L. N. Cottingham for Lord Brougham, including the insertion of a rose window at the east end. The chapel is in sandstone with quoins, and has a green slate roof with coped gables. The chapel consists of a nave and a chancel under a common roof, with an open twin bellcote on the west gable. The south doorway and the windows have pointed heads, and between the windows are stepped buttresses.	II*
St Ninian's Church; 54.66281°N 2.68466°W		1659–60	The church was built by Lady Anne Clifford on the site of a medieval church, and the porch was added in 1841. The church is in sandstone with a green slate roof, and consists of a nave and chancel under one roof, and a south porch; on the west gable is a bellcote. The windows are round-headed in chamfered surrounds, and between them are buttresses. The porch has a Tudor arched doorway with a date panel above it. The internal furnishings date mainly from the time the church was built. The church is now redundant and is under the care of the Churches Conservation Trust.	I
Farmhouse and barn, Julian Bower Farm; 54.63039°N 2.61658°W	—	18th century	The farmhouse and barn are in sandstone, the farmhouse with a roof of Welsh slate, and the barn with a roof of stone slabs. The farmhouse has two storeys and three bays, and an outshut, quoins, and mullioned windows. The barn has two storeys, consisting of a byre and a hayloft above, with a rear outshut. There are various openings, including mullioned windows, and on the left return are external steps.	II
Moorhouse Farmhouse; 54.64547°N 2.70454°W	—	Late 18th century	A roughcast farmhouse with sandstone quoins, an eaves cornice, and a green slate roof with coped gables. There are two storeys with attics, and three bays. The central doorway has an alternate block surround, a keyed lintel, and a pediment. The windows are sashes in sandstone surrounds, those in the ground floor having false keys.	II
Fremington; 54.64835°N 2.70877°W	—	Late 18th or early 19th century	A sandstone house with quoins and a green slate roof. It has two storeys and an L-shaped plan, consisting of a left wing with three bays, and a right wing with two bays. In the right wing is a doorway with pilasters, a pediment and a fanlight. To the right is a two-storey canted bay window, and the other windows are sashes.	II
Brougham Castle Bridge; 54.65482°N 2.71701°W		1813	The bridge was built for Penrith to Appleby turnpike, and carries a road over the River Eamont. It is in Penrith sandstone, and consist of three segmental arches. The bridge has rounded cutwaters, recessed voussoirs, and a solid chamfered parapet.	II
Low Woodside; 54.65414°N 2.63911°W	—	Early 19th century	A farmhouse and estate office in sandstone with quoins, and a green slate roof with coped gables. There are two storeys and three bays. The central round-headed doorway has a fanlight, the windows are sashes, and all have plain stone surrounds.	II
Bridge between Brougham Hall and St Wilfrid's Chapel; 54.64824°N 2.73342°W		Early 19th century	The bridge crosses above a road and links the hall with the chapel. It is in sandstone, and consists of a single segmental arch. The bridge has recessed voussoirs, and a solid modillioned shaped parapet.	II
Churchyard wall, St Wilfrid's Chapel; 54.64833°N 2.73316°W	—	Early 19th century	The wall was built for Lord Brougham to surround the churchyard, and is in sandstone. Between the chapel and the hall, it is high, and contains a pointed arch; on the other three sides it is much lower.	II
Milestone; 54.65316°N 2.67518°W	—	Early 19th century	The milestone is in cast iron supported by sandstone, and has a triangular plan. There are plates on two sides, respectively inscribed with the distances in miles to Appleby and to Penrith.	II
Brougham Hall; 54.64804°N 2.73309°W		1830–47	A country house built on the site of a 14th-century tower house that was designed by L. N. Cottingham for Lord Brougham. It was partly demolished in 1935, and is now largely in ruins, but was partly restored in 1985 to be used for various purposes. It is built in sandstone in a U-shaped plan on three sides of a courtyard. What does remain includes cellars, part of a billiard room, and part of a carriage archway.	II*
Parish boundary stone 54.63802°N 2.70905°W	—	1847	The stone marks the boundary between the parishes of Brougham and Clifton. It is in cast iron supported by sandstone, and has a triangular plan with a plate on each side containing the names of the parishes. One plate also has the date, and this is repeated on the top.	II
