= Ninekirks =

Church in Cumbria, England

Coordinates: 54.662807°N 2.684721°W

St Ninian's church
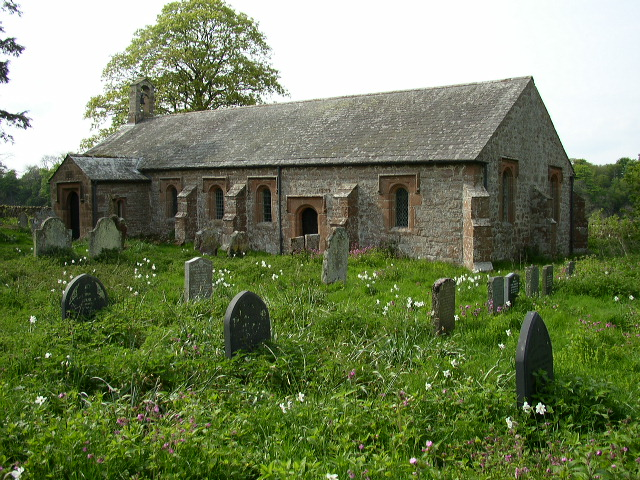
- St Ninian's church

- Location in Cumbria
- OS grid reference: NY 5593029962
- Location: St Ninian's church Cumbria
- Country: England
- Denomination: Anglican
- Website: https://www.visitchurches.org.uk/visit/church-listing/st-ninians-brougham.html

History
- Dedication: St Ninian

Architecture
- Functional status: closed
- Closed: 1934

Ninekirks is the local name for St Ninian's church, Brougham, Cumbria. Dedicated to Saint Ninian, it was formerly the Anglican parish church for Brougham, a parish which is now combined with Clifton, a neighbouring village. It is preserved as a redundant church for its architectural interest, and presents a mainly seventeenth-century appearance. It has been known as Ninekirks since at least 1583.

== Importance ==
The building is Grade I listed. It is one of very few churches to be built during the Commonwealth of England and has been altered very little. (Three other churches of this age are: Church of the Holy Trinity, Berwick-on-Tweed; St Matthias Old Church, London Borough of Tower Hamlets; and Staunton Harold, Leicestershire.)

== History ==
The Romans built a fort at Brougham called Brocavum, situated near the confluence of the River Eamont and the River Eden. The Ninekirks site has been continuously occupied since at least Roman times. Roman occupation of the site is demonstrated by the Ninekirks Hoard of barbarous radiate coins. As a Christian site, the area was associated with St.Ninian from a very early date but "not everyone is convinced entirely by the arguments of Canon Bouch and others for Ninian". There are caves nearby on the north bank of the Eamont at a site called Isis Parlis and possible evidence of occupation of these is used to support arguments in favour of early hermit use.

The centre of population moved near Brougham Hall sometime between 1230 and 1284. The Hall had a chapel from the 14th century, and the church fell into disuse. In 1659 the church was reconstructed by Lady Anne Clifford, the then owner of Brougham Castle, the work being completed the following year.

Ninekirks tended to be used when the chapel at Brougham Hall was unavailable. For example, from 1764 until the 1840s Ninekirks was used for weddings because Brougham Chapel was in need of repair work. Ninekirks was itself repaired in the 1840s. The porch was added in 1841 and tombs within the church were excavated in 1846 when the church was being repaired. According to Brougham (1847) these included those of Udard (or Odard) de Broham (died c.1185) and Gilbert de Broham (died c.1230). Despite the repair work, the church was poorly maintained when George Shaw visited in 1847.

The church had a brief golden age in the early 1950s when the Rector was Canon Bouch. His publications in the Transactions of the Cumberland and Westmorland Antiquarian and Archaeological Society (in 1947, 1950 and 1955 (twice)) demonstrate his interest. It was made redundant in 1977 and is now in the care of the Churches Conservation Trust.

=== Hatchments ===
The church contains three hatchments:

- Elizabeth Richmond (died 1729) and Peter Brougham (died 1732)
- Eleanora Syme (died 1839) who married Henry Brougham (died 1810), father of the 1st Baron
- Henry Brougham, 1st Baron Brougham and Vaux (died 1868) and Mary Anne Eden (died 1865)

== Archaeology ==
The church and its area have been the subject of at least four archaeological investigations:

- Excavations took place inside the church during the repairs in the 1840s (Brougham, 1847) when some ancient tombs were investigated.
- Excavations at Isis Parlis in 1913 aiming to find out how the caves had formed and how they had been used.
- The coin hoard was discovered in 1914
- Crop marks were observed in a 1968 aerial photograph consistent with a small monastic site.

== See also ==
- Brougham Castle
- Grade I listed churches in Cumbria
- Grade I listed buildings in Cumbria
- Listed buildings in Brougham, Cumbria
- List of churches preserved by the Churches Conservation Trust in Northern England
