= Whinfell Forest =

Forest in Brougham, Cumbria, England, UK

Coordinates: 54.6397°N 2.6595°W

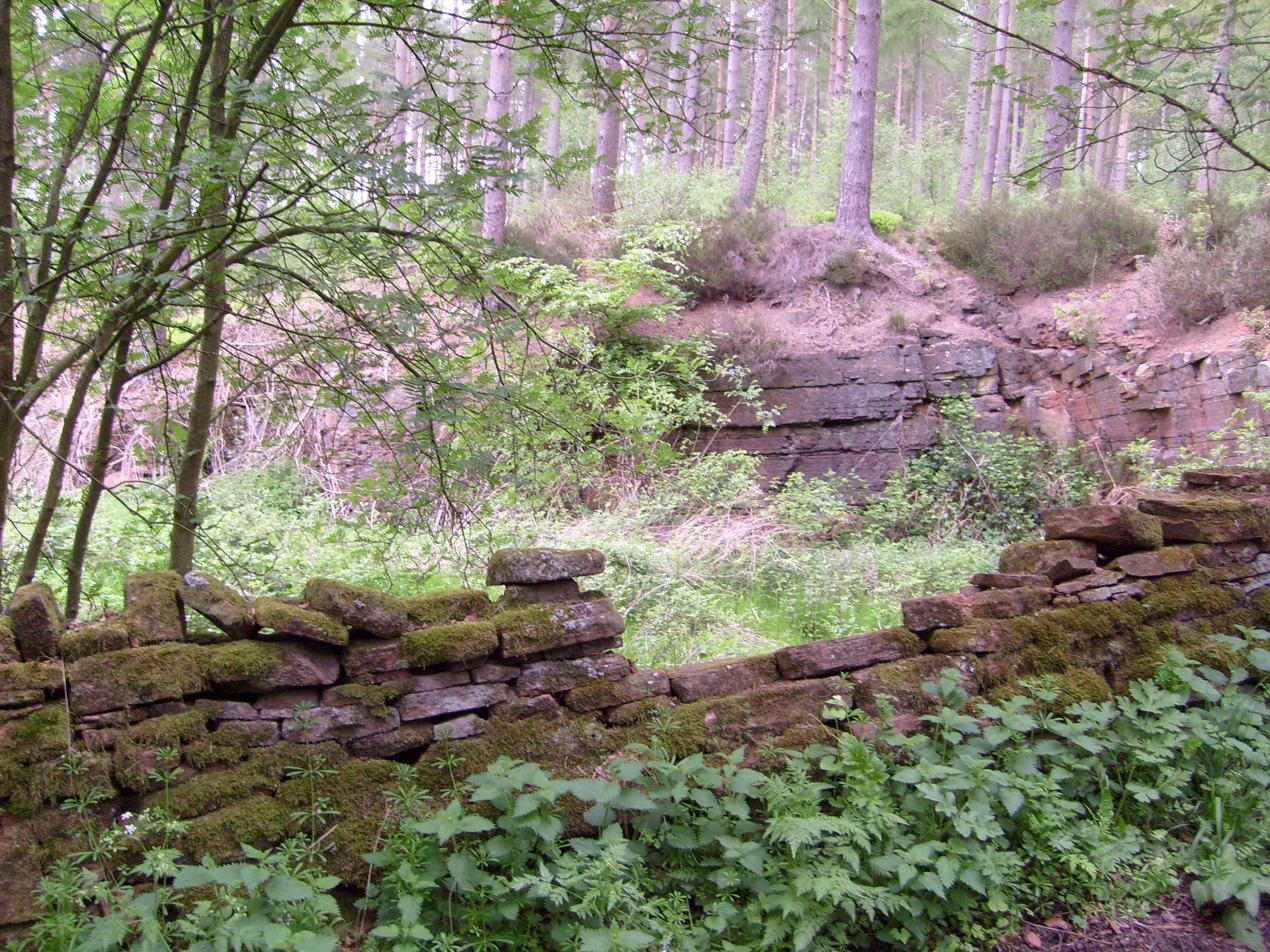
18th-century quarry and drystone wall in Whinfell Forest

Whinfell Forest is a small area of woodland in the parish of Brougham, Cumbria, south east of Penrith in Cumbria and just off the A66 road leading to Appleby-in-Westmorland. The forest is a short distance from the Lake District national park and is surrounded by a large number of woodlands west of the Pennines. It is notable today for the presence of Center Parcs and a red squirrel reserve. It was notable historically for its associations with Lady Anne Clifford, Brougham Castle and Inglewood Forest.

== History ==
Whinfell Forest has existed since at least 1203 when it "formed part of King John's grant of the Barony of Westmorland to Robert de Veteripont". In 1283 it was divided between Isabella and Idonea, daughters of Robert II de Vieuxpont. It is frequently mentioned in the diaries of Lady Anne Clifford (1590–1676) as she travelled in the area visiting Brougham Castle and Appleby-in-Westmorland.

Whinfell Park was at the core of the forest. Its proximity to Inglewood Forest meant that it was mentioned in court documents relating to disputes between the two areas. The park contained two frequently mentioned landmark trees: the Harthorn Tree and the Three Brother Tree. The Harthorn Tree had a hart's horn embedded in it. The Three Brother Tree was the sole survivor of three unusually large oaks called the Three Brethren. The site of the Harthorn Tree is marked on old maps. The name "Three Oaks" is used within the Center Parcs site. By 1779, the park had been divided into farms by enclosure.

Today, the forest forms part of the Lowther estates. A large part of it is designated by Natural England as Ancient Replanted Woodland.

== Holiday village ==
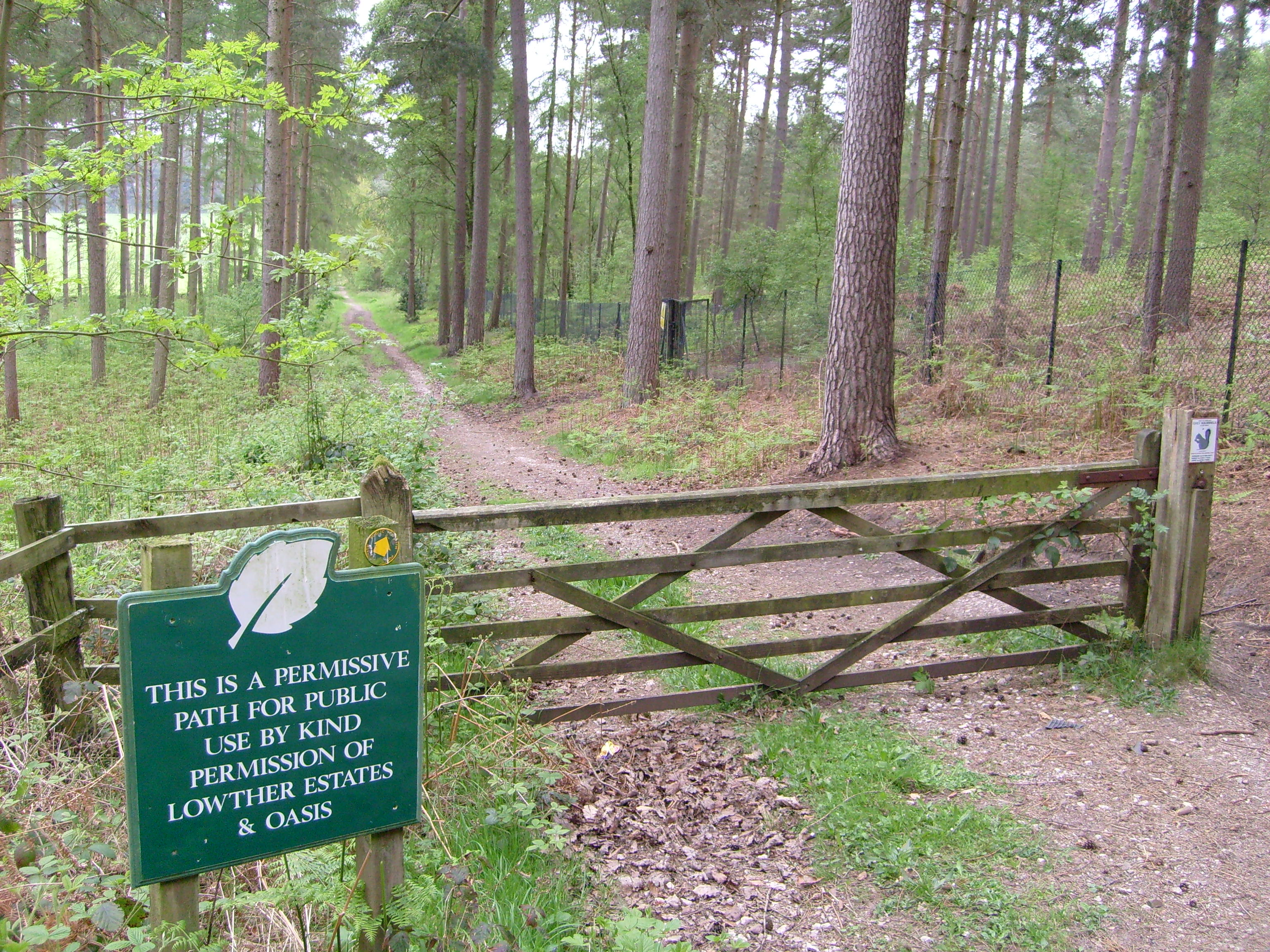
Footpath along outer edge of Center Parcs boundary fence

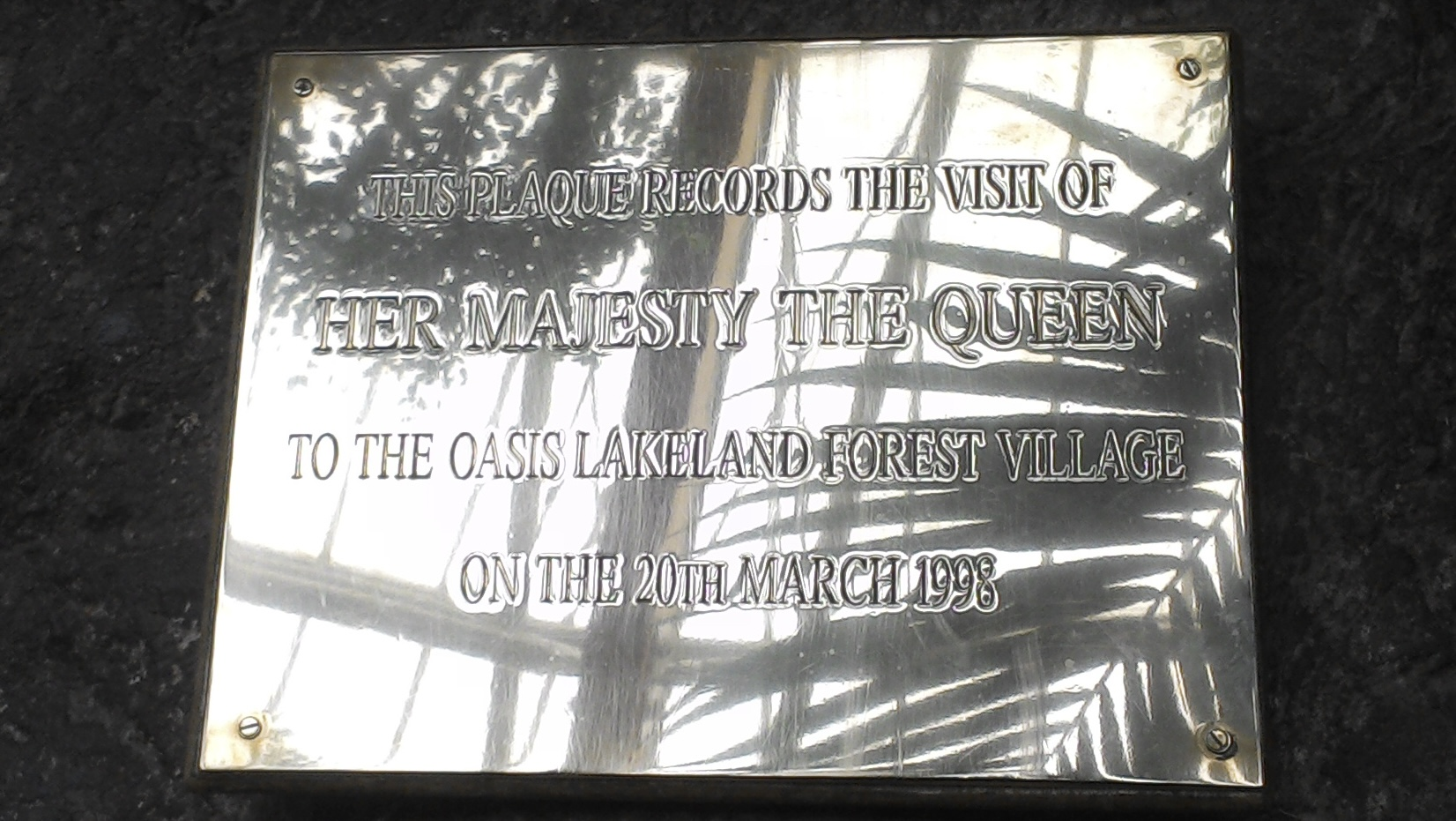
Recording the 1998 visit of Elizabeth II to the Oasis Lakeland Forest Village

In 1993 a leisure resort was planned for the site under the proposed name "Lakewoods Holiday Village". The Rank Group constructed this as "Oasis Lakeland Holiday Village" which featured commercial restaurants and businesses such as Burger King and a Hard Rock Cafe. It was sold to Center Parcs in 2001 who removed the commercial ventures and now operate it as "Center Parcs Whinfell Forest".

Whinfell Forest is the largest of Center Parcs' five UK holiday villages, with accommodation for 4,668 people in 861 units.

== Transport ==
Stagecoach Cumbria operates the 104 route out of the holiday park to Penrith and Carlisle.

== See also ==
- List of ancient woods in England
