= Countess of Cumberland =

Countess of Cumberland may refer to:

- Eleanor Clifford, Countess of Cumberland (1519-1547)
- Margaret Clifford, Countess of Cumberland (1560–1616)
