= Margaret Clifford =

Margaret Clifford may refer to:

- Margaret Stanley, Countess of Derby (1540–1596), daughter of Henry Clifford, 2nd Earl of Cumberland
- Margaret Clifford, Countess of Cumberland (1560–1616), English noblewoman and maid of honor to Elizabeth I
