= Countess Pillar =

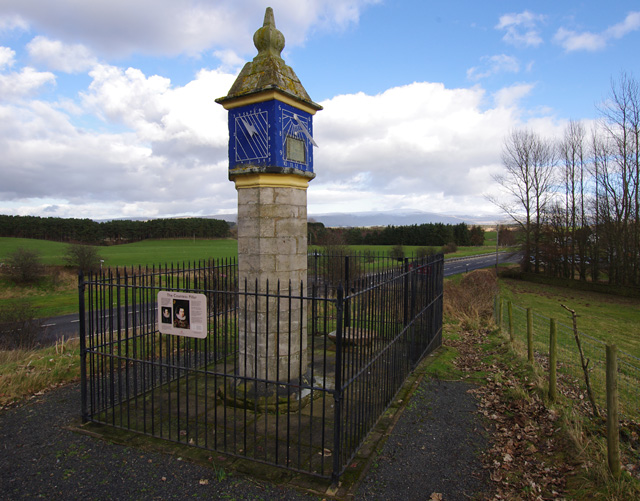
- Countess Pillar, Brougham
- Interactive map of Countess Pillar
- Location: Brougham
- Coordinates: 54°39′13″N 2°42′18″W
- Type: Column
- Material: Stone
- Completion date: 1656
- Dedicated to: Margaret Clifford, Countess of Cumberland

The Countess Pillar is a 17th-century monument near Brougham, Cumbria, England, between Penrith and Appleby. It is two miles east of Penrith on the A66 but is not accessible to the public from 2026 to 2030.

The square top of the pillar is brightly painted and carries sundials on its sides. It was erected by Lady Anne Clifford in 1656 to mark the place where she said goodbye for the last time to her mother, Margaret Clifford, Countess of Cumberland.

Anne Clifford, countess of Pembroke, Dorset and Montgomery (1590–1676), spent much of her life in a long and complex legal battle to obtain the rights of her inheritance. Her mother was one of the few people who supported Anne's claim to the family estates. In 1616 Anne travelled north to see "her" estates and visit her mother at Brougham Castle. On her departure from the castle, Anne travelled with her mother a quarter of a mile to where the castle drive meets the main road, where they had "a grievous and heavy parting". Margaret died a month later.

The inscription on the pillar describes Anne as "Sole Heire" of her father, George Earl of Cumberland. It also refers to a bequest in memory of Margaret which was made to the poor of the parish of Brougham. This is commemorated annually on 2 April.

== In literature ==
Felicia Hemans's poem "The Memorial Pillar", on the circumstances surrounding the erection of this monument, forms a part of her Records of Woman.

== See also ==
- Grade II* listed buildings in Westmorland and Furness
- Listed buildings in Brougham, Cumbria
