= Jan van Belcamp =

Flemish painter

- Born: 1610; Antwerp
- Died: 1653; London

Jan van Belcamp (1610–1653) was a Flemish painter and copyist, active in England.

== Life ==
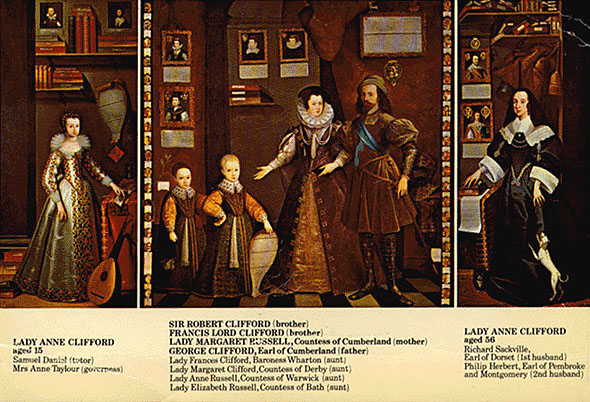
The so-called Great Picture, a triptych portrait of Lady Anne Clifford, attributed to van Belcamp. Now at the Abbot Hall Art Gallery.

He was born in Antwerp but spent most of his career in England, where he was employed making copies of pictures in the Royal Collection. According to his contemporary, Richard Symonds "this Belcamp was an under copier to another Dutchman, that did fondly keep the king's pictures and whenever any nobleman desired a copy, he directed them to Belcamp." He also supplied the figures, probably copied from larger portraits, for A View of Greenwich (c.1632), painted by Adriaan van Stalbemt for Charles I and still in the Royal Collection.

His paintings of Henry VII and Henry VIII, copied from a large picture by Holbein, later destroyed in a fire at Whitehall, were once at Drayton House in Northamptonshire. There was also a collection of portraits copied by Belcamp at Wimpole Hall in Cambridgeshire.

The "Great Picture" (1648; now in Abbot Hall Art Gallery in Kendal), a triptych showing the family of Lady Anne Clifford, which was formerly in Appleby Castle, has been attributed to van Belcamp. Many of the individuals shown were portrayed posthumously, using earlier portraits for reference.

In 1649, following the execution of Charles I, Belcamp was appointed to the commission set up to sell the king's goods. Belcamp presumably contributed valuations of the pictures. Belcamp died in London; Richard Symonds noted that he was recently dead in 1653.

== Sources ==
- Belkamp, Jan van at the Netherlands Institute for Art History.
