= Brougham, Cumbria =

Village and civil parish in Cumbria, England

Coordinates: 54.644500°N 2.724763°W

Brougham
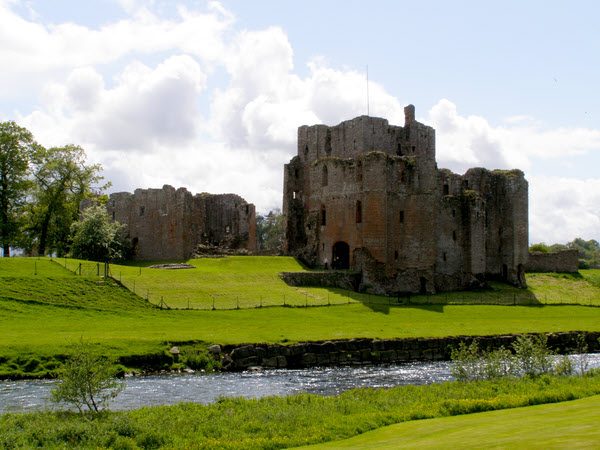
- Brougham Castle from the north east

- Location within Cumbria
- Population: 277 (2011)
- OS grid reference: NY794145
- Civil parish: Brougham
- Unitary authority: Westmorland and Furness
- Ceremonial county: Cumbria
- Region: North West
- Country: England
- Sovereign state: United Kingdom
- Post town: PENRITH
- Postcode district: CA10
- Dialling code: 01768
- Police: Cumbria
- Fire: Cumbria
- Ambulance: North West
- UK Parliament: Westmorland and Lonsdale

Brougham /ˈbruːm/ is a small village (or more properly a collection of hamlets) and civil parish on the outskirts of Penrith in the Westmorland and Furness unitary authority area in Cumbria, England. According to the 2001 census the parish had a population of 279, falling marginally to 277 at the 2011 Census.

Within the parish are the remains of Brocavum Roman fort. The ruins of the medieval Brougham Castle, once home to Lady Anne Clifford, are next to the fort. The mainly 19th century Brougham Hall, the former seat of the Lords Brougham and Vaux is nearby. The 17th-century Countess Pillar, set up by Lady Anne, is beside the A66 near the castle.

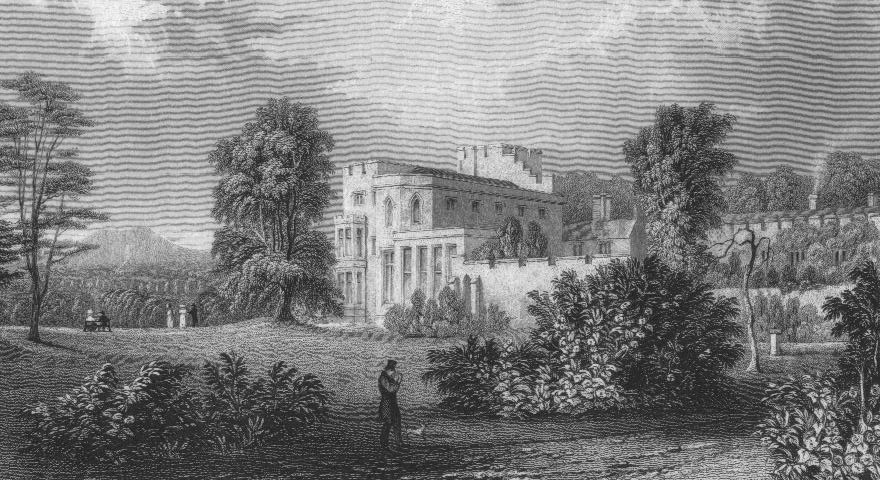
Brougham Hall in 1832.

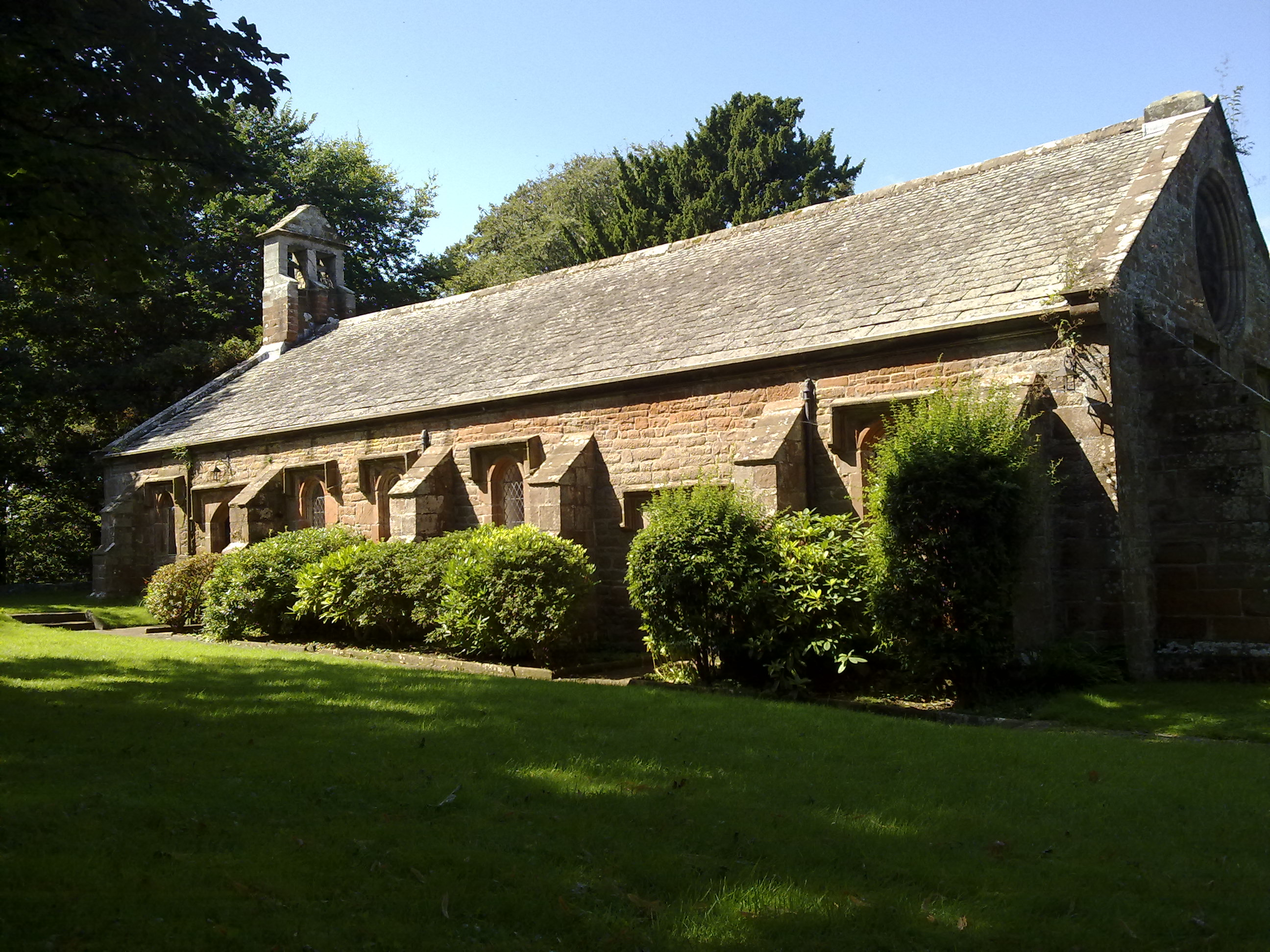
St Wilfrid Church

The parish has two Anglican churches:

- The historic Ninekirks, dedicated to St Ninian, is situated by the banks of the River Eamont and was extensively rebuilt by Lady Anne Clifford. It was previously a Norman foundation, probably on the site of an earlier Anglo-Saxon church. There is reputed to have been an even more ancient monastery nearby, founded by St Ninian (see also History of Cumbria).
- St Wilfred's or Brougham Chapel is next to the hall, overlooking the River Lowther.

Brougham "village" itself is no more than a scattering of farms and modern housing near the hall and is, along with neighbouring Eamont Bridge, often classed as an outlying suburb of Penrith. There are some more cottages next to the castle, which is partially built on the site of the Roman fort.

Within the parish is Whinfell Forest the site of a Red squirrel reserve, a Center Parcs holiday village, and the site of RAF Hornby Hall World War II aerodrome.

== See also ==
- Listed buildings in Brougham, Cumbria
