= Brougham Hall =

Country house in Cumbria, England

Coordinates: 54.6480°N 2.7329°W

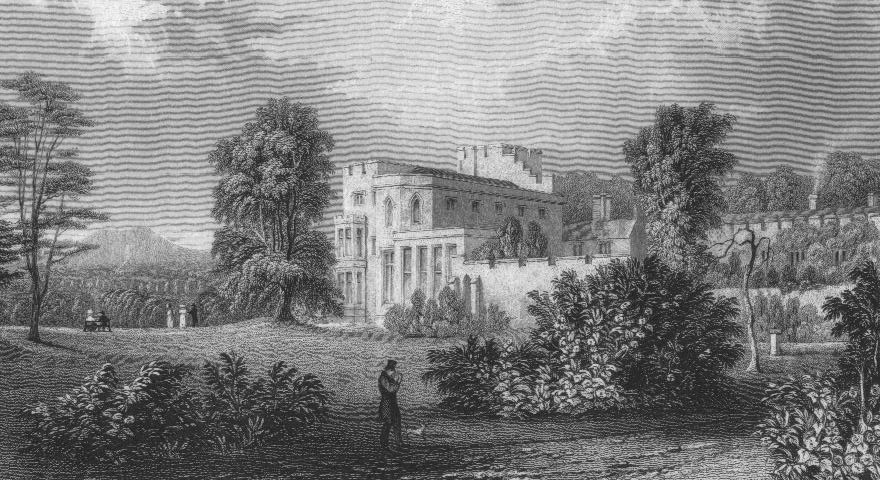
Brougham Hall in 1832

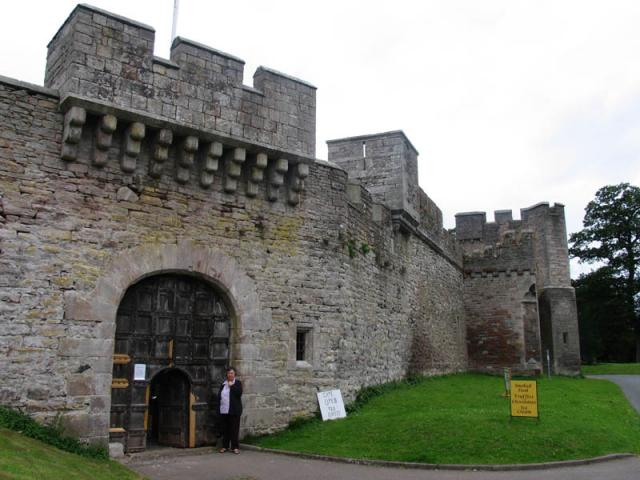
Brougham Hall

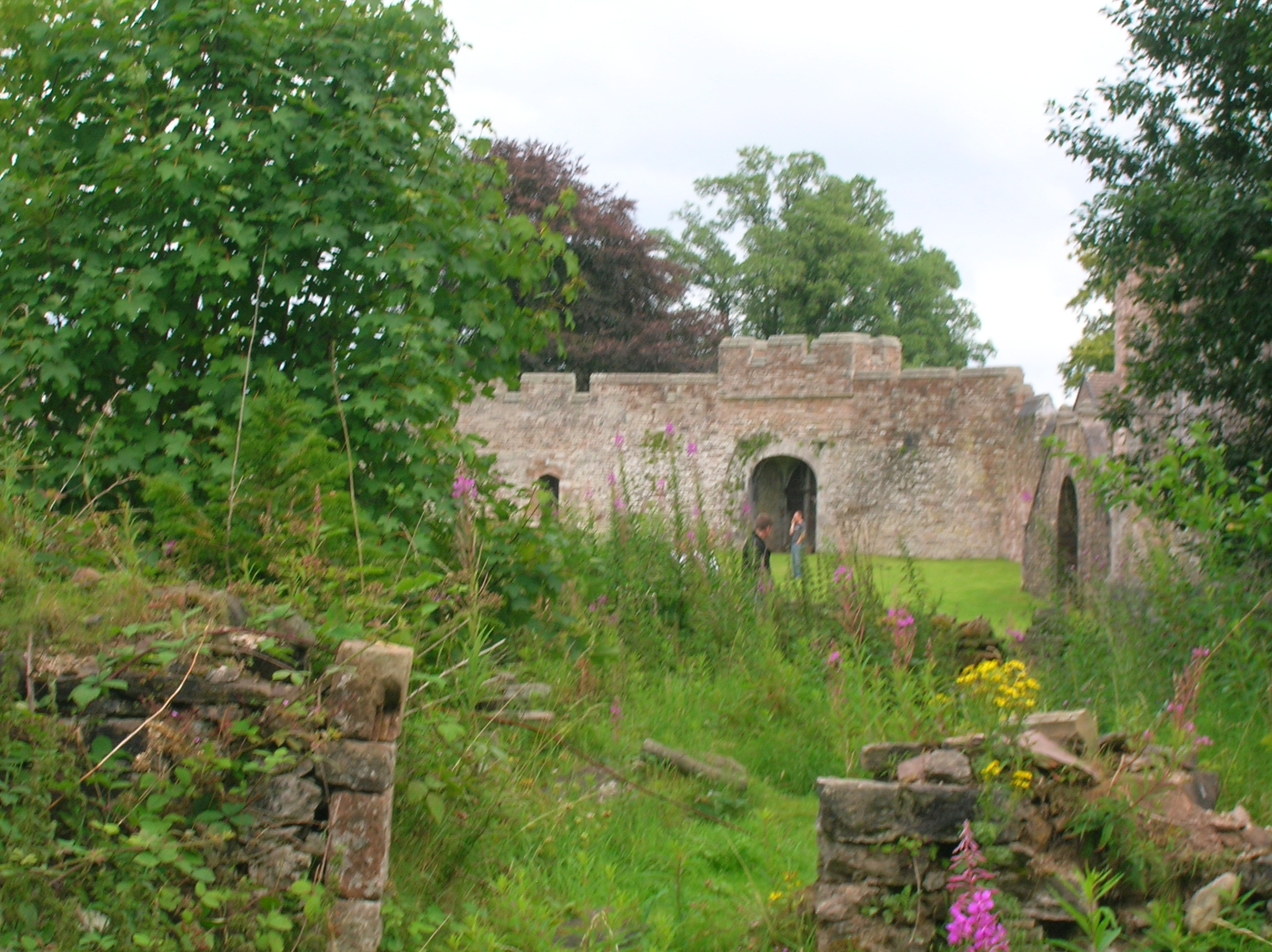
The courtyard from the terrace, 2008

Brougham Hall is a historic house museum located in the village of Brougham just outside Penrith, Cumbria, England.

== History ==
The de Burgham family may have held land at Brougham in Edward the Confessor's time and were allowed to keep their position after the Norman Conquest of England, which occurred after 1092 in this region : a Wilfred de Burgham was recorded in the reign of Henry II. The de Burghams retained land by military service to the Vieuxpont lords who lived at Brougham Castle close by.

The hall, usually sold in third parts, passed through the hands of various families in medieval times. Lady Anne Clifford, 14th Baroness de Clifford, the then owner of Brougham Castle, bought one third part of Brougham Hall in 1654. Amongst other improvements, she re-built the Hall's chapel, St. Wilfrid's, completed about 1659. Lady Anne's attorney-at law and later her steward, James Bird, bought her third of the Hall and manor after her death (1676), being the first person to hold the entirety of the building since the de Broughams. The male line of the Birds of Brougham family died out, however, and the then owner of the Hall and estate, Thomas Carleton, sold both to John Brougham of Scales in 1726. John Brougham belonged to a separate branch of the old de Brougham family, and was "the most successful member of the Brougham family in the 18th century", being a Commissioner in the Excise service for England as well as a barrister and local squire.

The oldest part of the hall is the thirteenth-century gateway, followed by the Tudor Hall, which dates back to around 1480–1520. The seventeenth-century guardhouse was built by James Bird. The Hall was close to the scene of a bloody battle between the Jacobite army of Prince Charles Edward Stuart and Government forces (the Clifton Moor Skirmish), that took place in December 1745.

The rise to power of Henry Brougham, 1st Baron Brougham and Vaux, led to the Hall being extended and enlarged between 1830 and 1847, to designs by the architect Lewis Nockalls Cottingham. The building works were largely overseen by Henry's brother, William Brougham, 2nd Baron Brougham and Vaux.

From this point on, Brougham Hall received visits from London " society" and other notable people, including royalty. This culminated in the visit, in 1905, of the King, Edward VII. However, after World War I, Brougham Hall, in common with many other country houses, faced a severe financial crisis. This was compounded by the spendthrift nature of Victor Brougham, 4th Baron Brougham and Vaux, and his failed attempts to shore up income by becoming a professional gambler. The hall was sold by Victor, 4th Baron Brougham, attempting to pay his many debts, in 1934, and was thereafter sold again for demolition.

From 1941 to 1945, there was a secret tank development facility at Brougham Hall. The project was known as Canal Defence Light (CDL). A plaque at the Hall remembers the men who worked there during the war. There is also a bunker which was used during World War II.

After World War II, the Hall languished in a derelict state until it was purchased by Christopher Terry in 1967. Mr. Terry and his wife, Alison, determined to arrest the further decline of the Hall.

Today, the hall is the subject of a renovation project by volunteers and is open to visitors throughout the year.

== See also ==
- Grade II* listed buildings in Westmorland and Furness
- Listed buildings in Brougham, Cumbria
- Brougham Castle – a nearby ruined castle
