= Brocavum =

Coordinates: 54.6540°N 2.7191°W

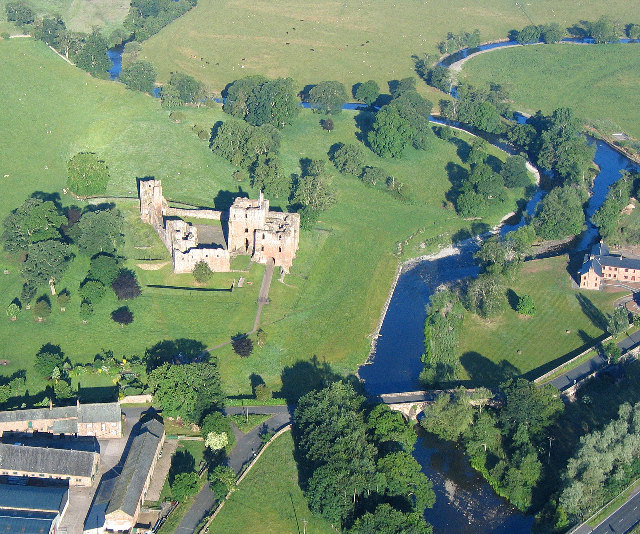
Brougham Castle was built in the north part of the Roman fort, which is off to the left of the photo, near the confluence of the River Eamont and River Lowther.

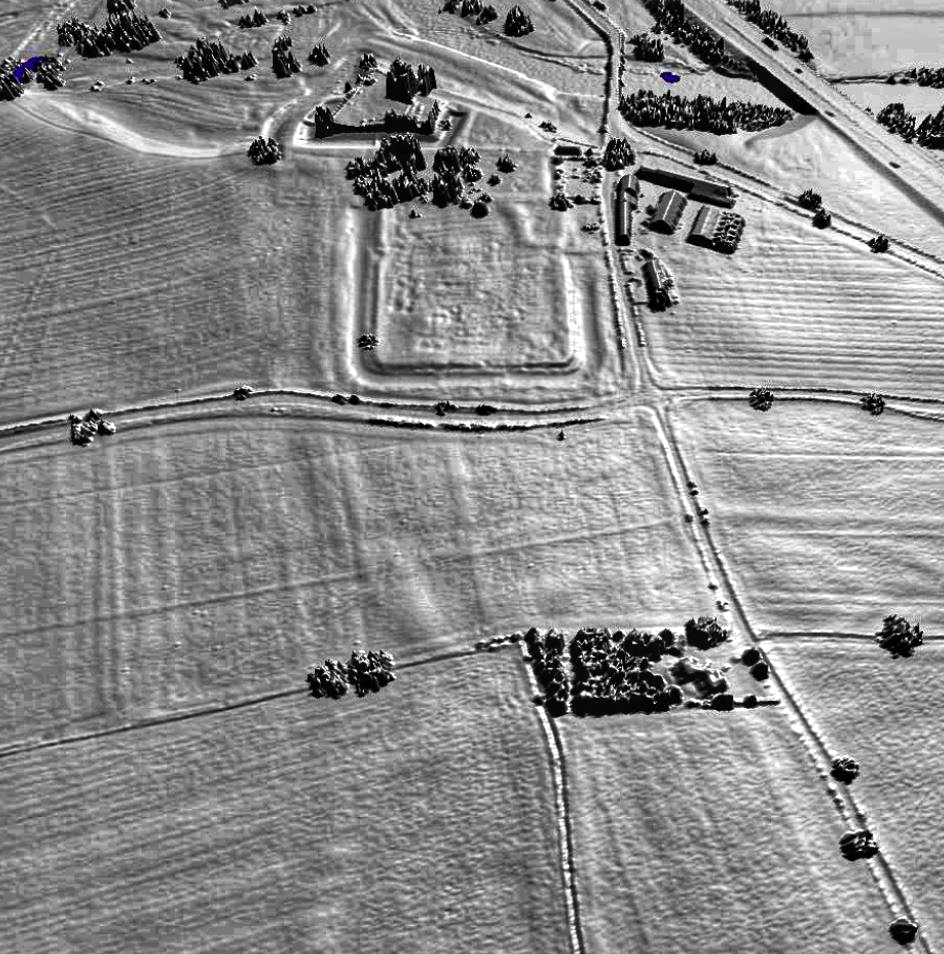
A lidar view of Brocavum Roman fort and Brougham Castle

Brocavum is the Latin name of a Roman fort at Brougham near Penrith, Cumbria. The fort survives as earthworks, but no excavation of these has been carried out so far.

== Location and date ==
With the rivers Eamont and Lowther flowing nearby and meeting to the west, the site had natural defences. As well as two rivers, three Roman roads intersected at the fort: the York - Scotch Corner - Stainmore Pass - Brough under Stainmore - Kirkby Thore - Brougham route (along the present A66); the Manchester/Lancaster - Burrow-in-Lonsdale - Middleton - Low Borrow Bridge (Tebay) - Brougham route (along the present West Coast rail line); and the Glannaventa (Ravenglass) Roman port - Hardknott - Galava (Ambleside) - High Street - Brougham route. From Brocavum (Brougham), the road went north to Luguvallium (Carlisle) via Old Penrith (along the present A6). From late Flavian times (80sAD) onwards, there may also have been a road from Old Penrith and/or Brocavum westwards to Troutbeck, to an undiscovered fort at Keswick, to the fort at Papcastle, and on to Alauna (Maryport).

There was also a civilian settlement (part of which was excavated in 2008 during construction of a pipeline from Hackthorpe to Penrith), and a cemetery (excavated in the 1960s), the evidence from the latter suggesting that an East European (Danubian) contingent of people lived there.

Six dedications to the local deity Belatucadrus were discovered at Brougham, suggesting perhaps "that his worship was centred there". It has been suggested that the focus of the Carvetii, a pre-Roman and Roman 'tribe' may have been nearby at Clifton Dykes. This may have been an additional factor, to the road and river ones mentioned above, in the positioning of the fort after the Roman conquest.

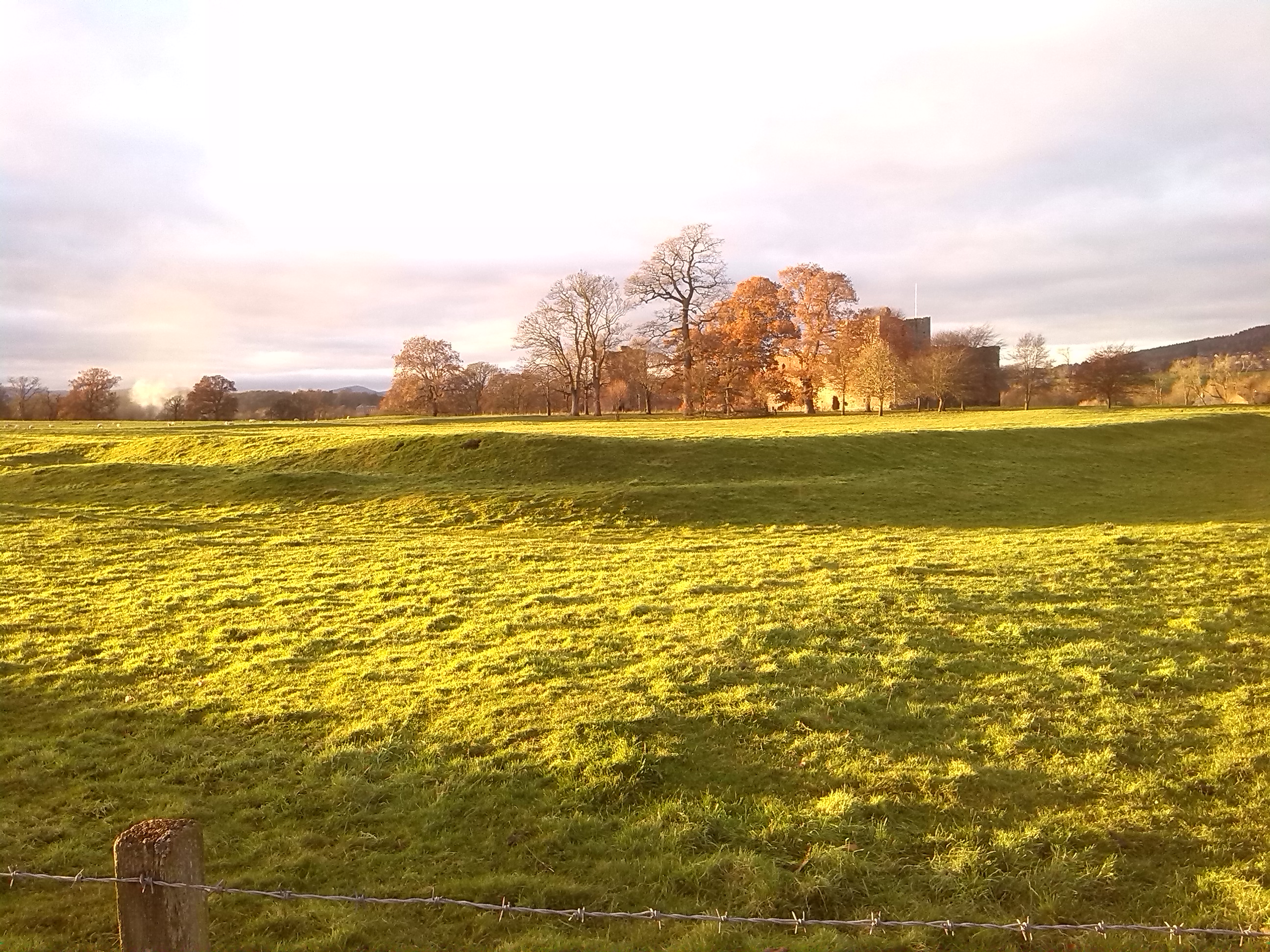
Banks of Brocavum Roman fort in foreground, Brougham Castle behind, and 18th-century Carleton Hall to the left

The dating of the fort is uncertain, but an important role from an early date is thought to be likely. The foundation date may be just after the revolt of Venutius in the early A.D.70s. An early-Flavian occupation is probable, even though the artefacts found in the excavation of the cemetery were from the second and third centuries A.D.

== Access and conservation ==
The medieval Brougham Castle now occupies part of the site, which is in the care of English Heritage. It is known that stones from the Roman fort were used in the construction of the castle, as a Roman tombstone can be seen in a passageway in the keep, used as a ceiling slab. The fort is scheduled as an Ancient Monument, along with the castle, as "Brougham Roman fort and Brougham Castle".

== See also ==
- Brough Castle
