= Lady Anne Clifford =

English peeress (1590–1676)

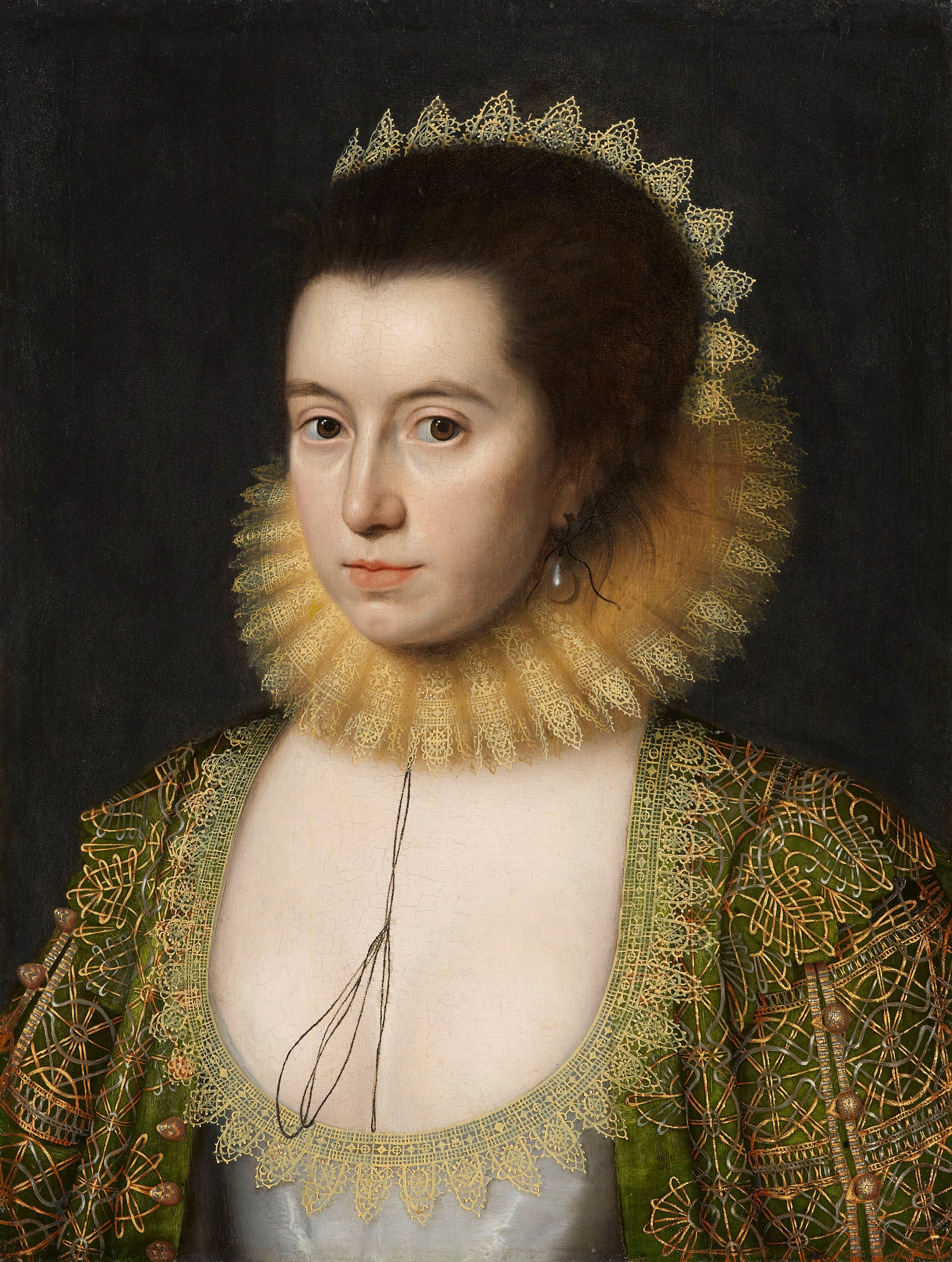
- Lady Anne Clifford, portrait by William Larkin, National Portrait Gallery, London

14th Baroness de Clifford
- Reign: 1605–1676
- Predecessor: George Clifford, 3rd Earl of Cumberland
- Successor: Nicholas Tufton, 3rd Earl of Thanet
- Born: 30 January 1590; Skipton Castle, England
- Died: 22 March 1676 (aged 86); Brougham Castle, England
- Buried: St Lawrence's Church, Appleby
- Noble family: Clifford
- Spouses: Richard Sackville, 3rd Earl of Dorset (m. 1609; died 1624) Philip Herbert, 4th Earl of Pembroke (m. 1630; died 1650)
- Issue: Margaret Tufton, Countess of Thanet; Isabella Compton, Countess of Northampton
- Father: George Clifford, 3rd Earl of Cumberland
- Mother: Lady Margaret Russell

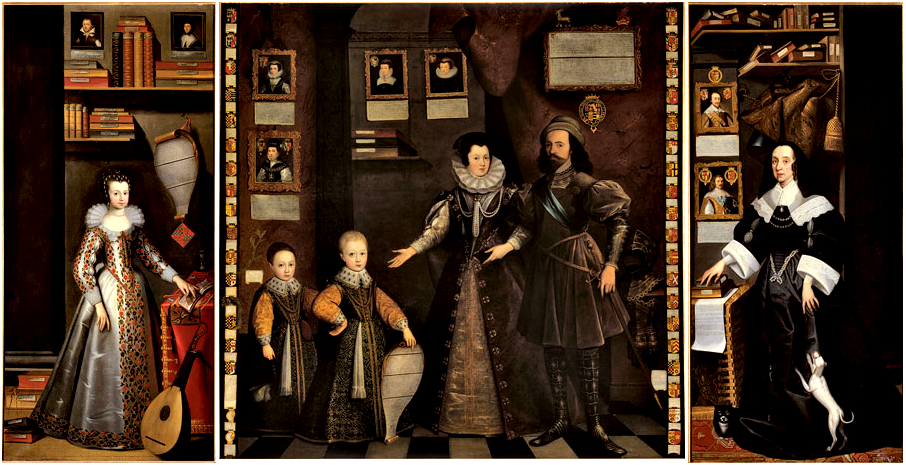
The Great Picture, a huge triptych measuring 8ft 5" high and 16ft 2" wide, commissioned in 1646 by Anne Clifford, attributed to Jan van Belcamp (1610–1653), formerly hanging in Appleby Castle and now displayed in the Abbot Hall Art Gallery in Kendal, Cumbria. It depicts Anne as a girl at left and as a mature woman at right. The central panel shows her parents and young brothers. The painting is replete with significant elements referring to her life and to her succession to her paternal inheritance, gained after a lengthy legal dispute.

Lady Anne Clifford, Countess of Dorset, Pembroke and Montgomery, suo jure 14th Baroness de Clifford (30 January 1590 – 22 March 1676) was an English peeress. In 1605 she inherited her father's ancient barony by writ and became suo jure 14th Baroness de Clifford, but for decades after was engaged in legal battles to get the property she saw as her inheritance. She was a patron of literature and as evidenced by her diary and many letters was a literary personage in her own right. She held the hereditary office of High Sheriff of Westmorland which role she exercised from 1653 to 1676.

== Early years ==
Lady Anne was born on 30 January 1590 in Skipton Castle, and was baptised the following 22 February in Holy Trinity Church in Skipton in the West Riding of Yorkshire. She was the only surviving child and sole heiress of George Clifford, 3rd Earl of Cumberland (1558–1605) of Appleby Castle in Westmorland and of Skipton Castle, by his wife, Lady Margaret Russell, daughter of Francis Russell, 2nd Earl of Bedford.

Her parents' marriage was soured by the deaths of Anne's two elder brothers before the ages of 5 and her parents lived apart for most of her childhood. The strain of the marriage was seen in the public realm as well, especially after the separation. Her father maintained an important position at the court of Elizabeth I, while her mother received no recognition in regard to her husband at court. As her parents were separated, her mother maintained a matriarchal position in her house, for the family was kept under her care.

Anne Clifford was brought up in an almost entirely female household—evoked in Emilia Lanier's Description of Cookeham—and received an excellent education from her tutor, the poet Samuel Daniel. As a child, she was a favourite of Elizabeth I. Accounts of her expenses in London and at Chenies between 1600 and 1602 mention her farthingale and wired rebato collar. She played the virginals, was taught to dance by Stephens, and musicians were employed at her masque entertainment.

In May 1603, Anne Clifford was staying at Northaw manor and went to see the new king, James VI and I, at Theobalds. In June, she rode north to Coventry to meet Anne of Denmark. She was not allowed to attend their coronation on 25 July for fear of the plague. She wrote a Memoir of events of 1603.

== Inheritance ==
On the death of her father on 30 October 1605, she succeeded suo jure to the ancient title Baroness de Clifford, a barony created by writ in 1299, but her father's earldom passed (according to the patent of its creation) as was usual, to the heir male, namely his younger brother Francis Clifford, 4th Earl of Cumberland (1559–1641), to whom he had willed his estates. He had bequeathed to Anne the sum of £15,000. In her young adulthood, she engaged in a long and complex legal battle to obtain the family estates, which had been granted by King Edward II (1307–1327) under absolute cognatic primogeniture, instead of the £15,000 willed to her.

Her main argument was that she was just 15 years old at the time. King James I supported her rival's claim. In January 1617, the queen, Anne of Denmark, encouraged Anne Clifford to pursue her claim and not accept a settlement promoted by King James. She recalled her meeting with Anne of Denmark in the withdrawing chamber at Whitehall Palace in her diary nearly six decades later. It was not until the death in 1643 without a male heir of Henry Clifford, 5th Earl of Cumberland, the 4th Earl's only son, that Anne Clifford managed to regain the family estates, although she did not obtain possession until 1649.

== At court ==
Anne Clifford never became a lady in waiting or lady of the queen's privy chamber, but she danced in masques with Anne of Denmark. She played the Nymph of the Air in Samuel Daniel's masque Tethys's Festival, and took roles in several of the early court masques by Ben Jonson, including The Masque of Beauty (1608) and The Masque of Queens (1609). In April 1613 she joined Anne of Denmark's progress to Bath.

== Marriages and children ==
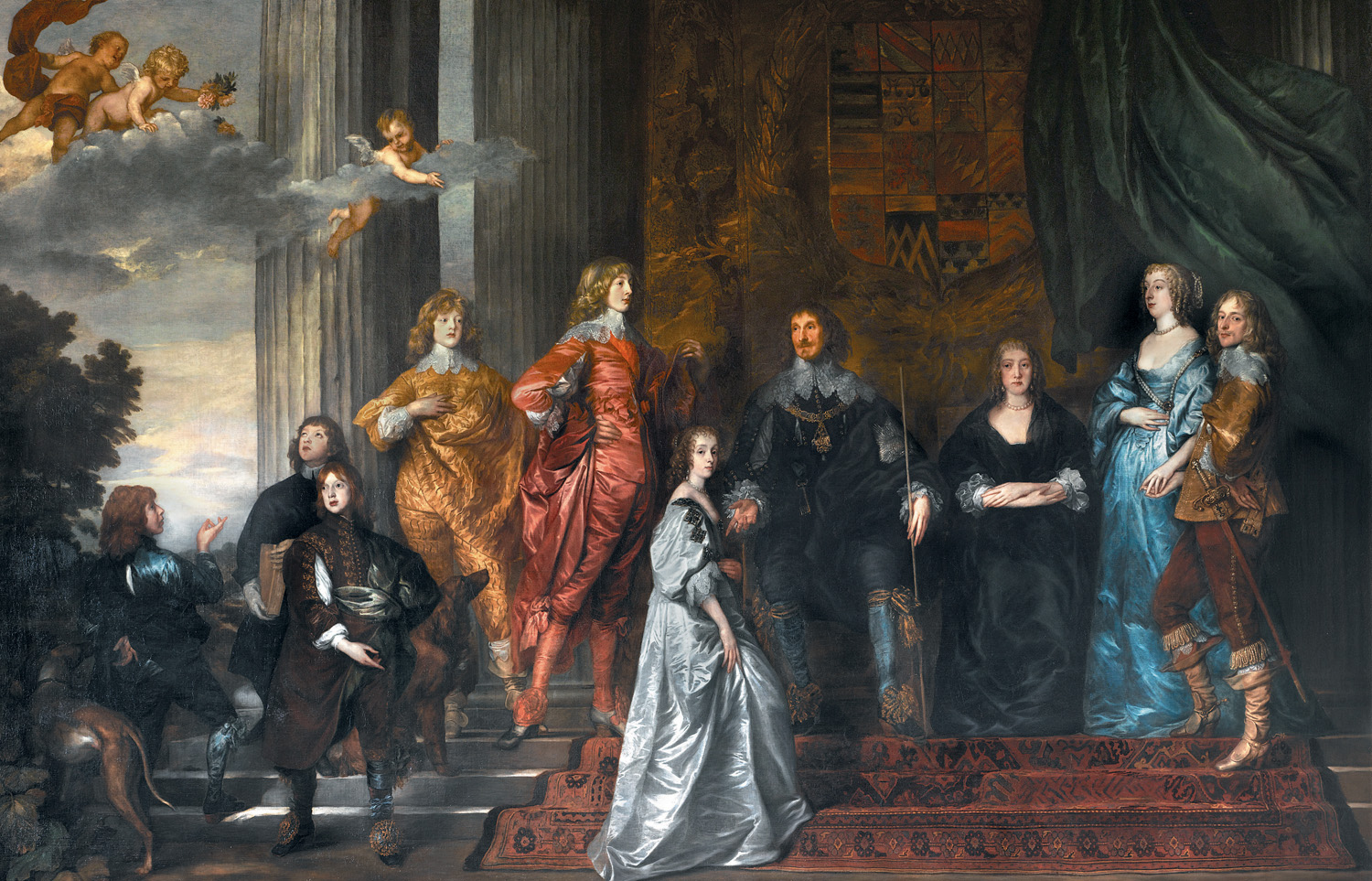
Lady Anne (in black) depicted with her second Husband, Philip Herbert, 4th Earl of Pembroke and his Family by Van Dyck. (Wilton House)

Lady Anne married twice. Firstly, on 27 February 1609 to Richard Sackville, 3rd Earl of Dorset (d.1624). Sackville's grandfather arranged the marriage, writing in April 1607 to ask the courtier George More of Loseley to influence the Countess of Cumberland for the match with "that virtuous young lady the Lady Anne". The old Earl of Dorset had to counter rumours against his family honour that he trumped negotiations for her hand from the heir to the Earl of Exeter. By her first husband Anne had five children, three sons who all died before adulthood and two daughters and co-heiresses:

- Lady Margaret Sackville (1614–1676), who married John Tufton, 2nd Earl of Thanet (1609–1664), by whom she had eleven children. The title Baron de Clifford descended in the Tufton family.
- Lady Isabella Sackville (1622–1661), who married James Compton, 3rd Earl of Northampton (1622–1681).

Secondly, in 1630, Anne married the wealthy Philip Herbert, 4th Earl of Pembroke and 1st Earl of Montgomery (1584–1650), whose first wife, Lady Susan de Vere had died the year before.

Both marriages were reportedly difficult; contemporaries cited Lady Anne's unyielding personality as a cause, whilst her cousin Edward Russell, 3rd Earl of Bedford, compared her to the River Rhone. A more sympathetic viewpoint would attribute some of the troubles in her first marriage to her husband's extravagance and his infidelities. Her first husband was a prominent figure at court. Her disagreement with her husband over her inheritance claims proved another source of difficulty within their marriage. Lord Dorset believed she should settle the inheritance case rather than pursue it. A central conflict with her second husband lay in her decision to allow her younger daughter to make her own choice of husband.

A list or catalogue of the household and family of the Earl and Countess of Dorset at Knole survives. It records the names and roles of servants. It includes two African servants, Grace Robinson, a maid in the laundry, and John Morockoe, who worked in the kitchen. Both are described as "Blackamoors".

== Maintaining favour at court ==
Lady Anne frequently went to London and the court, in November 1617, wearing a "green damask gown embroidered, without a farthingale". and met Lady Ruthin. Jane Drummond, Lady Roxburghe, and Lady Ruthin were her contacts in the queen's household. Ruthin took Anne Clifford's letters and gifts to Anne of Denmark, including a white satin gown embroidered with pearls and coloured silks. The pearls and embroidery cost Clifford £80 over the cost of the satin fabric. Clifford was admitted to the queen's bedchamber where she was able to talk to King James.

Clifford sent Lady Ruthin an expensive ruffled satin skirt with £100 worth of embroidery to present to Anne of Denmark. For a New Year's Day gift in January 1619, she sent Anne of Denmark a cloth of silver cushion embroidered with the Danish royal arms and embellished with slips of tent stitch. As well as patronising professional embroiderers, Anne embroidered a cushion with Irish stitch. Clifford last saw King James in January 1620 at Whitehall Palace after a masque in the Banqueting House. The show was Ben Jonson's News from the New World Discovered in the Moon.

== Patron of arts ==
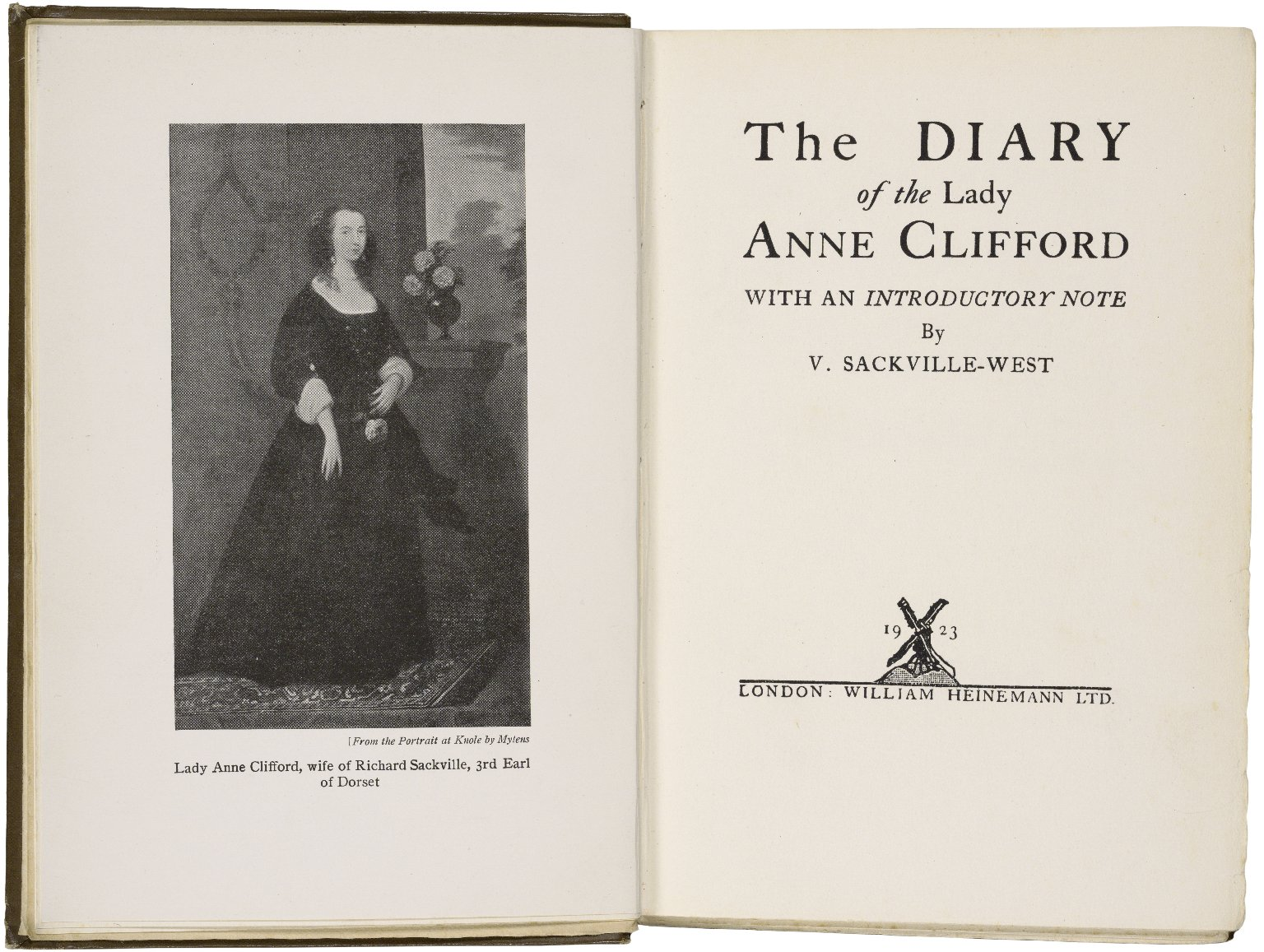
The title page of the first edition of Clifford's diaries, 1923.

She was an important patron of literature. She became a literary figure in her own right due to her own writings including her letters, and her memoirs and diary which circulated in manuscript. The oldest surviving manuscript was copied in the 1770s by Margaret Bentinck, Duchess of Portland. Vita Sackville-West published the text in full in 1923. John Donne said Lady Anne could "discourse of all things from Predestination to Slea-silk".

Jan van Belcamp painted a huge triptych portrait of Anne Clifford to her own design and specifications. Titled The Great Picture, it portrays Lady Anne at three points in her life: at age 56 (right), at age 15 (left), and before birth in her mother's womb (centre). In connection with the painting, Anne Clifford dated her own conception at 1 May 1589, an unusual act of precision. The painting can now be seen in the Abbot Hall Art Gallery in Kendal, Cumbria.

Anne sent a miniature portrait of herself to her mother the Countess of Cumberland in June 1615, writing, "I have sent you my picture done in little, which some says is very like me, and others say it does me rather wrong than flatters me, I know you will accept the shadow of her whose substance is come from yourself. I hope you will requite me with the same kindness and let me have yours when either you come up to London, or when so ever any that draw pictures comes into those parts where now you are."

== Building works ==
In 1656 she erected the Countess Pillar near Brougham, Cumbria, in memory of her late mother. This was the site of her last meeting with her mother in 1616. On the low stone beside it, money was given to the poor on the anniversary of their parting. This is commemorated annually on 2 April.

She restored churches at Appleby-in-Westmorland, Ninekirks, Brougham and Mallerstang. She was also responsible for the improvement and expansion of many of the Clifford family's castles across Northern England, including Skipton Castle in Yorkshire and Pendragon Castle, Brough Castle, Appleby Castle and Brougham Castle, all in Westmorland (now Cumbria).

== Later life and death ==
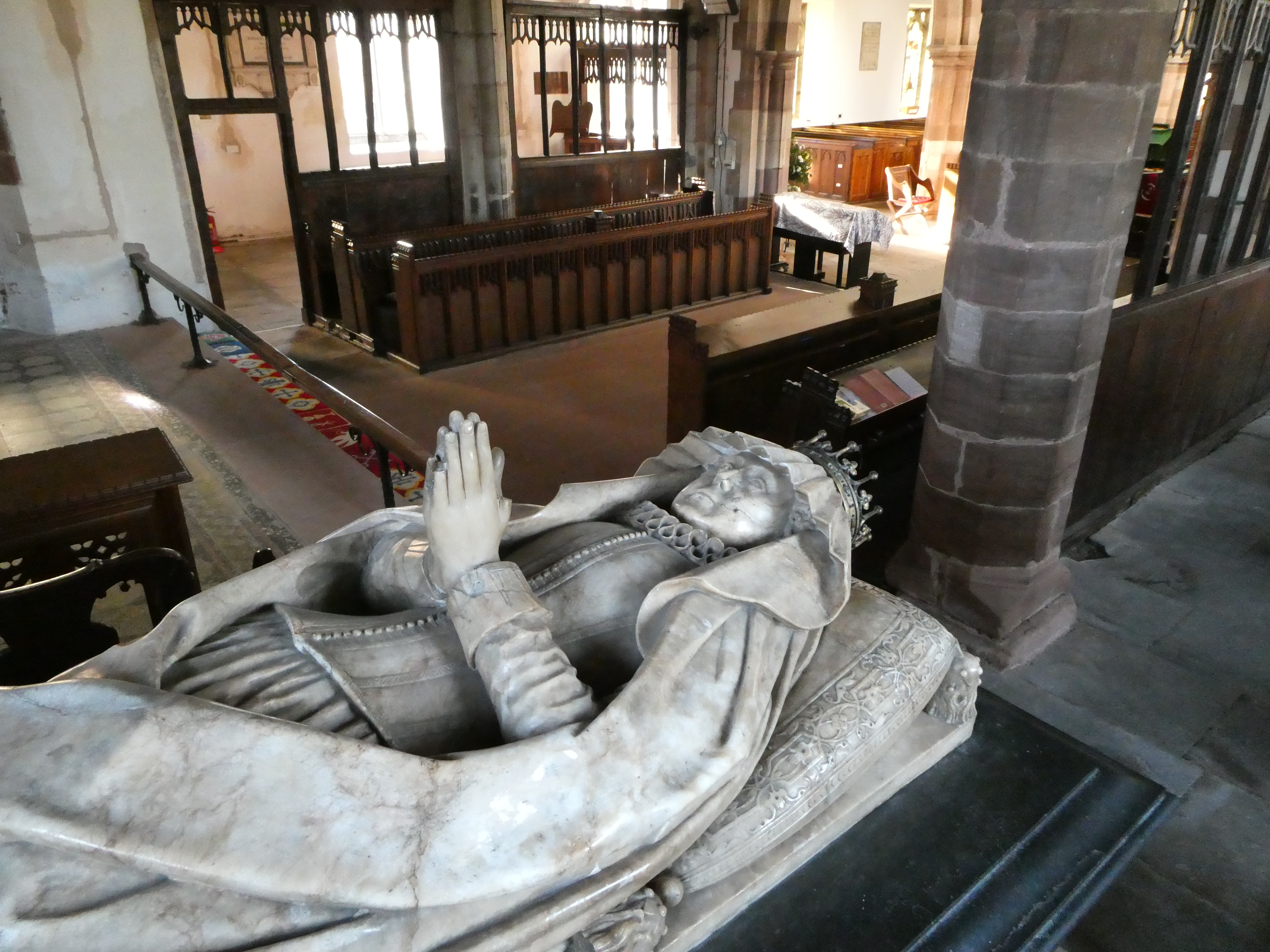
Tomb effigy of Margaret Clifford, Lady Anne's mother, in St Lawrence's Church, Appleby

After inheriting her father's estates in Westmorland, when the remaining male heirs (her uncle and his son) died out, Lady Anne thus became a wealthy landowner. She was loyal to the Crown during the Civil War, defending her estates until they fell to the Parliamentarians after the Battle of Marston Moor.

She was heavily involved with her tenants to the point of filing lawsuits against them and actively pursuing rents and debts owed to her. This was to be the demeanour of her power in later life, that of a direct landowner calling upon the traditions of the baronial class. After moving north, she rotated her residence amongst her castles, living in various ones for several months to a year at a time. Anne Clifford wrote her will at Pendragon Castle on 1 May 1674. Her bequests included a miniature of the Earl of Pembroke painted by Nicholas Hilliard and a string of scented pomander beads which had been given to her great grandmother by Mary I of England.

She died aged 86 at Brougham Castle, in the room in which her father had been born and her mother had died. At her death she was the Dowager Countess of Dorset, Pembroke, and Montgomery. Her tomb and monument is in St Lawrence's Church, Appleby-in-Westmorland.

== Notes ==
Peerage of England
Preceded by George Clifford	Baroness de Clifford; 1605–1676	Succeeded by Nicholas Tufton
