= Margaret Clifford, Countess of Cumberland =

English noblewoman

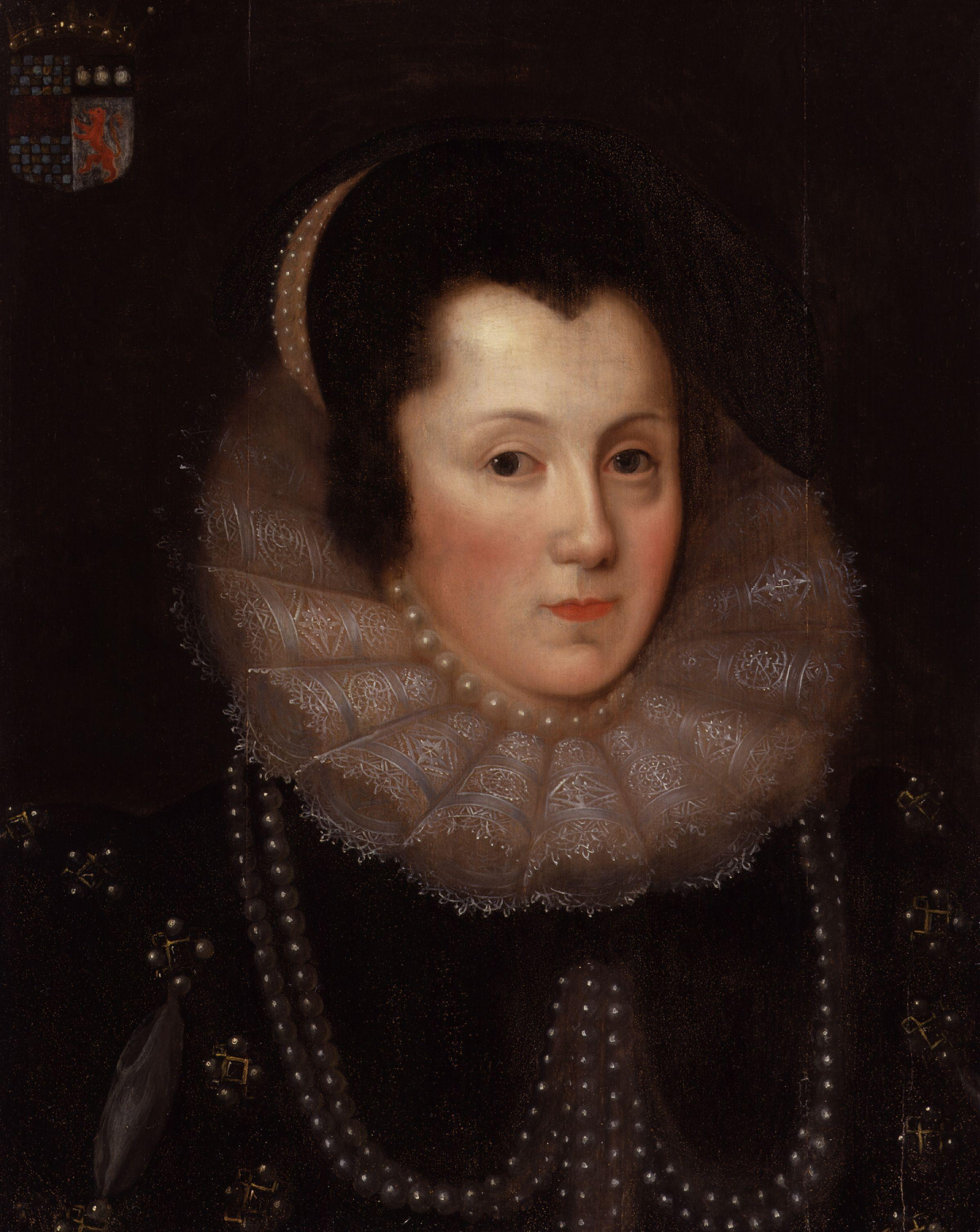
Portrait of Margaret Clifford, 1585

Margaret Clifford (née Russell), Countess of Cumberland (7 July 1560 – 24 May 1616) was an English noblewoman and maid of honor to Elizabeth I. Lady Margaret was born in Exeter, England to Francis Russell, 2nd Earl of Bedford and Margaret St John.

On 24 June 1577 she married George Clifford, 3rd Earl of Cumberland the son of Henry Clifford, 2nd Earl of Cumberland and Anne Dacre. Her sister, Anne Russell, Countess of Warwick, was married to Ambrose Dudley, brother of Robert Dudley, the Earl of Leicester, and Anne too was a great literary patron and a close friend to Queen Elizabeth I, attending her on her death bed.

In 1603 she travelled from London with her daughter Lady Anne Clifford and the Countess of Warwick to join others greeting Anne of Denmark and Prince Henry at Dingley, the house of Thomas Griffin on 24 June. Afterwards they rode with Anne Vavasour (later Lady Warburton) through Coventry to see Princess Elizabeth at Coombe Abbey. At this time her husband was not maintaining her, and she wrote to Sir Robert Cecil asking for his intervention so that she could buy suitable clothes to "furnish her self" to attend the new queen. The royal couple were entertained at Grafton Regis by her husband. Although the Countess was present, according to her daughter, she was marginalised, "not held as mistress of the house".

She was a patron of the poet Emilia Lanier.

In 1593, Lady Margaret Russell founded Beamsley Hospital, an almshouse for local widows.

She was interested in physic and alchemy, and had an alchemical recipe book compiled for her.

She died at Brougham Castle, on 24 May 1616.

The tomb of the Countess is at St Lawrence's Church, Appleby along with that of her daughter, Lady Anne Clifford. Lady Anne Clifford built the Countess Pillar to commemorate her.

== Children ==
- Francis Clifford (1584 – 8 December 1589)
- Robert Clifford (21 September 1585 – 24 May 1591)
- Lady Anne Clifford (30 January 1590 – 22 March 1676), who married Richard Sackville, 3rd Earl of Dorset, and secondly Philip Herbert, 4th Earl of Pembroke
