= Roman Cumbria =

Area of Roman Britain

Cumbria within England

Roman Cumbria was an area that lay on the north-west frontier of Roman Britain, and, indeed, of the Roman Empire itself. The decision to conquer the area was taken by the Romans after the revolt of Venutius threatened to make the Brigantes and their allies, such as the Carvetii, into anti-Roman tribes rather than pro-Roman ones, which had previously been the case. After a period of conquest and consolidation, based on the Stanegate line, with some coastal defences added, Hadrian decided to make the previous turf wall into a solid one. Although abandoned briefly in favour of the more northerly Antonine Wall, the Hadrianic line was fallen back upon and remained for the rest of the Roman period.

Such unrest as occurred during the Roman occupation seems that have been the result of either incursions by tribes to the north of the Wall, or as the result of factional disputes in Rome in which the Cumbrian military was caught up. There is no evidence of the Brigantian federation stirring up trouble. Romanisation of the population may therefore have occurred to varying degrees, especially near the forts.

== Conquest and consolidation, 71–117 AD ==
After the Romans' initial conquest of Britain in 43 AD, the territory of the Brigantes remained independent of Roman rule for some time. At that time the leader of the Brigantes was queen Cartimandua, whose husband Venutius might have been a Carvetian and may therefore have been responsible for the incorporation of Cumbria into the Brigantian federation. It may be that Cartimandua ruled the Brigantian peoples east of the Pennines (possibly with a centre at Stanwick), while Venutius was the chief of the Brigantes (or Carvetii) west of the Pennines in Cumbria (with a possible centre based at Clifton Dykes.)

Despite retaining nominal independence, Cartimandua and Venutius were loyal to the Romans and in return were offered protection by their Imperial neighbours. But the royal couple divorced, and Venutius led two rebellions against his ex-wife. The first, in the 50s AD, was quashed by the Romans, but the second, in AD 69, came at a time of political instability in the Empire and resulted in the Romans evacuating Cartimandua and leaving Venutius to reign over the Brigantes.

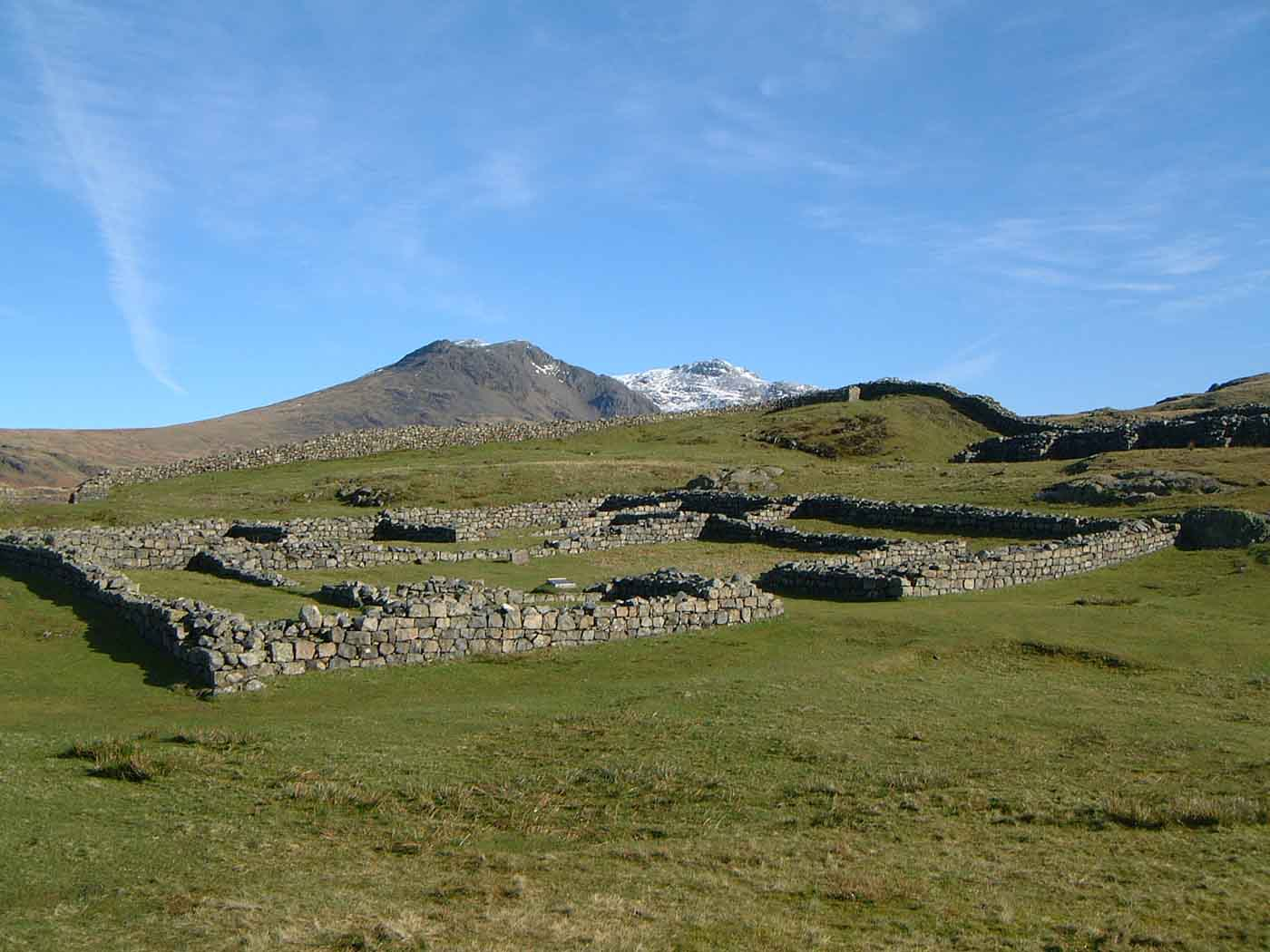
Hardknott Roman Fort

As Shotter says,"this situation, involving the removal from power of a Roman client-monarch, could not be allowed to last for long..." The Roman conquest of the Brigantes began two years later. Tacitus gives pride of place in the conquest of the north to Agricola (his father-in-law), who was later governor of Britain during 77-83 AD. However, it is thought that much had been achieved under the previous governorships of Vettius Bolanus (governor 69-71 AD), and of Quintus Petillius Cerialis (governor 71-74 AD). From other sources, it seems that Bolanus had possibly dealt with Venutius and penetrated into Scotland, and evidence from the carbon-dating of the gateway timbers of the Roman fort at Carlisle (Luguvalium) suggest that they were felled in 72 AD, during the governorship of Cerialis. Nevertheless, Agricola played his part in the west as commander of the legion XX Valeria Victrix, while Cerialis led the IX Hispania in the east. In addition, the Legio II Adiutrix sailed from Chester up river estuaries to cause surprise to the enemy.

It is likely that the western thrust was started from Lancaster, where there is evidence of a Cerialian foundation, and followed the line of the Lune and Eden river valleys through Low Borrow Bridge and Brougham (Brocavum). On the Cumbrian coast, evidence is scant, but perhaps Ravenglass and Blennerhasset, where there is evidence of one of the earliest Roman occupations in Cumbria, were involved. Beckfoot and Maryport may also have featured early on. At some point, part of Cerialis's force moved across the Stainmore Pass from Corbridge westwards to join Agricola, as evidenced by campaign camps (which may have been previously set up by Bolanus) at Rey Cross, Crackenthorpe, Kirkby Thore and Plumpton Head. Signal- or watch-towers are also in evidence across the Stainmore area - Maiden Castle, Bowes Moor and Roper Castle, for example. The two forces then moved up from the vicinity of Penrith to Carlisle, establishing the fort there in 72/73AD.

In 78 AD Agricola pushed north from Deva (Chester) to Carlisle and placed garrisons between the Solway Firth and the River Tyne, consolidating his gains over the following two years. Carlisle (and Corbridge in the east) were probably used by Agricola as bases and winter-quarters for his advance into Scotland during 79 AD. With the decline of imperial ambitions in Scotland (and Ireland) by 87 AD (the recall of Agricola in 83 AD and the withdrawal of the XX legion four years later), a consolidation based on the line of the Stanegate road (between Carlisle and Corbridge) was settled upon. Carlisle was the seat of a 'centurio regionarius' (or 'district commissioner'), indicating its important status.

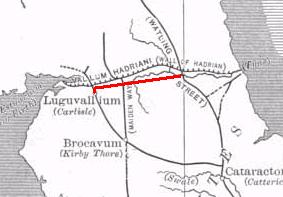
The Stanegate line is marked in red, to the south of the later Hadrian's Wall. (n.b. Brocavum is Brougham, not Kirkby Thore as given in the map)

The years 87 AD - 117 AD were ones of consolidation of the northern frontier area. Only a few sites north of the Stanegate line were maintained, and the signs are that an orderly withdrawal to the Solway-Tyne line was made. There does not seem to have been any rout caused as a result of battles with various tribes. Agricola may have left watchtowers at Burgh-by-Sands, Farnhill, Easton (Finglandrigg) and possibly Bowness-on-Solway. Other watchtowers at Crooklands, Cummersdale and Gamelsby Ridge protecting the agricultural coastal plain may also have existed from this time. The Stanegate road was augmented by large forts: Vindolanda (Northumberland) may date from around 85 AD, other forts dating from the mid-80's were constructed at Newbrough and at Carvoran (in present-day Northumberland), Nether Denton, and Brampton in Cumbria. Modifications to the Stangate line, with the reduction in the size of the forts and the addition of fortlets and watchtowers between them, seems to have taken place from the mid-90s onwards.

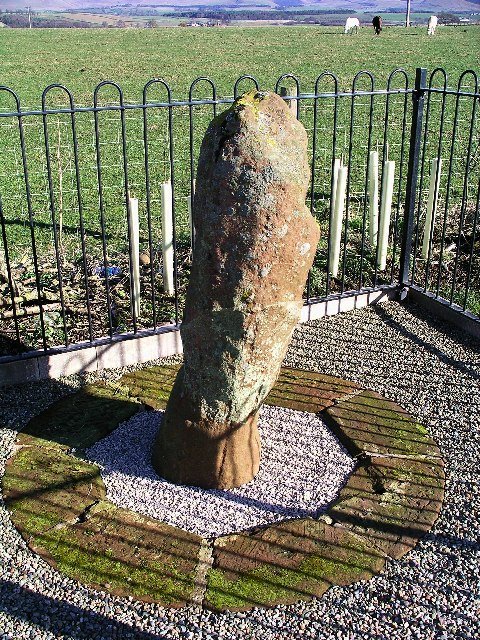
Roman milestone still in situ by the A66 near Kirkby Thore

Apart from the Stanegate line, other forts existed along the Solway Coast at Beckfoot, Maryport, Burrow Walls (near to the present town of Workington) and Moresby (near to Whitehaven). These forts have Hadrianic inscriptions, but some (Beckfoot, for example), may have dated from the late 1st century. The road running from Carlisle to Maryport had turf-and-timber forts along it at Old Carlisle (Red Dial), Caer Mote, and Papcastle (which may have had special responsibility for looking after the largely untouched Lake District region). The forts in the east along the Eden and Lune valley road at Old Penrith, Brougham and Low Borrow Bridge may have been enlarged, but the evidence is scanty. A fort at Troutbeck may have been established from the period of Trajan (emperor 98 AD - 117 AD) onwards, along with an uncertain road running between Old Penrith and/or Brougham, through Troutbeck (and possibly an undiscovered fort in the Keswick area) to Papcastle and Maryport. Other forts that may have been established during this period include one at Ambleside (Galava), positioned to take advantage of ship-borne supply to the forts of the Lake District. From here, a road was constructed during the Trajanic period to Hardknott where a fort was built (the fort at Ravenglass, where the road eventually finished, was built in the following reign of Hadrian (117 AD - 138 AD)). A road between Ambleside to Old Penrith and/or Brougham, going over High Street, may also date from this period. From the fort at Kirkby Thore (Bravoniacum), which stood on the road from York to Brougham (following the present A66), there was also a road, the Maiden Way, that ran north across Alston Edge to the fort at Whitley Castle (Epiacum) and on to the one at Carvoran on the Wall. In the south of the county, forts may have existed from this period south of Ravenglass and in the Barrow and Cartmel region. The only one that survives is at Watercrook (Kendal).

== Hadrian, Antoninus and Severus, 117–211 AD ==
Between 117 and 119, there may have been a war with the Britons, perhaps in the western part of the northern region, involving the tribes in the Dumfries and Galloway area. The Vita Hadriani ('Life of Hadrian', vol.2), the biography of Hadrian, indicates that, at the beginning of his reign, the Britons "could not be kept under control". Likewise, Marcus Cornelius Fronto, writing a decade later to the emperor Marcus Aurelius, compared the losses in Britain to those sustained in the Jewish Revolt. Whether this unrest included some kind of military disaster in Trajanic times or in the early part of Hadrian's reign, perhaps involving the Legio IX Hispana, or whether the fighting was north or south of the Stanegate limes is open to dispute. The response was to provide a frontier zone in the western sector of forts and milecastles, built of turf and timber (the "Turf Wall"), the standard construction method (although some have suggested it was because "turf and timber were preferred on the Solway plain, where stone is scarce").

For whatever reason, this was not enough for the emperor Hadrian (emperor 117 AD - 138 AD). Perhaps the decision to build the Wall was taken because of the seriousness of the military situation, or because it fitted in with the new emperor's wish to consolidate the gains of the empire and to delimit its expansion, as happened on the German frontier, (or possibly both). Hadrian, who was something of an amateur architect, came to Britain in 122 AD to oversee the building of a more solid frontier (along with other measures elsewhere in England). It is possible that Hadrian stayed at Vindolanda (in present-day Northumberland) while planning the wall. Building of Hadrian's Wall began in 122 AD and was mostly completed in less than ten years, such was the efficiency of the Roman military. It ran from Bowness on the Solway Firth across the north of the county and through Northumberland to Wallsend on the Tyne estuary, with additional military installations running down the Cumbrian coast from Bowness to Risehow, south of Maryport, in an integrated fashion (and with forts at Burrow Walls and Moresby that were perhaps not part of the system).

Historians believe that the Turf Wall from the River Irthing to Bowness-on Solway was rebuilt in stone in two stages. The most easterly five miles were rebuilt at the time of Hadrian, with the remainder being rebuilt after 150 AD. However, this is open to dispute: it is uncertain whether the building works in the second half of the 2nd century were repairs to the Wall made after the abandonment of the Antonine line, or were actually completion in stone of the unfinished turf section. The second possibility might account for the finding of civilian inscription stones relating to the building of the Wall (the 'Civitas stones') - the construction of the Wall has usually been thought of as a strictly military operation.

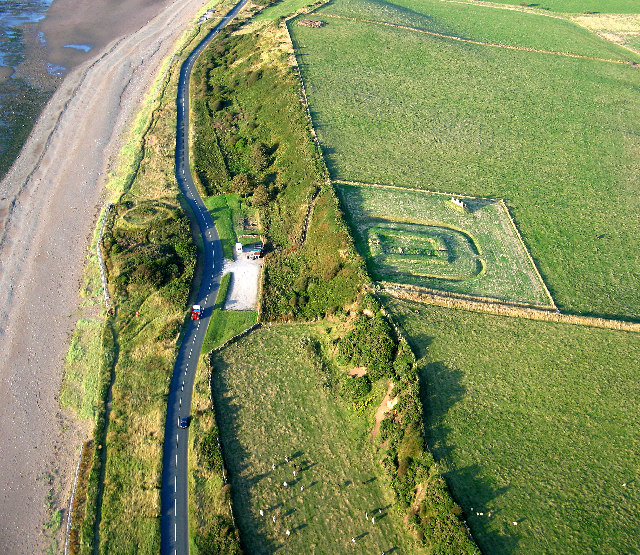
Milefortlet 21 at Crosscanonby on the Cumbrian coast, with later, 18th-century, saltpans across the road to the left

There were several forts and milecastles along the Cumbrian half of the wall, the largest of which was Petriana (Stanwix), housing a cavalry regiment and which was probably the Wall's headquarters (perhaps indicating that the serious unrest was taking place in this western sector of the frontier, or perhaps it was halfway along the distance of the Wall plus the Solway coast installations). Nothing of Petriana has survived, the largest visible remains in Cumbria now belong to the fort at Birdoswald - very little of the Wall itself can be seen in Cumbria. Running to the north of the Wall was a ditch, and to the south an earthwork (the Vallum). Initially, forts were maintained on the Stanegate line, but in around 124 AD - 125 AD the decision was taken to build forts on the Wall itself, and the Stanegate ones were closed down. The Roman forts of Cumbria are "auxiliary forts" - that is, housing auxiliary units of infantry and cavalry, rather than a legion, as at Chester. So-called 'outpost-forts', with road links to the Wall, were built north of the Wall, probably at about the time the Wall itself was built in its turf and timber form. They include Bewcastle and Netherby in Cumbria, and Birrens in Dumfriesshire.

The Wall was built on the orders of the emperor to try to create a solid northern frontier for the Roman Empire and keep the Brigantes and neighbouring Scoti under control - some tribes (for example, the Novantae in Dumfries/Galloway and perhaps the Selgovae) were hostile to Rome. Other reasons for the building of the Wall may include the following: it helped to define who was part of "Britannia" and who was not; it gave Hadrian (and the Romans) a spectacular achievement to bolster their view of themselves as the major power in the world; and it controlled trade and movement across the frontier zone (perhaps for revenue-gathering reasons). The Solway coastal defences were probably intended to prevent outflanking attacks by the Novantae, but also to prevent economic raiding on the Solway farming communities, which may have been important suppliers of provisions for the Wall's soldiers.

Taking a wider view, the relative density of Roman military in the north (along the Wall and its hinterland) presents the thorny problem of whether the Carvetii and other northern tribes were simply uncivilised and required a large army presence for internal security reasons; or, whether the army numbers were such as to deal with external enemies beyond the Wall. (Other possible reasons include the protection of mining industries, and to provide a reserve of troops that could be called upon elsewhere in the Empire). One historian believes that, on the whole, the reason was to "protect the province from attack" (by outside forces, that is).

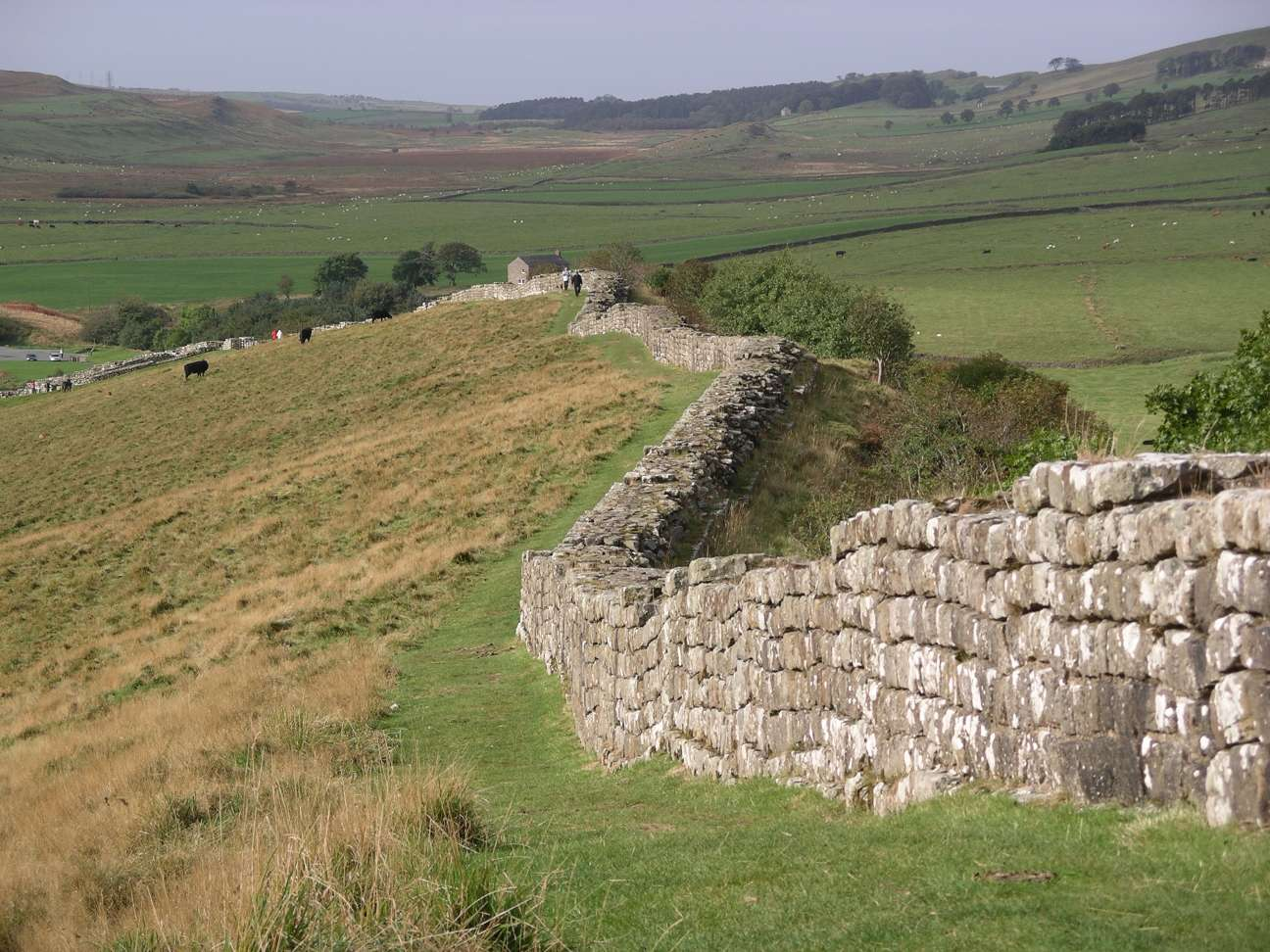
Hadrian's Wall

Only twenty years after Hadrian's Wall was started, Antoninus Pius (emperor 138 AD - 161 AD) almost completely abandoned it in 138 AD, a few months after his accession, turning his attentions to his own frontier fortification, the Antonine Wall across central Scotland. Perhaps he wanted to include possible enemies (and friends) within a frontier zone, rather than beyond it, as with Hadrian's scheme. The two walls were not held in conjunction and the coastal fortifications were de-militarised as well. But Antoninus failed to secure control of southern Scotland and the Romans returned to Hadrian's Wall, which was refurbished, in 164 AD, after which garrisons were retained there until the early 5th century.

The Wall had cut the Carvetti's territory in half and it is possible that there was a certain amount of local raiding and uncertainty derived from them and possibly other local tribes to the north of the Wall. The early 160s saw troubles of some kind on the northern frontier. Continual building of the northern frontier region took place during the turn of the 2nd and 3rd centuries, indicating further troubles. In around 180, the Wall was crossed by hostile forces who defeated one of the Roman armies. However, in the 170s and 180s the real pressure, in terms of disturbances, seems to have come from tribes much further north - the Caledones in particular. Events came to a head when the emperor Septimius Severus, intending to attack the Caledones, established himself at York in 209 AD, designating it the capital of the northern region (although this region, Britannia Inferior, may not have been formally established until after his death in 211). He also strengthened Hadrian's Wall and he may have established the "civitas" (a form of local government) of the Carvetii with its centre at Carlisle (Luguvalium).

== Prosperity, troubles, and the 'return to tribalism', 211–410 AD ==
The settlement of Severus, carried forward diplomatically by his son Caracalla, led to a period of relative peace in the north, which may have lasted for most of the 3rd-century (we are severely hampered by the lack of sources concerning the northern frontier for most of the 3rd century, so this may be a false picture). For the first half of the century, it appears that the forts were kept in good repair and the coastal defences were probably not being used regularly. Power may have been shared between the Civitas and the Roman military. Some forts, such as Hardknott and Watercrook, may have been de-militarised, and parts of the Wall seem to have fallen into disrepair. Evidence of smaller barrack-blocks being built, as at Birdoswald, suggest reduced manning by the army and a sharing between the military and civilian population. Changes in the military across the empire, (such as advancement of soldiers not from the senatorial classes plus greater use of 'barbarian' skilled workers), led to a more lax discipline.

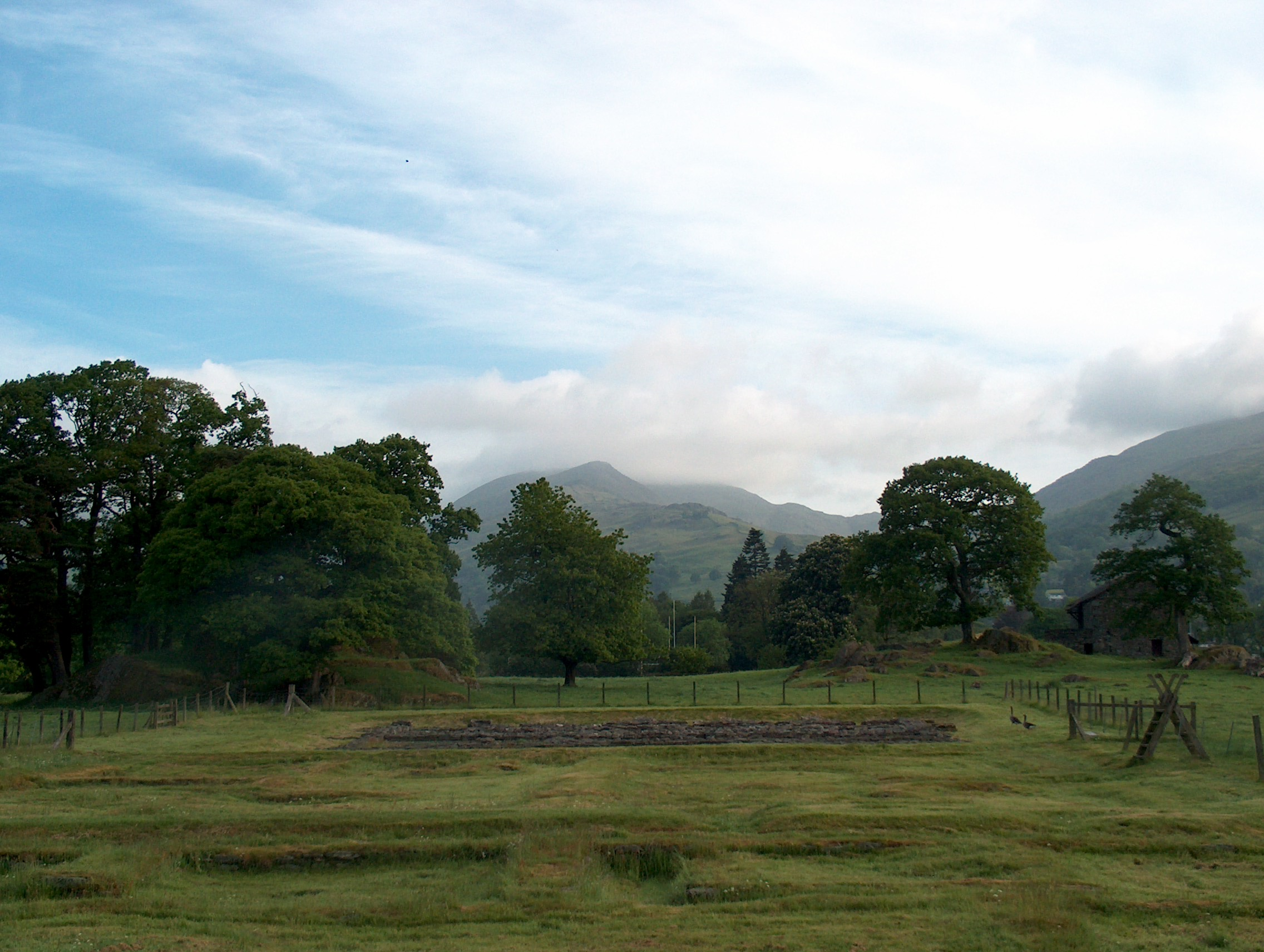
Galava Roman fort, Ambleside

Despite a more settled existence in places like Cumbria, internal strains began to affect the empire as a whole. The internal promotion reform in the army led to various people expecting promotions, which they may not have been given, and this led to tensions and violent outbreaks. Monetary inflation and splits amongst the rulers began to occur in the empire, as various pretenders vied for power in Rome, and these had deleterious effects in Britain. Rebellions in Gaul (259) and by Carausius, a naval commander who usurped power in Britain, and Allectus, who did the same (286), may have affected troops in Cumbria who were forced to take sides: a military clerk was killed at Ambleside, for example. The fight against Allectus may have led to the frontier being denuded of troops in the late 3rd century, with consequent attacks from the north. There is evidence of fire-damage at Ravenglass and other damage elsewhere in the north. The emperor Constantius I came to Britain twice to put down trouble (in 296, defeating Allectus, and in 305 fighting the Picts), and there is evidence of rebuilding taking place. In the early 4th century, defence-in-depth seems to have become the strategy in the frontier area, with the Wall becoming less of a 'curtain' barrier and more reliance being placed on the forts as 'strongpoints'.

The reforms of the emperors Diocletian and Constantine led to prosperity, in the south of the country at least, but this stability did not long outlast the death of Constantine in 337. The 330s and 340s saw a return to civil wars in the empire and, again, Britain was affected. It may be that the visit of the emperor Constans to Britain in 342-343 was to do with disaffection amongst British troops or "apparently to deal with problems on the northern frontier.". It is possible that the west coast of England and Wales was strengthened in a way similar to that of the southern ('Saxon Shore') defensive system. How this affected the Cumbrian coast is uncertain, but it appears that the forts at Ravenglass, Moresby, Maryport and Beckfoot were maintained and occupied, and there is evidence that some of the Hadrianic coastal fortlets and towers were reoccupied, such as at Cardurnock (milefortlet 5).

The usurpation of Magnentius and his defeat in 353 may have further increased troubles in Britannia. Attacks on the province took place in 360 and, some years later, secret agents, known as the Areani (or 'Arcani'), operating between Hadrian's Wall and the Vallum as intelligence-gatherers, were involved in the Great Conspiracy of 367-368. They were accused of going over to the enemies of the empire, such as the Picts, the Scotti (from Ireland), and the Saxons, in return for bribes and the promise of plunder.

Some of the 'outpost-forts' north of the Wall, and others such as Watercrook, seem not to have been maintained after 367, but Count Theodosius, or maybe local 'chieftains', did a fair amount of rebuilding and recovery work elsewhere. There is evidence of a narrowing of the gateway at Birdoswald, and structural changes at Bowness-on-Solway and Ravenglass, for example. There may also have been new fortlets at Wreay Hall and Barrock Fell, and possibly at Cummersdale, all south of Carlisle.

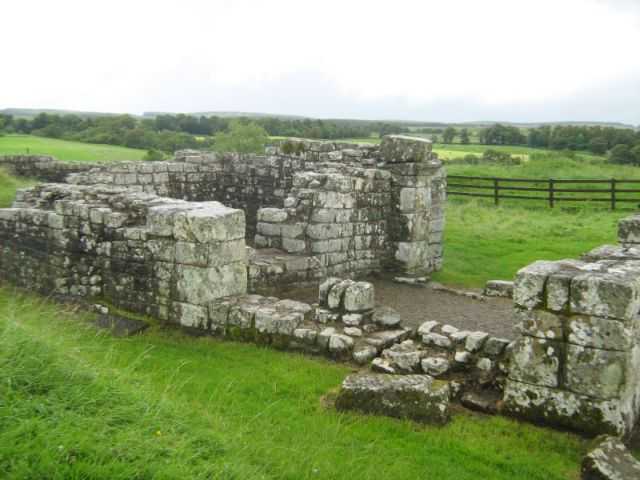
Birdoswald - showing partial blockage of main (east) gateway

After the 360s there appears to have been a 'marked decline in the occupation of vici', possibly due to the clearing out of the 'areani' by Theodosius. Also, army supplies were increasingly shipped in from imperial factories on the continent. The continuous loss of numbers of troops (drawn away to fight elsewhere), plus the ravages of inflation, meant that there was little reason left for local inhabitants of the vici to remain. The raids by the Picts and Scots in the late 4th and early 5th centuries (the so-called 'Pictish Wars'), meant increasing strain. For example, between 385 and 398 (when Stilicho cleared the raiders out), Cumbria was 'left to its own devices'.

The various phases of remodelling of the Birdoswald fort in the second half of the 4th century suggest that it was becoming more like a local warlord's fortress than a typical Roman fort. It may be that local people were looking more to their own defence (perhaps influenced by Pelagian thought about self-salvation), as Roman authority waned (for example, taxation-gathering and payment to the troops gradually ceased). In the northern frontier area at least, it looks as though the local Roman fort commander became the local warlord, and the local troops became the local militia operating a local 'protection racket', without any direction from above. This was what Higham called a "return to tribalism", dating perhaps from as early as 350 onwards. The Roman 'abandonment' of Cumbria (and Britain as a whole) was therefore not a sudden affair, as the famous advice of Honorius in 410, supposedly to the Britons ( that is, to look to their own defence) suggests. The Romano-British, in the north at least, had been doing that for some time.

== Life in Roman Cumbria ==
The severe lack of available evidence makes it difficult to draw a picture of what life was like in Roman Cumbria, and to what extent Romanisation took place (although the Vindolanda tablets give us a glimpse of Roman life on the, mostly, pre-Hadrian's Wall frontier). The auxiliary troops stationed in the forts obviously had an impact. Land around forts was appropriated for various uses - parade grounds, annexes (as at Carlisle), land given to retired troops for farming use, mining operations (copper in the Lake District, lead and silver around Alston), and so on. Around most forts, a Vicus (plural, 'vici') - a civilian settlement - may have been established, consisting of merchants, traders, artisans and camp-followers, drawn to the business opportunities provided by supplying the troops. The beginnings of something like town-life can be seen, but probably not with the same extent of urbanisation and wealth as in the south of England.

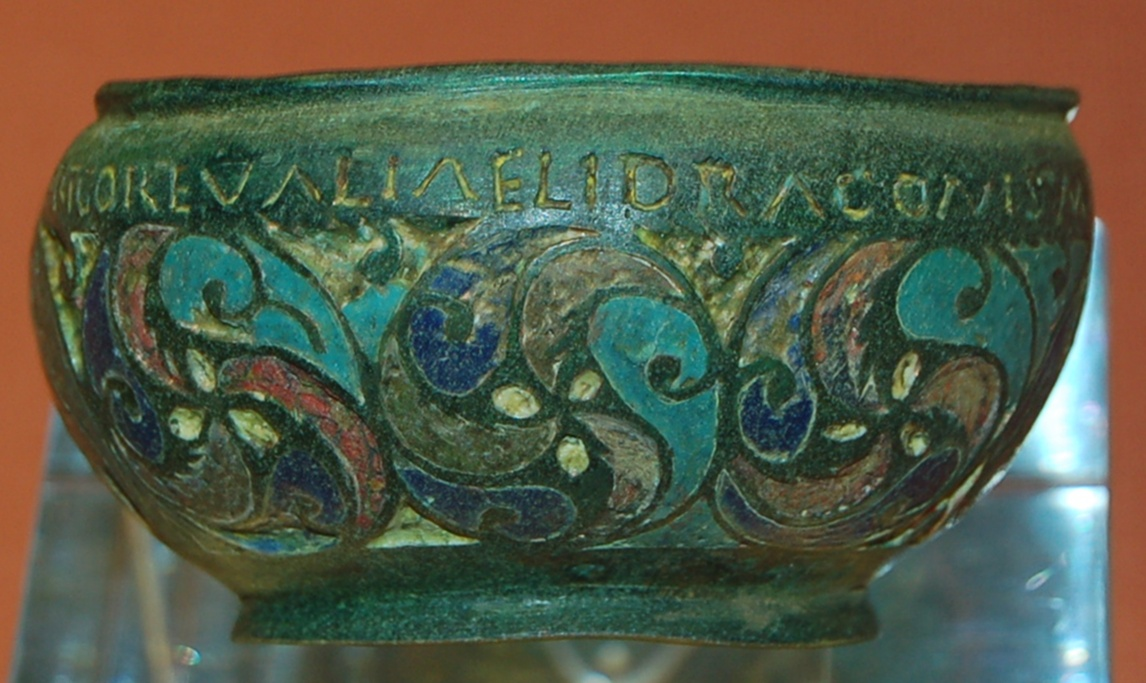
The Staffordshire Moorlands Pan - an enamelled cooking and serving vessel, engraved with the names of four Hadrian's Wall forts sited in Cumbria (2nd century AD). See also the article on the Rudge Cup and Amiens skillet

'Vici' associated with auxiliary forts followed the communication routes used by the Romans (in addition to the ones related to Hadrian's Wall). In the West Cumbrian plain, at Old Carlisle there was an extended vicus. The vicus at Beckfoot has yet to be investigated, but the one at Alauna (Maryport) was subject to some work during 2014. Other 'vici' existed at Nether Denton, in the Irthing valley, and at Old Penrith and Brocavum (Brougham), which were on the road from Carlisle through the Eden valley, the road then splitting with one route going south through the valley of the Lune, the other going east across the Stainmore gap to York.

Apart from settlements associated with the forts, Roman Cumbria consisted of scattered rural settlements, situated where good agricultural ground was to be found in the Solway Plain, the West Coastal Plain, and in the valleys of the Eden, Petteril and Lune. Archaeological evidence for these sites is thin and is mostly based on aerial surveys of crop marks. There is a bias towards sites in more upland areas, since lowland sites have been subject to extensive ploughing or development. The major sites identified include the following. In the Solway Plain and southern Scotland area there are Holme Abbey, Fingland, Wolsty Hall, around Old Carlisle, along the Annan Valley, east and west of Dumfries, around Newton Stewart and Wigtown Bay, along the valley of the River Wampool, at Silloth Farm, and Risehow. Along the Eden and Petteril valleys we have Dobcross Hall, Stockdalewath, Clifton Dykes, Old Penrith, Brocavum, Kirkby Thore, Yanwath Woodhouse. In the upper valleys of the Eden and Lune are Long Marton, Murton, Dufton, Berrier Hill, Waitby, Crosby Garrett (near to which a fine Roman cavalry display helmet was discovered in 2010), Ravenstonedale, between Crosby Ravensworth and Sunbiggin, in the Kirkby Stephen area, Eller Beck. In the central Lakes there is Aughertree Fell.

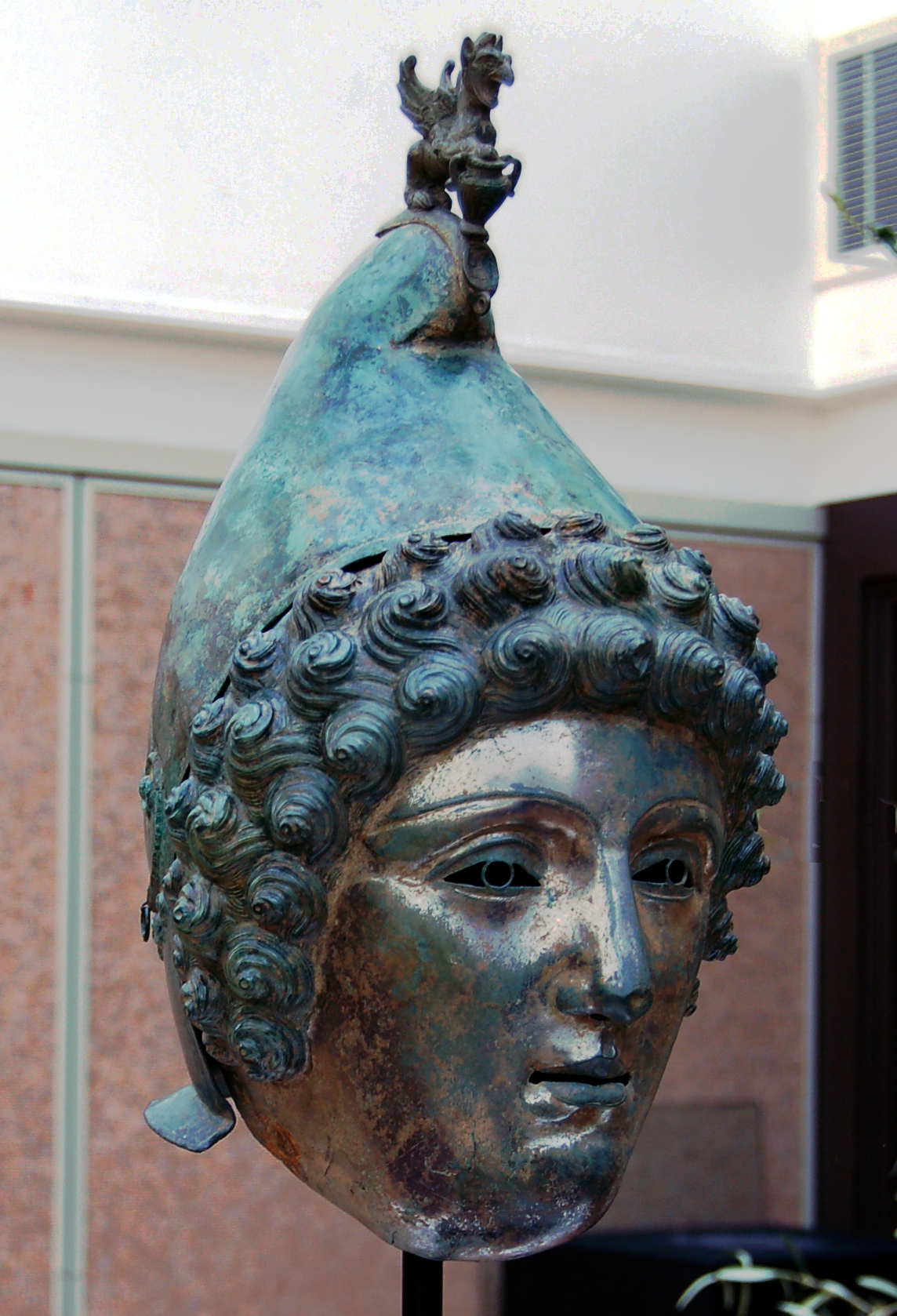
The Crosby Garrett Helmet (private collection)

The traditional Iron Age roundhouse, enclosed by a ditch and revetted bank, was used by the Carvetii during the first half of the Roman period. Sometimes, dry-stone walls were used instead of the bank. In the mid-Roman period, probably in the 3rd-century, a change took place in that the round structures were replaced by rectilinear buildings on some sites - this may reflect a desire to copy the Roman-style building type found around the forts. However, caution has to be taken here, as round (curvilinear) and rectangular buildings seem also to have existed at the same time. Lower, valley-located, houses were often of timber and thatch; upper-slope buildings were more likely to be of stone, as the timber had already been taken for building and the land used for pasture. There is a lack of the Roman villa estate set-up to be found in the south of England.

Most of the population, the total size of which at its peak has been estimated at between 20,000-30,000 people, lived in scattered, but not isolated, communities, usually consisting of just a single family group. They practised mixed agriculture, with enclosures for arable use, but also with enclosed and unenclosed pasture fields. During the second half of the Roman occupation, there seems to have been a move from agricultural land to pasture and 'waste' with building of walls and barriers - perhaps due either to a fall-off in demand for grain locally, consequent on the decline of the Roman military establishment, or to a drop in productivity.

It is difficult to assess the long-term effects of the Roman occupation on the native inhabitants of Cumbria. Everyone would certainly have been aware of their arrival in the area, and their final departure, but the locals were left much more to their own devices than those in the south of England. No doubt there was some Romanisation of the local culture, specifically among the governing élites who worked closely with the Roman military. Also, near the forts and associated 'vici', the rural population would have been providing foodstuffs and other goods (such as hides, wool, horn). Industrial working, such as the production of pottery, mining of lead, copper, quarrying of stone, although undoubtedly managed by the Roman forces, would have employed local people. So, there would probably have been a fair amount of contact, willing or not, between the Roman and Celtic peoples. The evidence gleaned from artefacts such as the Staffordshire Moorlands Pan (also known as the Ilam Pan), suggests that a Romano-British adaptation of Celtic art persisted in Cumbria. One expert says that "Celtic tradition survived in Roman disguise", and that "the Romanisation of Britain was in many ways nothing but a surface veneer."

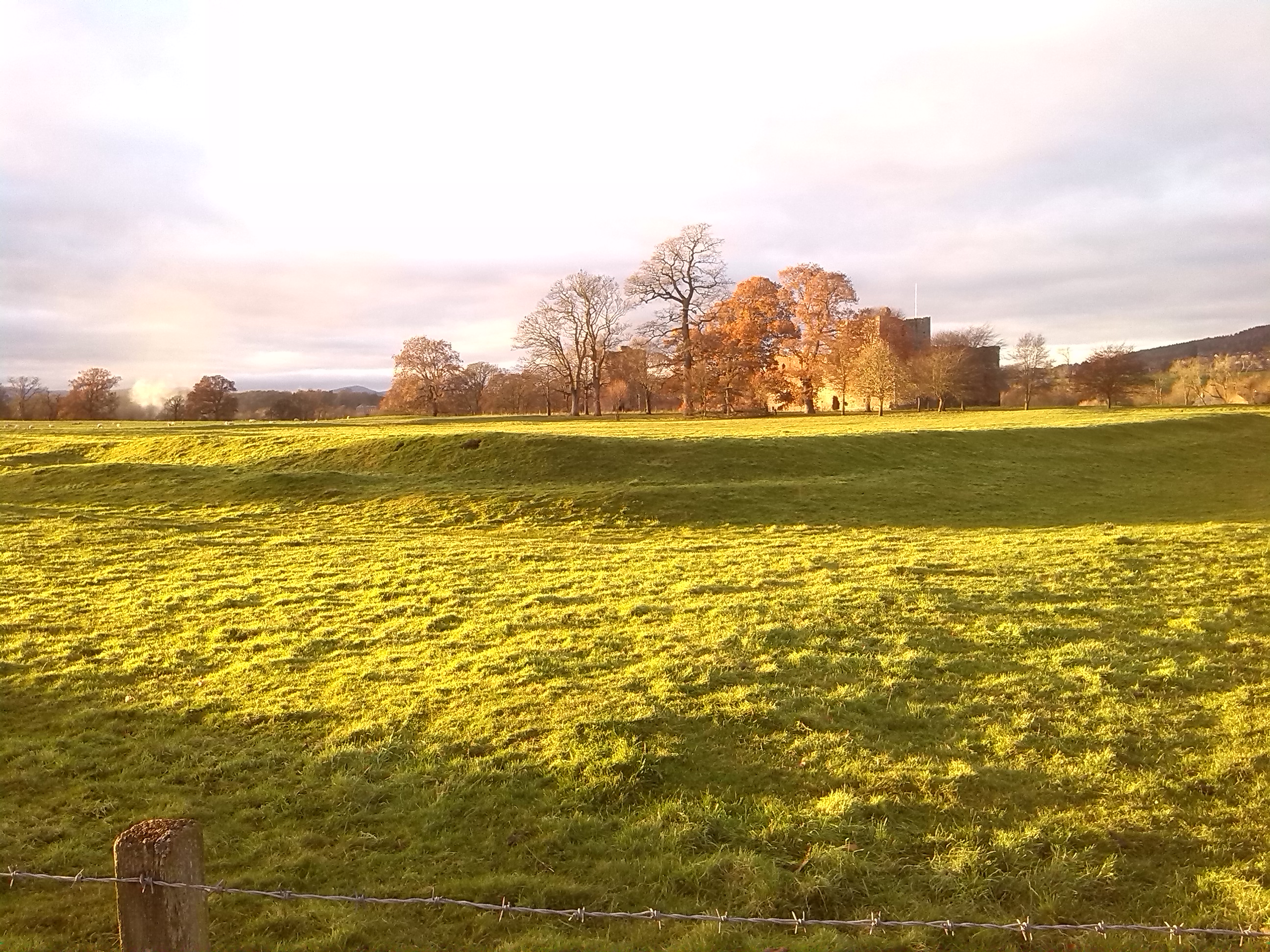
The banks of Brocavum Roman fort in the foreground; Brougham Castle is in the background

In a superstitious age, religion was a factor that may have helped to bridge the divide between Roman and Celtic ways of life to form a Romano-British culture. After the destruction of the Druids, there is evidence of a mixing of Roman mystery-cults with local Celtic deities, alongside formal Roman cults of the emperor and worship of the Olympian gods. For example, inscriptions to 'Mars Ocelus', a fusion of the Roman god of war with a local deity, have been found at Carlisle. An important collection of 'imperial cult' inscriptions survives at Maryport. A local deity, presumably of the Carvetii, wearing a gated crown, comes from Carlisle. A silver plaque, depicting the local deity Cocidius, has been found at Bewcastle, and the possibility that Brougham may have been linked with the god Belatucadrus has been suggested. There is some sketchy evidence of two non-Roman mystery cults, Mithraism and Christianity, in Roman Cumbria. A tombstone at Carlisle (of Flavius Antigonus Papias), and two others at Maryport and Brougham may have Christian significance. The local dialect word eglus, meaning a church, has survived from Roman times, having been incorporated into the Brythonic language from the Latin ecclesia, showing not only an acceptance of Roman culture among the locals, but also the introduction of Christianity to the region.

All in all, the old model of Roman 'conquerors' and local 'vanquished' in Cumbria and the north, is superseded by one that sees that, "within limits the local population became Romanised"

== Sources ==
- Breeze, D.J. (2004). "Roman military sites on the Cumbrian coast". In R.J.A. Wilson; I.D Caruana (eds.). Romans on the Solway : essays in honour of Richard Bellhouse. CWAAS Extra Series, vol.31. Kendal: Cumberland and Westmorland Antiquarian & Archaeological Society on behalf of the Trustees of the Senhouse Roman Museum, Maryport. pp. 1–231, p. 66–94. ISBN 978-1873124390.
- Breeze, David J. (2011). "The Roman military occupation of northern England". Transactions of the Cumberland and Westmorland Antiquarian and Archaeological Society. 3. 11: 113–136. doi:10.5284/1064017.
- Breeze, David J. (2012). "The Civitas stones and the building of Hadrian's Wall". Transactions of the Cumberland and Westmorland Antiquarian and Archaeological Society. 3. 12: 69–80. doi:10.5284/1063920.
- Caruana, I. D. (1997). "Maryport and the Flavian conquest of North Britain". In Wilson, R.J.A. (ed.). Roman Maryport and its setting : essays in memory of Michael G. Jarrett. CWAAS extra series, vol.28. [Carlisle]: Cumberland and Westmorland Antiquarian & Archaeological Society on behalf of the Trustees of the Senhouse Roman Museum, Maryport. pp. 1–168, p. 40–51. ISBN 978-1873124222.
- Higham, N.J. (1986). The Northern counties to AD 1000. A regional history of England. London: Longman. pp. xx, 1–392. ISBN 978-0582492769.
- Higham, N.J.; Jones, G.D.B. (1985). The Carvetii. Peoples of Roman Britain. Stroud: Alan Sutton. pp. xiii, 1–158. ISBN 978-0862990886.
- Hind, J.G.F. (1983). "Who betrayed Britain to the barbarians in AD 367?". Northern History. 19 (1). Leeds: Maney Publishing: 1–7. doi:10.1179/007817283790176509.
- Hogan, C. Michael (2007). "Hadrian's Wall, Misc. Earthwork in Northumberland". The Megalithic Portal. Megalithic.co.uk.
- Künzl, Ernst (2012). "Enamelled vessels of Roman Britain". In Breeze, David J. (ed.). The first souvenirs : enamelled vessels from Hadrian's Wall. CWAAS extra series, no.37. [Carlisle]: Cumberland and Westmorland Antiquarian and Archaeological Society. p. 136. ISBN 9781873124581.
- Shotter, David (September 2000). "Petillius Cerialis in northern Britain". Northern History. 36 (2). Leeds: Maney Publishing: 189–198. doi:10.1179/007817200790177879. S2CID 162371799.
- Shotter, David (2004). Romans and Britons in North-West England (3rd ed.). Lancaster: Centre for North-West Regional Studies, University of Lancaster. pp. xii, 204. ISBN 978-1862201521.
- Shotter, David (2014). "Roman Cumbria : Rome's "wild west"?". In Keith J. Stringer (ed.). North-West England from the Romans to the Tudors : essays in memory of John Macnair Todd. Extra series no. XLI. Carlisle: Cumberland and Westmorland Antiquarian and Archaeological Society. pp. xviii, 288, p.[1]–28. ISBN 9781873124659.
- Wilson, R.J.A. (2004). "Introduction : the Roman frontier on the Solway". In R.J.A. Wilson; I.D Caruana (eds.). Romans on the Solway : essays in honour of Richard Bellhouse. CWAAS Extra Series. Vol. 31. Kendal: Cumberland and Westmorland Antiquarian & Archaeological Society on behalf of the Trustees of the Senhouse Roman Museum, Maryport. pp. 1–231. ISBN 978-1873124390.
