= Mogons =

Ancient Celtic god of Roman Britain

Mogons (also Moguns, Mogontis and, in the plural, Moguntes; from a Celtic word meaning 'great') was an ancient Celtic god worshipped chiefly in the north of Roman Britain, in the military zone of Hadrian's Wall. His name is usually rendered 'the Great One'. It is known from a small group of Latin dedications, set up mainly by members of the frontier garrison, and from a handful of related divine names in Gaul and the Rhineland. On one altar from Netherby he is coupled with the native god Vitiris. Because the name occurs in many spellings and is sometimes invoked in the plural, several scholars have doubted whether it named a single deity. No classical author mentions him, and no image or interpretatio romana attaches to his cult, the evidence for him being wholly epigraphic and onomastic.

== Name ==
Mogons is named only in Latin inscriptions and in a few Gaulish theonyms, no Greek or Roman author recording him. In Britain the name is spelt in several ways, among them Mogons, Moguns and Mogontis, and, with loss of the g, Mounus, together with the plural forms Mountes and Moguntes.

The name Mogons is generally derived from the Celtic stem mago- or mogo-, and glossed 'the Great One'. Helmut Birkhan analysed it as an Indo-European nt-stem *mogont-s, cognate with Sanskrit mahānt and Avestan mazant ('great'). The underlying Gaulish root is mag- ('great'), which appears rounded to mog- before an initial m. Xavier Delamarre finds this rounding in the epithet Mogetius ('the powerful'), borne by Mars.

Birkhan related the name Mogons with a group of related divine names: Mars Mogetius, the goddess Mogontia, the mother-goddesses (Matres) Mogontiones, and Apollo Grannus Mogounus. The Rhineland town of Mogontiacum, now Mainz, carries the same element with a place-name suffix added. (Note: Birkhan noted that the by-name of Saint Patrick, recorded as Magonus or Mauonius in Muirchú's Life and in later hagiography, might belong with this group, or might instead derive from the Celtic word magu- ('slave, servant'). Delamarre glosses Gaulish magus as 'child, servant, valet', a word cognate with Old Irish mug and Gothic magus.)

== Cult ==
Mogons was worshipped in the north of Roman Britain, in the military districts on and behind Hadrian's Wall. Seven British dedications to him are known. Two come from Old Penrith (Voreda) in Cumbria, two from Risingham (Habitancum) and one from High Rochester (Bremenium) in Northumberland, one from Netherby (Castra Exploratorum) in Cumbria, and one from Vindolanda (Chesterholm). Anne Ross grouped Mogons with the other northern gods Cocidius, Belatucadros, Maponus and Vitiris, but noted that he was attested by fewer inscriptions, and from fewer places, than they.

The origin of the dedicators is unknown, and Colette Bémont observed that they present themselves as soldiers only twice, on the altars set up by a beneficiarius consularis at Risingham and by a decurion at High Rochester. Two of the Risingham altars were, by a tradition current in the time of William Camden, found in the river, and a local story told that the god Mogon had long defended the place against a pagan prince named Soldane.

Although the cult centred on Britain, related dedications carry the same name-element on the Continent. The goddess Mogontia was honoured at Metz (Divodurum) in Gallia Belgica, and Apollo Grannus Mogounus at Horburg in Germania Superior. The Matres Mogontiones are named on a dedication from Agonès in Gallia Narbonensis. Bémont also noted, with reserve, a possible occurrence of the name Mouno on two samian vessels from central Gaul, though she regarded the reading as uncertain.

== Interpretation ==
The relationship between the British god and his continental namesakes is disputed. Bémont held that the kinship of the names on either side of the Channel is beyond doubt, but that the identity of the gods they name is much less so. The British Mogons, she noted, is sometimes single and sometimes plural, a variation she wondered might be a plural of intensity, and he is known through no image and no interpretatio romana.

Opinion is divided over whether Mogons named a single deity. Because the name appears in so many forms and over so wide an area, James MacKillop and Miranda Green suggested that it was less a personal name than a title, one applicable to several gods such as Belatucadros or Cocidius. Kenneth Jackson thought that the forms Mogons and Mogunos might even represent two distinct gods.

On the altar from Netherby the god is coupled with the native deity Vitiris, as Mogons Vitiris. Ross treated Vitiris as here equated with the Celtic Mogons, and held that Vitiris was itself less an individual god than a god-type, a descriptive name meaning something like 'the Mighty One'. Green read the same pairing instead as a confusion and conflation of the two, while Birkhan took Mogons to be an epithet of Vitiris at Netherby and the god named at Old Penrith to be an independent deity. Both names are sometimes invoked in the plural: at High Rochester an altar is dedicated to the Moguntes.

The concentration of the British dedications in the frontier zone led Ian Richmond to suppose that the cult had been brought to Britain by Germanic soldiers, perhaps Vangiones. Bémont was sceptical. The clustering of dedications in the military zone is a general feature of the epigraphy and does not by itself prove importation, the dedicators appear as soldiers only twice, their origin is unknown, and there is no evidence that the cult was older in Germany than in Britain.

== Epigraphy ==
Mogons is named on seven British dedications, all from military sites of the northern frontier, and the same name-element occurs in dedications from Gaul and the Rhineland. Six of the British texts are given below, the seventh, from Vindolanda, being known only from its first publication, where the god is named Moguns.

Text	Find-spot	Divine name(s)	Translation	Reference	Comments
Deo Mog(on)ti	Old Penrith (Voreda), Cumbria	Mogons	To the god Mogons.	RIB 921	The theonym is carved MOGTI. On a red sandstone altar, now lost.
Deo Mo(g)unti [p]ro salu(t)e [...] sti v(otum) s(olvit) l(ibens) m(erito)	Old Penrith (Voreda), Cumbria	Moguns	To the god Moguns, for the welfare of [...], [...] fulfilled his vow willingly and deservedly.	RIB 922	Carved MOVNTI, read Mo(g)unti with loss of the g before u.
Deo Mogont(i) Vitire san(cto) Ael(ius) [Secund(us)] v(otum) s(olvit) l(ibens) m(erito)	Netherby (Castra Exploratorum), Cumbria	Mogons Vitiris	To the holy god Mogons Vitiris, Aelius Secundus fulfilled his vow willingly and deservedly.	RIB 971	Couples Mogons with Vitiris. On a red sandstone altar. The cognomen of the dedicant is restored.
[D]eo Mogonito Cad(...) et N(umini) d(omini) n(ostri) Aug(usti) M(arcus) G(avius) Secundinus [b(ene)]f(iciarius) co(n)s(ularis) Habitanci prima stat(ione) pro se et suis posu[it]	Risingham (Habitancum), Northumberland	Mogons Cad(...)	To the god Mogons Cad(...) and to the Divinity of our Lord the Augustus, Marcus Gavius Secundinus, beneficiarius consularis on his first tour of duty at Habitancum, set this up for himself and his household.	RIB 1225	Set up by a beneficiarius on the governor's staff. The epithet Cad(...) is unresolved. Richmond took it as a territorial epithet, perhaps a Germanic pagus-name. Found in the River Rede.
Deo Mo(g)uno Cad(...) Inventus do(no) [...] v(otum) s(olvit)	Risingham (Habitancum), Northumberland	Mogunus Cad(...)	To the god Mogunus Cad(...), Inventus, as a gift, [...] fulfilled his vow.	RIB 1226	A companion of the Risingham altar RIB 1225 above. Carved MOVNO, read Mo(g)uno. Also found in the River Rede, now lost.
Dis Mo(g)untibus Iul(ius) Firminus dec(urio) f(ecit)	High Rochester (Bremenium), Northumberland	the Moguntes	To the gods the Moguntes, Julius Firminus, decurion, made this.	RIB 1269	A plural form, carved MOVNTIBVS. The rank of decurion implies a cohors equitata at the fort.
Deae Mogontiae Iul(ius) Paternus tabellar(ius) ex voto	Metz (Divodurum), Gallia Belgica	Mogontia	To the goddess Mogontia, Julius Paternus, courier, in fulfilment of a vow.	CIL XIII, 4313	A feminine form of the name. The find-spot is the Sablon quarter of Metz.
Apollini Granno Mogouno aram Q(uintus) Licini(us) Trio d(e) s(uo) d(edit)	Horburg, Germania Superior	Apollo Grannus Mogounus	To Apollo Grannus Mogounus, Quintus Licinius Trio gave this altar from his own means.	CIL XIII, 5315	The name-element as an epithet of the healing god Apollo Grannus.
[M]ogontionibus Ocrac(ius) Fronto Ocraci f(ilius) posuit	Agonès, Gallia Narbonensis	the Mogontiones	To the Mogontiones, Ocracius Fronto, son of Ocracus, set this up.	AE 1986, 471	A plural dedication, interpreted by Birkhan as the mother-goddesses (Matres) Mogontiones.
