= Gallo-Roman religion =

Fusion of religions of Gaul and ancient Rome

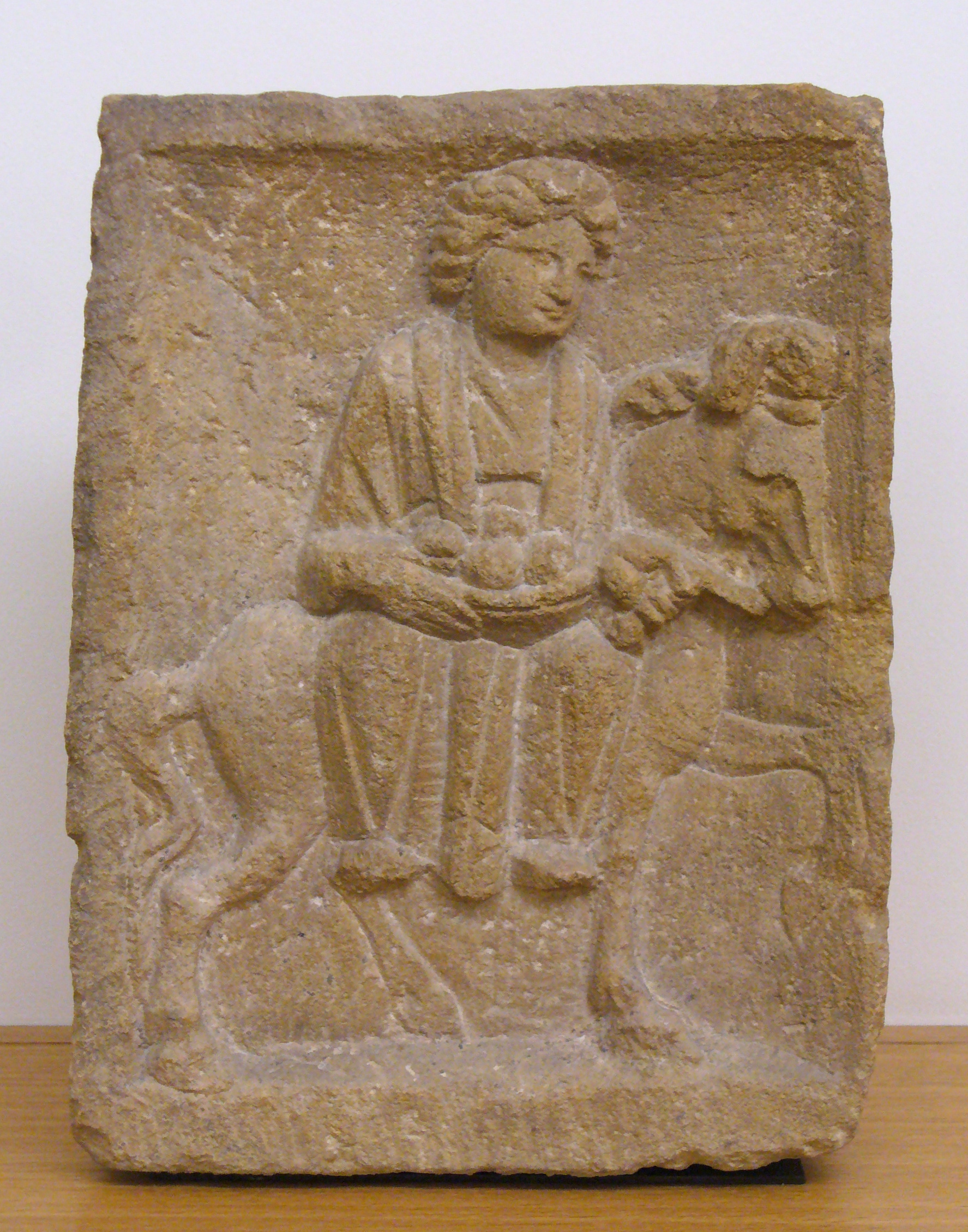
Epona from Dalheim Ricciacum

Gallo-Roman religion is a fusion of the traditional religious practices of the Gauls, who were originally Gaulish language speakers, and the Roman and Hellenistic religions introduced to the region under Roman Imperial rule. It was the result of selective acculturation.

== Deities ==
In some cases, Gaulish deity names were used as epithets for Roman deities, and vice versa, as with Lenus Mars or Jupiter Poeninus. In other cases, Roman gods were given Gaulish female partners – for example, Mercury was paired with Rosmerta and Sirona was partnered with Apollo. In at least one case – that of the equine goddess Epona – a native Celtic goddess was also adopted by Romans. Mother goddesses, who were probably fertility deities, retained their importance in Gallo-Roman religion; their cults were spread throughout Gaul. Epigraphic evidence suggests a triad of mother goddesses was particularly important in Gallo-Roman society.

The Jupiter Column was a distinctive type of religious monument from Roman Gaul and Germania, combining an equestrian Jupiter overcoming a giant (or sometimes Jupiter enthroned) with panels depicting many other deities.

Eastern mystery religions penetrated Gaul early on. These included the cults of Orpheus, Mithras, Cybele, and Isis. The imperial cult, centered primarily on the numen of Augustus, came to play a prominent role in the public religion of Gaul, most dramatically at the Sanctuary of the Three Gauls at Lugdunum.

The Celtic Sulis, a water deity, was merged with Minerva, a wisdom deity. Their merger was so comprehensive that the terms Minerva and Sulis were interchangeable in Gallo-Roman religion. Minerva was never viewed as a water deity, however her wisdom connotations lent her some worship as a goddess of medicine. This attribute mixed with the water associations of Sulis to grant Minerva a role presiding over the Aquae Sulis, a hot spring believed to have healing attributes. Many votive dedications to Sulis Minerva have been found located near springs throughout Gaul. One such offering found near Auxerre depicts Minerva next to a Gallic goddess, possibly Ritona. Other healing deities worshipped by the Gauls, Glanis and the Glanicae, were merged with the Roman goddess Valetudo. Cobannus may have come to be worshipped with Romanized practices as well. His temples were possibly associated with local theatres and ceremonial games. Such theatres contained sacred images and busts used in ritual sacrifices. Furthermore, some Gallo-Roman sanctuaries may have contained Roman baths or spas used in healing rituals. One example of these sacred baths is the sanctuary of Mars Lenus in Trier. Although Mars was a war god in the Roman pantheon, he acquired connotations as a medical deity in Gallo-Roman religion.

Some Celtic deities were never fully assimilated into Roman religion. Gallo-Roman artwork often depicts the Celtic god Cernunnos, an antlered deity frequently portrayed sitting cross-legged. This deity was likely never given an interpretatio Romana possibly because he was too distinct from the Roman pantheon to syncretize. Roman writers did attempt to compare him to Roman deities such as Mercury, Jupiter, Actaeon, and Dis Pater. Several Pre-Roman Celtic gods continued to be worshipped after the Roman conquest without complete assimilation into Roman religion. Deities such as Epona or Cobannus retained significant followings under Roman rule. The Gallic deity Cocidius accrued a following among soldiers in the Roman military. His name is mentioned in twenty-five inscriptions; five of which equate him with Mars, one equates him with Silvanus, and another with the god Vernostonos.

== Practices ==
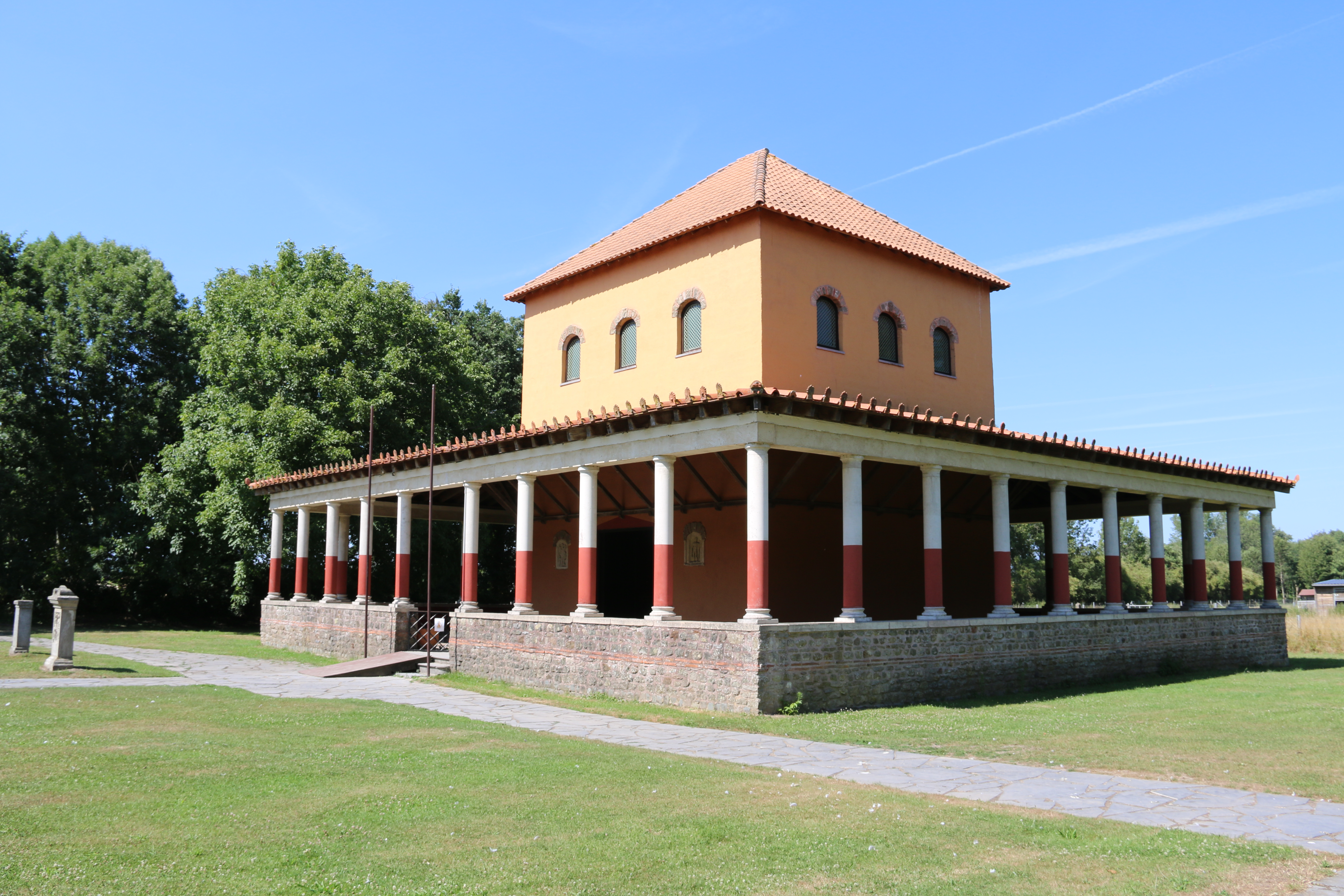
Reconstruction of a Gallo-Roman temple at Aubechies.

During the process of syncretization Celtic and Roman practices influenced each other. Roman religious practices such as offerings of incense and animal sacrifice, dedicatory inscriptions, and naturalistic statuary depicting deities in anthropomorphic form were combined with specific Gaulish practices such as circumambulation around a temple.

Emperor Augustus banned the druids, an important priestly class in pre-Roman Gaul. Tiberius, the successor of Augustus, continued these policies, outlawing vates and healers. Instead of druidism, Gallo-Roman priests adopted more Roman styles of religious leadership. Celtic sites likely lost their value since the pre-Roman social hierarchies of Gaul also vanished, thereby diminishing the importance of religious sites associated with those hierarchies. Local elites may have been further compelled to associate themselves with the Roman elites to maintain or advance their position within the new social hierarchy. Expressions of Romanized culture aided this process by demonstrating their newfound Romanitas, or identity as Romans. Latin became the standard language of Gallo-Roman religion. The Roman government possibly contributed to the Romanization process by providing formal structures for the emerging Gallo-Roman religion to operate within. Drusus, the son of Emperor Tiberius, established a cult center near Lyon and local Roman magistrates supervised religious functions.

=== Temples ===
A characteristic Gallo-Roman temple or fanum is identifiable in archaeology from its concentric shape. Celtic religious views on water likely also influenced Gallo-Roman temple design. Many Gallo-Roman temples are located nearby sources of water, likely stemming from the importance of water in Celtic religion. Gallo-Roman temples were often quadrangular, usually square-shaped, less commonly rectangular; sometimes, although infrequently, they were circular or polygonal. Gallo-Roman temples were constructed with imperishable materials such as tiles or stone; they often featured Romanized artistic embellishments such as painted wall plaster or columns. Many Gallo-Roman temples featured various combinations of these characteristics such as an externally polygonal but internally circular cella or a hexagonal cella and a quadrangular ambulatory. There are rare examples of twin temples surround by an ambulatory gallery. Unlike Classical Roman temples, the entrances of Gallo-Roman temples are typically oriented eastward. Most exceptions to this practice likely resulted from topographic issues preventing a different orientation. This practice may have been connected to circambulation; the majority of temples which do not obey this orientation lack ambulatories.

Earlier Celtic religion had less emphasis on structured monuments and temples. Romanization led to the construction of more temples and the redesign of preexisting sites to more closely resemble Greco-Roman architecture. The temple at Gournay-Sur-Aronde was once a pre-Roman Celtic site. During this phase, it consisted of a central ditch enclosed by nine free-standing posts. This site was likely an open-air environment used for sacrifices. After Romanization, the site was rebuilt around a central cella with cob walls on a stone foundation. It was surrounded by a wooden ambulatory, and it retained the central pit. Numerous other Celtic sites throughout Gaul and Britain demonstrate a similar architectural transformation. Many Gallo-Roman temples were constructed upon the ruins of earlier Celtic religious sites. The newer temples often retained the original layout and shape of the Celtic structures, however, their building materials and physical appearance changed to better resemble Roman architecture. Similarities between Gallo-Roman and Celtic architecture possibly made the new religion more palatable for the local populace. The Romanization of Gallic religious architecture was a slow process; there are only a small number of examples of Classical-style temples entirely replacing preexisting Celtic temples. However, by the 1st century CE, Gallo-Roman styles had been largely replaced by Classical architecture.

=== Votive offerings ===
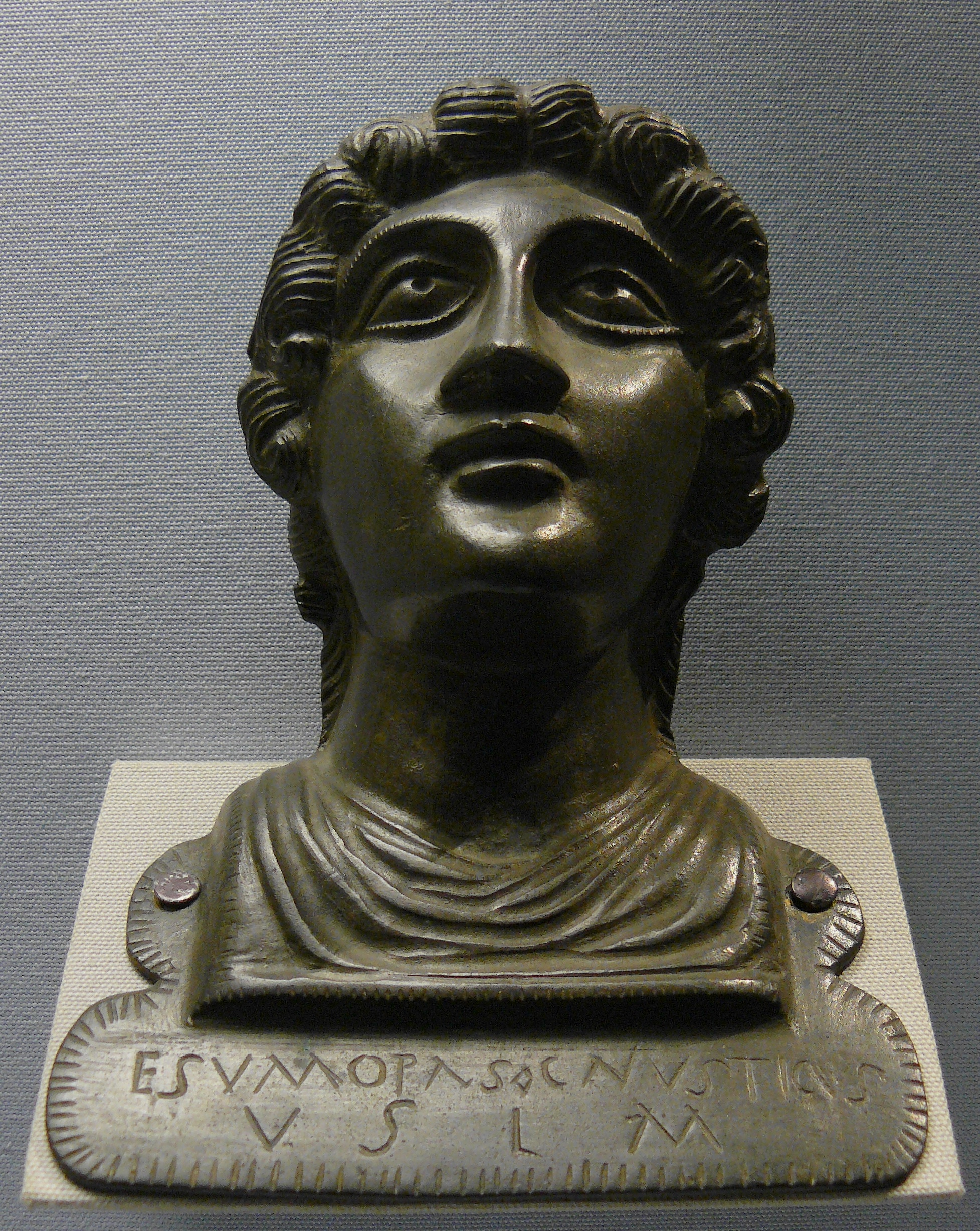
A votive offering to an unnamed deity

Gallo-Roman inscriptions detailing vota are typically private offerings; public votive offerings from priests, military officers, or magistrates are much rarer in Gaul than in other parts of the empire. These votive practices were likely reserved for special circumstances rather than ritualistic public vows. In Roman Gaul, most votive inscriptions were recorded using inscribed metal plates announcing the vows or votive monuments commemorating the dedication. It is possible that many vows were also written and sealed on tablets and stored in bronze boxes. Altar stones, including sacrificial altars, were among the most common types of votive monuments in the northwestern provinces of the Roman Empire, including Germania. These altars contained iconography depicting religious practices such as ritual sacrifices or sacrificial equipment. Altars found in Lower Germany are usually constructed of a plinth with an entablature; sometimes they had an aediculum depicting the god honored by the altar. Physical representations of votive offerings were often displayed publicly in sanctuaries. These public displays likely served to highlight the social status of the individual responsible for the offering. Altars from the Rhineland are typically made from local varieties of sandstone. However, some are made from the more expensive, and higher quality, Northern French limestone. It is possible that this difference in materials was intended to demonstrate social status and wealth. Individuals who could afford the higher quality stone utilized their wealth to create a more permanent marker of their piety contrasted with the less extravagant votive offerings.

Weapons were used as votive offerings to war deities in pre-Roman Gaul. This practice possibly continued during Roman rule; weapon deposits have been unearthed in Gallo-Roman temples. However, these deposits have also been found in areas that did not practice the tradition before the Roman conquest. Indicating that these weapon offerings may not have been a substitute or continuation of the Celtic tradition.

=== Sacrifice ===
The Roman Emperor Claudius prohibited the practice of human sacrifice in Gaul. Roman policies may not have affected the rates of human sacrifice in Gaul; the practice may have already dissipated. These laws may have served as pro-Roman propaganda meant to illustrate the moral and cultural superiority of their society. Instead of human sacrifice, the population may have adopted similar, Romanized substitutes. Pomponius Mela describes a Gallo-Roman practice in which sacrificial victims have their blood drawn as they are led to the altar, rather than a true human sacrifice. Archaeological excavations in Belgic Gaul uncovered the ruins of a man, a woman, and a child in an ancient well. These skeletons may have been part of a human sacrifice, possibly to stimulate the utility of the well. Such evidence indicates that human sacrifice may have been practiced in Gaul, and possibly continued after the Roman occupation. Celtic practices of animal sacrifice likely remained unchanged after the Roman conquest.

Furthermore, the Romans likely did not end the practice of headhunting in Gaul, as Strabo claims. One funerary stele from Kollmoor depicts a Roman auxiliary cavalryman stamping on the head of a defeated Suebian warrior. Another relief from Paris depicts severed heads hanging from trees and a votive offering on a frieze from Arles depicts votive offerings of severed heads. It is possible that headhunting had become a more accepted practice within the Roman military due to the influence of Gallic culture. Artwork from Trajan's Column depicts severed heads impaled on spikes near the Roman encampments and Roman auxiliaries, many of whom were Gallic, carrying severed heads on their spears.

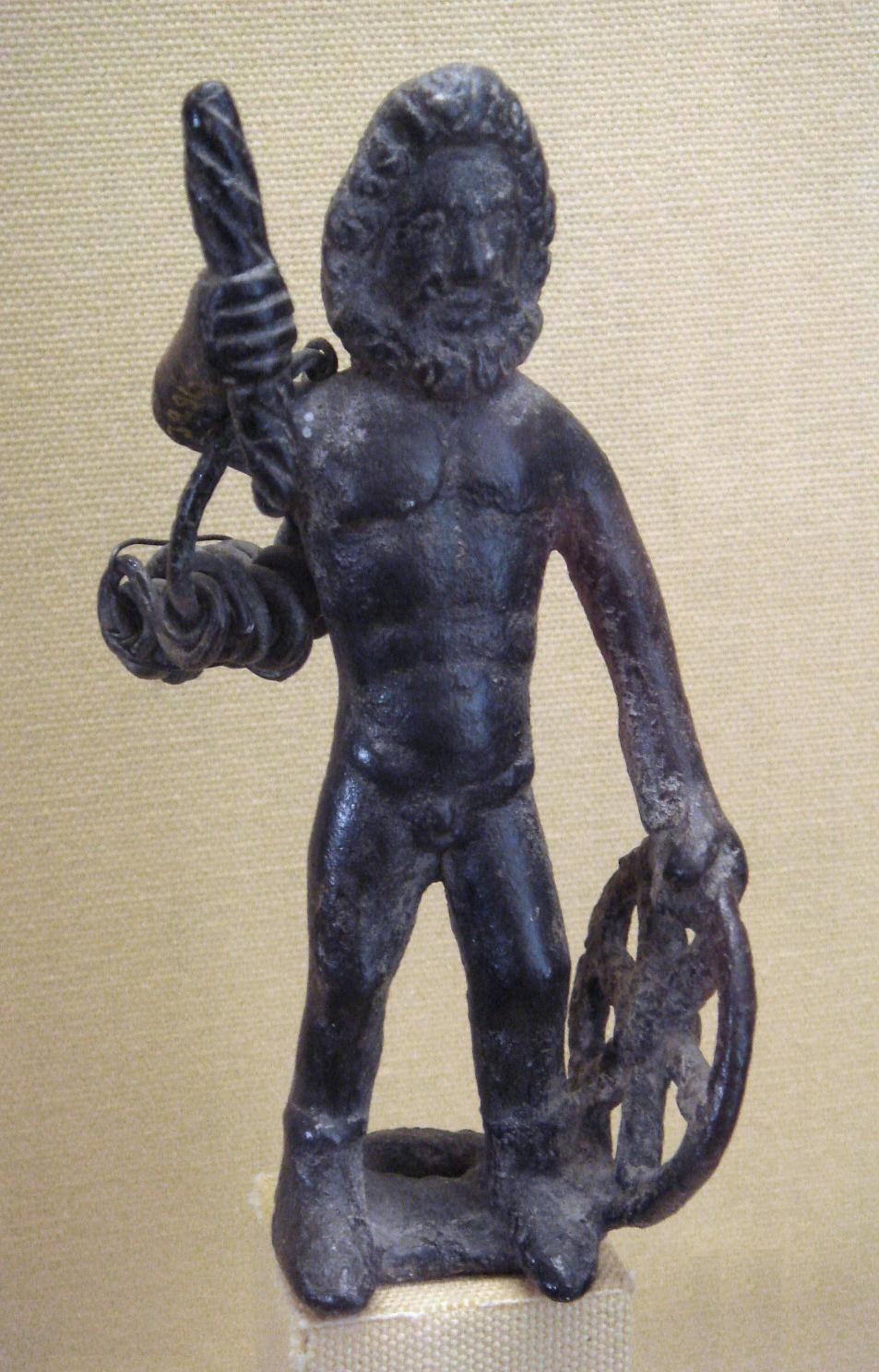
Statue of Jupiter from Haute-Mare

=== Symbolism ===
Pre-Roman Celtic depictions of deities mixed with Roman art styles to form unique Gallo-Roman art. Gallo-Roman depictions of Mercury often contain numerous features more closely resembling Celtic deities rather than standard Roman depictions of Mercury. One statue found near Lezoux depicts a bearded, elderly Mercury dressed in a tunic and breeches wearing a petasos and carrying a purse and a caduceus. The statue depicts Mercury accompanied by a goat and a rooster. Another statue of Mercury found near Néris also depicts the deity with the same purse. This statue further portrays him holding a ram-headed serpent and accompanied by a Gallic goddess, possibly Rosmerta. Similarly, Celtic depictions of Jupiter differ significantly from their more standard Roman counterparts. One bronze statuette from Haute-Marne depicts Jupiter holding a thunderbolt in his raised right hand and a six-spoked wheel in his left. The right shoulder of the statue is suspended by nine bronze spirals. In Celtic religion, spirals and wheels were symbols of the god Taranis and other sky deities.

Divine consorts, pairs of male and female deities, are a common theme in Gallo-Roman art; this emphasis on divine pairs originates from Celtic religion. Gallo-Roman divine consorts always consist of a female Celtic deity and a male of either Celtic or Roman origin. These pairings may have served to symbolically represent the union of Gallic and Roman religion, legitimizing Roman deities by inserting them into the Gallic pantheon. Roman deities such as Mercury or Apollo were paired with differing goddesses depending upon their epithet. Mars Lenus was paired with Ancamna while Mars Loucetius was paired with Nemetona. This practice likely functioned to legitimize the Roman deities in their differing worship capacities. By the 1st century CE, Romanized art styles had largely supplanted Gallo-Roman styles.

== See also ==
- Roman Gaul
- Gallo-Roman culture
- Interpretatio romana
- Romano-Celtic temple
- Celtic mythology

== Sources ==
- Burnand, Y. (1999). "Notes sur le vocabulaire épigraphique de la représentation de la divinité en Gaule romaine" in Signa deorum : L'iconographie divine en Gaule romaine. Communications présentées au colloque organisé par le Centre Albert Grenier d'antiquité nationale de l'Université de Nancy II et la direction d'études d'antiquités de la Gaule romaine de la IVe section de l'École pratique des hautes études. Y. Burnand and H. Lavagne. Paris, De Boccard (in French).
- Debal, J. (1983) "Vienne-en-Val, divinités et sanctuaires." Bulletin de la Société Archéologique et Historique de l'Orléanais, 42 (in French).
- Deyts, S. (1998). À la rencontre des Dieux gaulois, un défi à César. Paris: Réunion des Musées Nationaux (in French).
- Faudet, I. (1993) Les temples de tradition celtique en Gaule Romaine. Paris, Éditions Errance. ISBN 2-87772-074-8 (in French).
- Green, M. (1986) Gods of the Celts. Stroud: Sutton Publishing Limited. ISBN 0-7509-1581-1.
- Jufer, N.; Luginbühl, T. (2001) Répertoire des dieux gaulois. Paris, Éditions Errance. ISBN 2-87772-200-7 (in French).
- Weisgerber, G. (1975). Das Pilgerheiligtum des Apollo und der Sirona von Hochscheid im Hunsruck. Bonn: Rudolf Habelt Press (in German).
- Woolf, G. (1998). Becoming Roman: the origins of provincial civilization in Gaul. Cambridge: Cambridge University Press.
