= Vinotonus =

God in Celtic mythology

Vinotonus is a god from Celtic mythology of which little is known. Only four altars dedicated to Vinotonus have been found all of which are located near the Roman fort at Bowes. The ancient Romans found Vinotonus to be equivalent to Silvanus, the god of agriculture, and that he was a wilderness god. It was common for the Romans to assign the names of popular Roman gods to local Celtic deities as Silvanus was also equated with the Celtic god Cocidius.

== Sources ==
- Dorcey, Peter F. (1992). The Cult of Silvanus: A Study in Roman Folk Religion. Leiden: E.J. Brill. ISBN 9789004096011.
