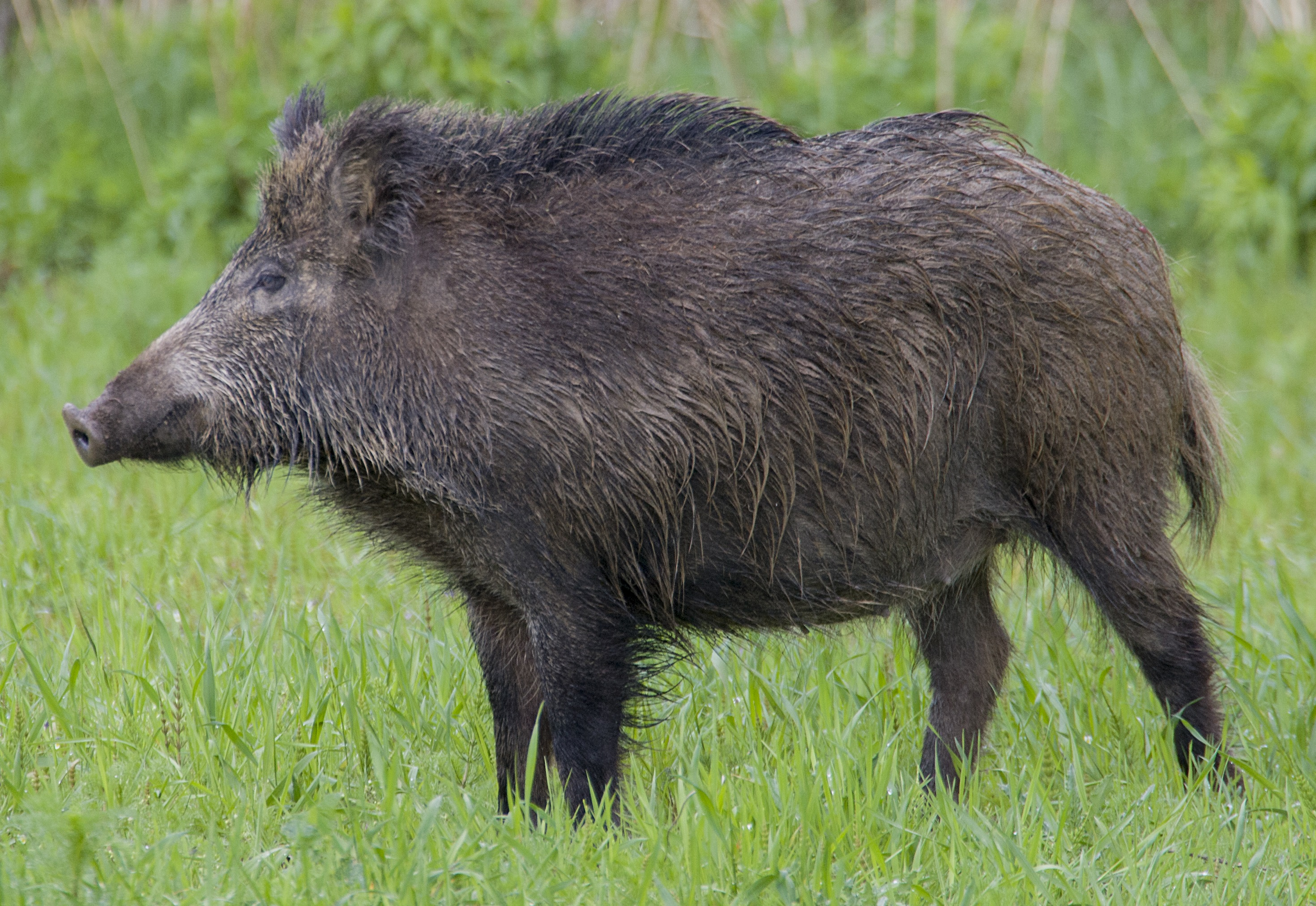
- S. s. scrofa, Poland

Scientific classification
- Kingdom: Animalia
- Phylum: Chordata
- Class: Mammalia
- Order: Artiodactyla
- Family: Suidae
- Genus: Sus
- Species: S. scrofa
- Subspecies: S. s. scrofa

Trinomial name
- Sus scrofa scrofa Linnaeus, 1758

Synonyms
- Species synonymy: anglicus (Reichenbach, 1846); aper (Erxleben, 1777); asiaticus (Sanson, 1878); bavaricus (Reichenbach, 1846); campanogallicus (Reichenbach, 1846); capensis (Reichenbach, 1846); castilianus (Thomas, 1911); celticus (Sanson, 1878); chinensis (Linnaeus, 1758); crispus (Fitzinger, 1858); deliciosus (Reichenbach, 1846); domesticus (Erxleben, 1777); europaeus (Pallas, 1811); fasciatus (von Schreber, 1790); ferox (Moore, 1870); ferus (Gmelin, 1788); gambianus (Gray, 1847); hispidus (von Schreber, 1790); hungaricus (Reichenbach, 1846); ibericus (Sanson, 1878); italicus (Reichenbach, 1846); juticus (Fitzinger, 1858); lusitanicus (Reichenbach, 1846); macrotis (Fitzinger, 1858); monungulus (G. Fischer [von Waldheim], 1814); moravicus (Reichenbach, 1846); nanus (Nehring, 1884); palustris (Rütimeyer, 1862); pliciceps (Gray, 1862); polonicus (Reichenbach, 1846); sardous (Reichenbach, 1846); scropha (Gray, 1827); sennaarensis (Fitzinger, 1858); sennaarensis (Gray, 1868); sennaariensis (Fitzinger, 1860); setosus (Boddaert, 1785); siamensis (von Schreber, 1790); sinensis (Erxleben, 1777); suevicus (Reichenbach, 1846); syrmiensis (Reichenbach, 1846); turcicus (Reichenbach, 1846); variegatus (Reichenbach, 1846); vulgaris (S. D. W., 1836); wittei (Reichenbach, 1846)

= Central European boar =

Subspecies of wild boar

The Central European boar (Sus scrofa scrofa) is a subspecies of wild boar, currently distributed across almost all of mainland Europe, with the exception of some northern areas in both Norway and Northern Sweden and European Russia and the southernmost parts of Greece. It is a medium-sized, dark to rusty-brown haired subspecies with long and relatively narrow lacrimal bones. In Northern Italy, artificially introduced S. s. scrofa have extensively interbred with the smaller sized indigenous S. s. majori populations since the 1950s.

The boar features prominently in early-Medieval Germanic cultures, with its image having been frequently engraved on shields and swords. They also feature on Germanic boar helmets, such as the Benty Grange helmet, where it was believed to offer protection to the wearer and has been theorised to have been used in spiritual transformations into swine, similar to berserkers. The boar features heavily in religious practice in Germanic paganism where it is closely associated with Freyr and has also been suggested to have been a totemic animal to the Swedes, especially to the Yngling royal dynasty who claimed descent from the god.

According to Tacitus, the Baltic Aesti featured boars on their helmets, and may have also worn boar masks. The boar and pig were held in particularly high esteem by the Celts, who considered them to be their most important sacred animal. Some Celtic deities linked to boars include Moccus and Veteris. It has been suggested that some early myths surrounding the Welsh hero Culhwch involved the character being the son of a boar god. Nevertheless, the importance of the boar as a culinary item among Celtic tribes may have been exaggerated in popular culture by the Asterix series, as wild boar bones are rare among Celtic archaeological sites, and the few that occur show no signs of butchery, having probably been used in sacrificial rituals.
