= Veteris =

Celtic god

Veteris (commonly spelled Vitiris, Vheteris, Huetiris, and Hueteris) was a Celtic god attested from many inscriptions in Roman Britain. The dedicants were usually private individuals and were exclusively male. During the 3rd Century AD the cult was particularly popular among the ranks of the Roman army.

Veteris' name was never linked with that of any of the Classical gods, but he was invoked with another local god, Mogons, at Netherby.

== Centres of worship ==
Veteris was worshipped in Roman Britain and altar-stones raised to him have been recovered in the United Kingdom, such as those excavated at:

- Netherby (971 [Mogont Vitire], 973 [Huetiri])
- Carrawburgh (1548 [Veteri], 1549 [Huiteribus])
- Housesteads (1602 [Hueteri], 1603 [Huitri], 1604-7 [Veteribus])
- Hadrian's Wall (2068 [Veteri], 2096 [Huiteribus])
- Catterick (727)
- Chester-le-Street (1046 [Vitiri], 1047 [Vitiribus], 1048 [Vitbus])
- South Shields (1070c [Ansu Vitiri])
- Lanchester (1087, 1088)
- Ebchester (1103 & 1104 [Vitiri])
- Corbridge (1139 [Veteri], 1140 [Vitiri], 1141 [Vit])
- Benwell (1335 [Vetri], 1336 [Vitirbus])
- Chesters (1455 [Vitiri], 1456 [Veteribus], 1457 [Vitirbus], 1458 [Votris?])
- Great Chesters (1728 [Vetiri], 1729 & 1730 [Veteribus])
- Chesterholm (1697 [Veteri], 1698 [Veteri], 1699 [Veteribus], 1722e & 1722f [Veteribus])
- Carvoran (1793-5 [Veteri], 1796 [Vetiri], 1797 [Vetiriu], 1798 [Viterino], 1799-1801 [Vitiri], 1802/3 [Veteribus], 1804 [Viteribus], 1805 [Vitiribus])

Forty altars to this god are recorded altogether, some alluding to Veteris as a single entity, others to a multiple version, perhaps a triad. Little is known about the specific function or character of the god. Occasionally, there is iconography associated with Veteris: for example, an altar from Carvoran is decorated with images of a boar and snake, the boar indicative of hunting or war and the snake healing or death.

== Sources ==
- British Museum, London, England.
- Lancaster museum, Lancaster, England.
- Newcastle Museum of Antiquities, Newcastle, England.
- Penrith Museum, Penrith, England.
- Verovicium Roman Museum, Housesteads Fort, Northumberland, England.
- York Castle Museum, York, England.
- Dictionary of Celtic Myth and Legend, Miranda J. Green, Thames and Hudson Ltd, 1997
