= Richard von Kienle =

German philologist

- Born: 9 February 1908; Freiburg, Germany
- Died: 18 May 1985 (aged 77); Berlin, Germany

Academic background
- Education: University of Heidelberg
- Doctoral advisor: Hermann Güntert

Academic work
- Discipline: Linguistics
- Sub-discipline: Germanic studies; Indo-European linguistics
- Institutions: University of Heidelberg; University of Jena; University of Hamburg; Free University of Berlin

Richard von Kienle (9 February 1908 – 18 May 1985) was a German linguist who specialized in Germanic and Indo-European linguistics.

== Biography ==
Richard von Kienle was born in Freiburg, Germany on 9 February 1908. He gained his Ph.D. at the University of Heidelberg in 1931 under the supervision of Hermann Güntert. von Kienle subsequently served as an assistant at the Deutsches Rechtswörterbuch under Eberhard von Künßberg. Since the summer of 1938 he was an acting professor at the University of Heidelberg, having stepped in for Güntert, who was in poor health at the time. He was later an acting professor at the University of Jena under Walter Porzig. Since 1940 he was an associate professor at the University of Heidelberg.

In 1941, von Kienle was appointed a professor at the University of Hamburg. He served as a soldier in the Wehrmacht from 1942 to 1945 during World War II. He was recruited into the Ahnenerbe by Walter Wüst, and conducted research on Indo-European linguistics and Germanic studies. Along with Wüst, von Kienle was an editor of the journal Wörter und Sachen, which had been founded by Güntert. Due to his membership in the Nazi Party and service in the SS, von Kienle was fired from the University of Hamburg after World War II, and subsequently worked as a school teacher in Heidelberg. From 1953 to 1974, von Kienle was Professor of Indo-European Linguistics at the Free University of Berlin. He died in Berlin on 18 May 1985.

== Selected works ==
- Germanische Gemeinschaftsformen, Berlin: Das Ahnenerbe, Stuttgart: Kohlhammer, 1939
- Gotische Texte, Heidelberg 1948
- Fremdwörterlexikon, Heidelberg 1950, 10. Auflage 1965
- mit Hans Haas: Lateinisch-deutsches Wörterbuch. Mit einer Einleitung über Sprachgeschichte, Lautgeschichte, Formenlehre und Wortbildungslehre von Richard v. Kienle, Heidelberg: F. H. Kerle 1952
- Historische Laut- und Formenlehre des Deutschen, Tübingen 1960, 2. Auflage 1969

== See also ==
- Franz Rolf Schröder
- Franz Altheim

== Sources ==
- Matthias Fritz: Indogermanistik an der Freien Universität Berlin, in: Karol Kubicki, Siegward Lönnendonker (Hrsg.), Die Altertums- und Kunstwissenschaften an der Freien Universität Berlin, V & R unipress, Göttingen 2015, S. 52ff
