= Old Carlisle =

Settlement in Cumbria, England

Coordinates: 54.807393°N 03.153300°W

- Settlement
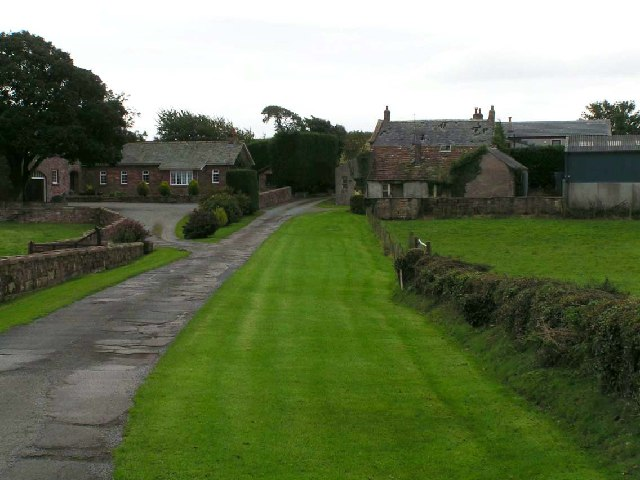
- Mire Cottage and Croft House, Old Carlisle

- Location in the former Allerdale Borough Location within Cumbria
- OS grid reference: NY2646
- Civil parish: Westward
- Unitary authority: Cumberland
- Ceremonial county: Cumbria
- Region: North West
- Country: England
- Sovereign state: United Kingdom
- Post town: WIGTON
- Postcode district: CA7
- Dialling code: 016973
- Police: Cumbria
- Fire: Cumbria
- Ambulance: North West
- UK Parliament: Penrith and Solway

Old Carlisle is a settlement in the civil parish of Westward in the Cumberland unitary authority area of Cumbria, England. It is located by the Wiza Beck, and was originally a part of Cumberland before the reorganisation of local government in 1974.

== Roman fort ==
During the Roman times, Old Carlisle was home to a Roman fort. It has been dated back to the 2nd century AD, and was destroyed and rebuilt in 296 AD.

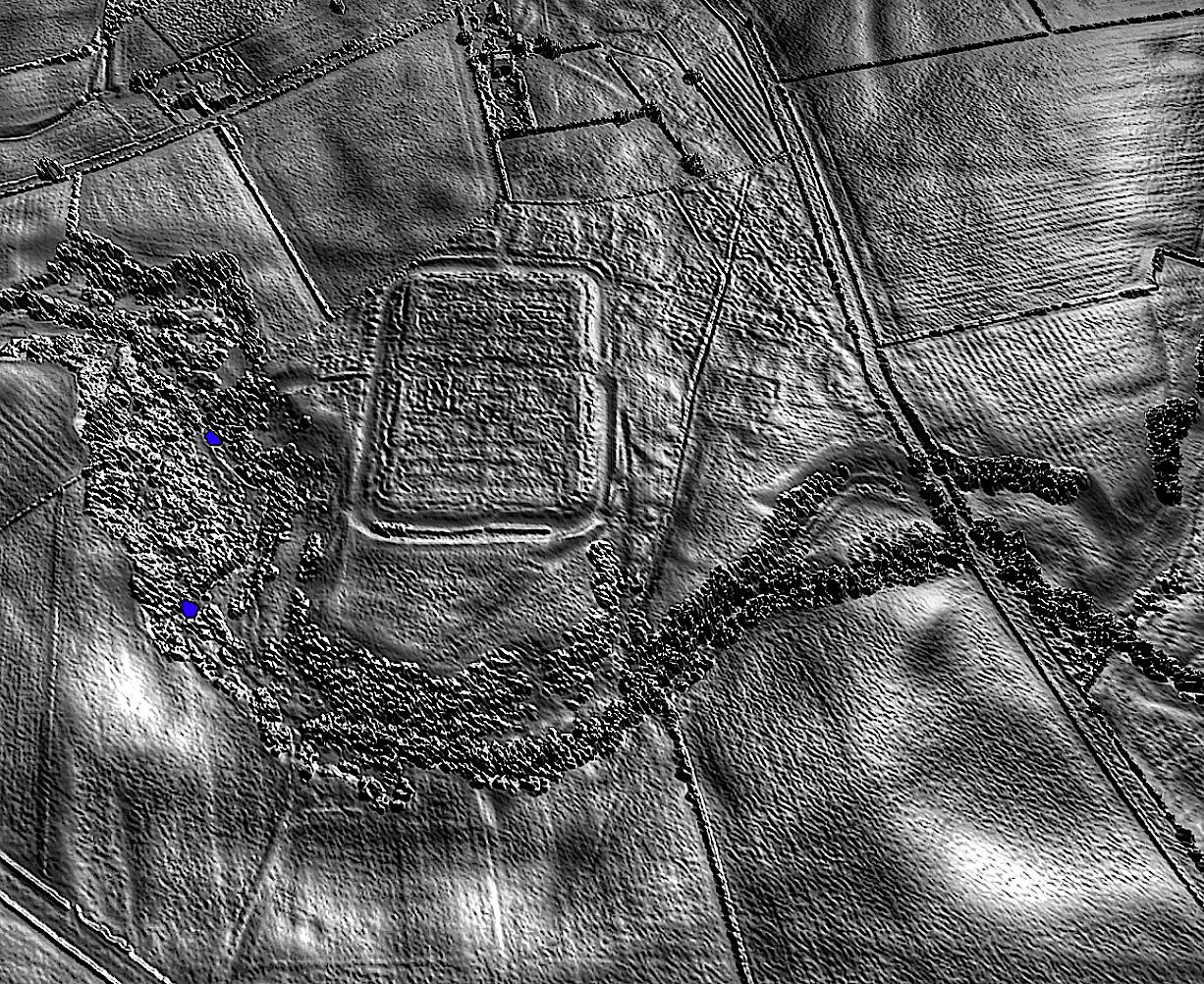
A lidar view of Old Carlisle Roman fort and vicus .
