= Agonès =

- Commune
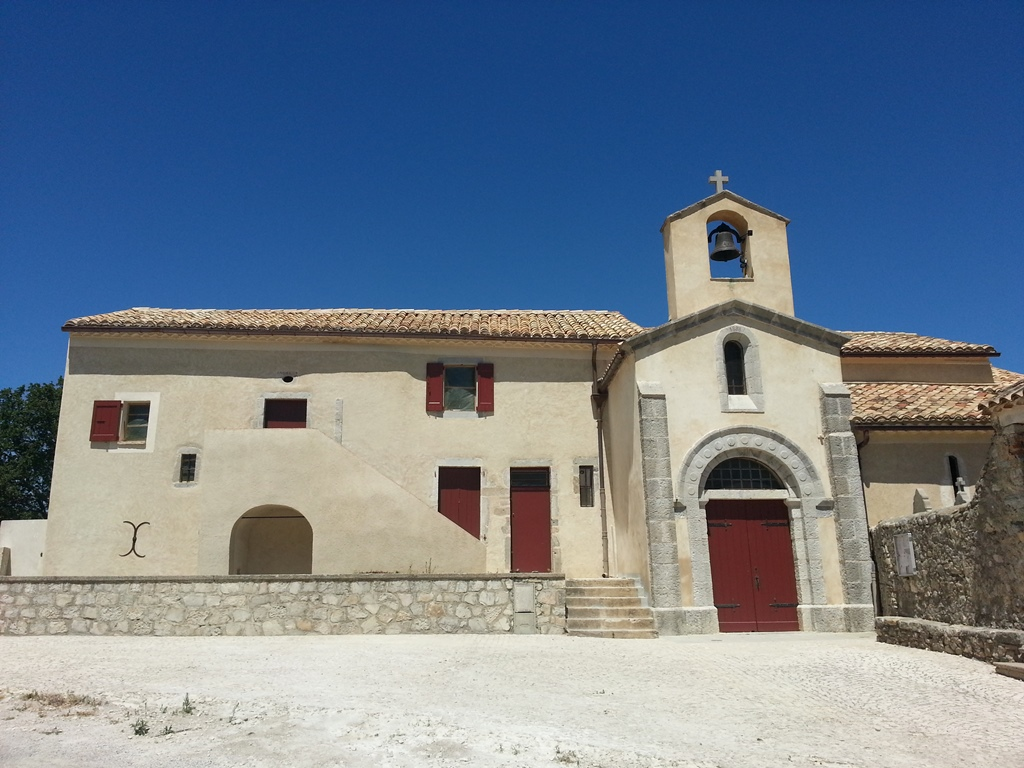
- Church of Saint Saturnin

- Coat of arms
- Location of Agonès
- Location within France Location within Occitanie
- Coordinates: 43°54′12″N 3°43′45″E
- Country: France
- Region: Occitania
- Department: Hérault
- Arrondissement: Lodève
- Canton: Lodève
- Intercommunality: Cévennes Gangeoises et Suménoises

Government
  - Mayor (2020–2026): Patrick Tricou
- Area^{1}: 4.16 km^{2} (1.61 sq mi)
- Elevation: 150 m (490 ft)
- Highest elevation: 323 m (1,060 ft)
- Lowest elevation: 119 m (390 ft)
- Population (2023): 319
  - Density: 76.7/km^{2} (199/sq mi)
- Time zone: UTC+01:00 (CET)
  - Summer (DST): UTC+02:00 (CEST)
- INSEE/Postal code: 34005 /34190
- ^{1} French Land Register data, which excludes lakes, ponds, glaciers > 1 km^{2} (0.386 sq mi or 247 acres) and river estuaries.

Agonès (French pronunciation: [aɡɔnɛs]; Occitan: Agonés) is a commune in the Hérault department in the Occitanie region in southern France.

== Population ==
Historical population
Year	Pop.	±% p.a.
1968	68	—
1975	77	+1.79%
1982	99	+3.66%
1990	131	+3.56%
1999	179	+3.53%
2007	228	+3.07%
2012	240	+1.03%
2017	265	+2.00%
2023	319	+3.14%
Source: INSEE

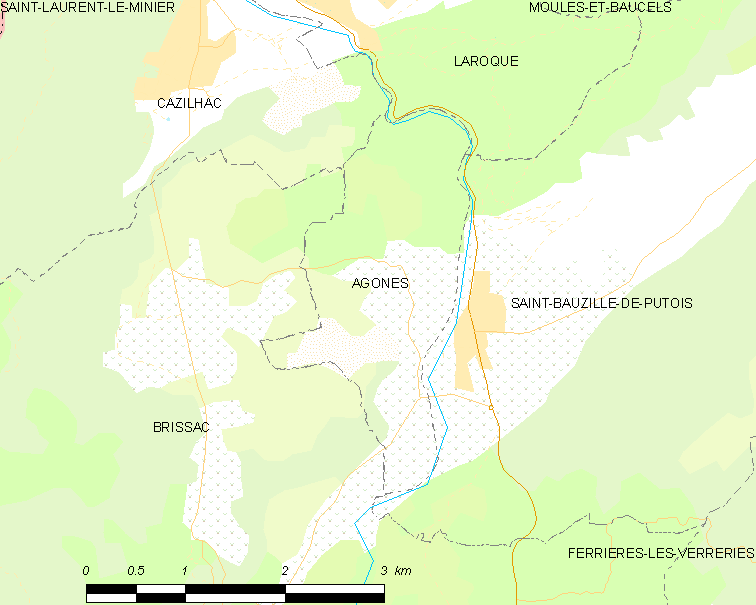
Map

== See also ==
- Communes of the Hérault department
