= Vernostonos =

Celtic deity

Verostonos (or Vernostonus) was a god in ancient Celtic polytheism, worshipped in Roman Britain. His name links him to alder-trees. Altar-stones raised to him have been recovered in the United Kingdom, such as that at Ebchester in County Durham (RIB 1102, DEO VERNOSTONO COCIDIO VIRILIS GER V S L). His association with Cocidius in that inscription suggests that he may have been linked with, or an epithet of, that more widely attested war god.

== Etymology ==
Vernostonos may be derived from the Proto-Celtic *Werno-stonos meaning 'the groaning of alder-trunks' (cf. ).

== Sources ==
- British Museum, London, England.
- Lancaster museum, Lancaster, England.
- Newcastle Museum of Antiquities, Newcastle, England.
- Penrith Museum, Penrith, England.
- Verovicium Roman Museum, Housesteads Fort, Northumberland, England.
- York Castle Museum, York, England.
