= Silvanus (mythology) =

Roman tutelary deity of woods

- Tutelary god of woods and uncultivated lands, protector of field boundaries and cattle, protector against wolves
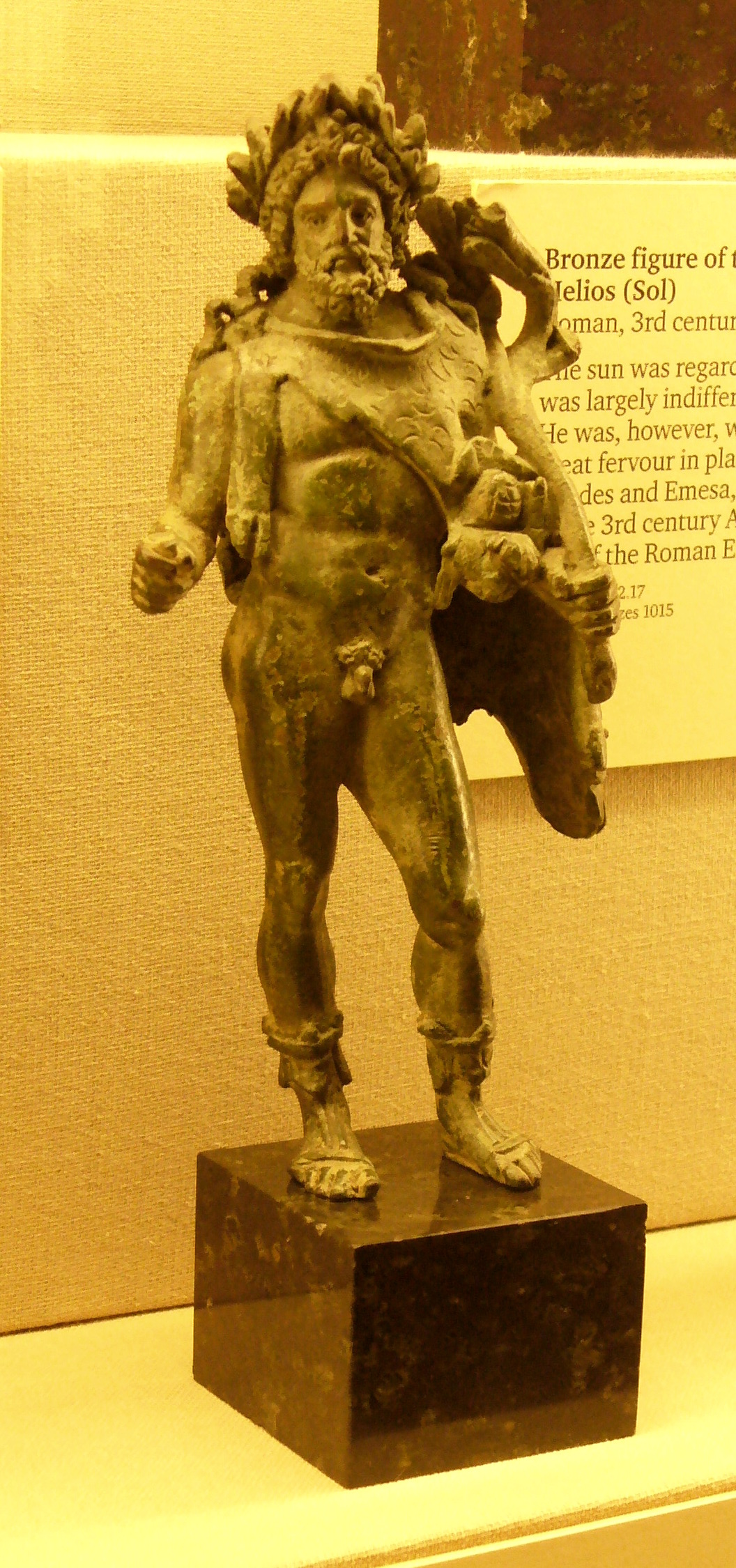
- Bronze statue of Silvanus, said to be from Nocera in southern Italy.
- Abode: The forest
- Symbols: Pan flute, cypress
- Gender: male

Equivalents
- Etruscan: Selvans?
- Greek: Silenus

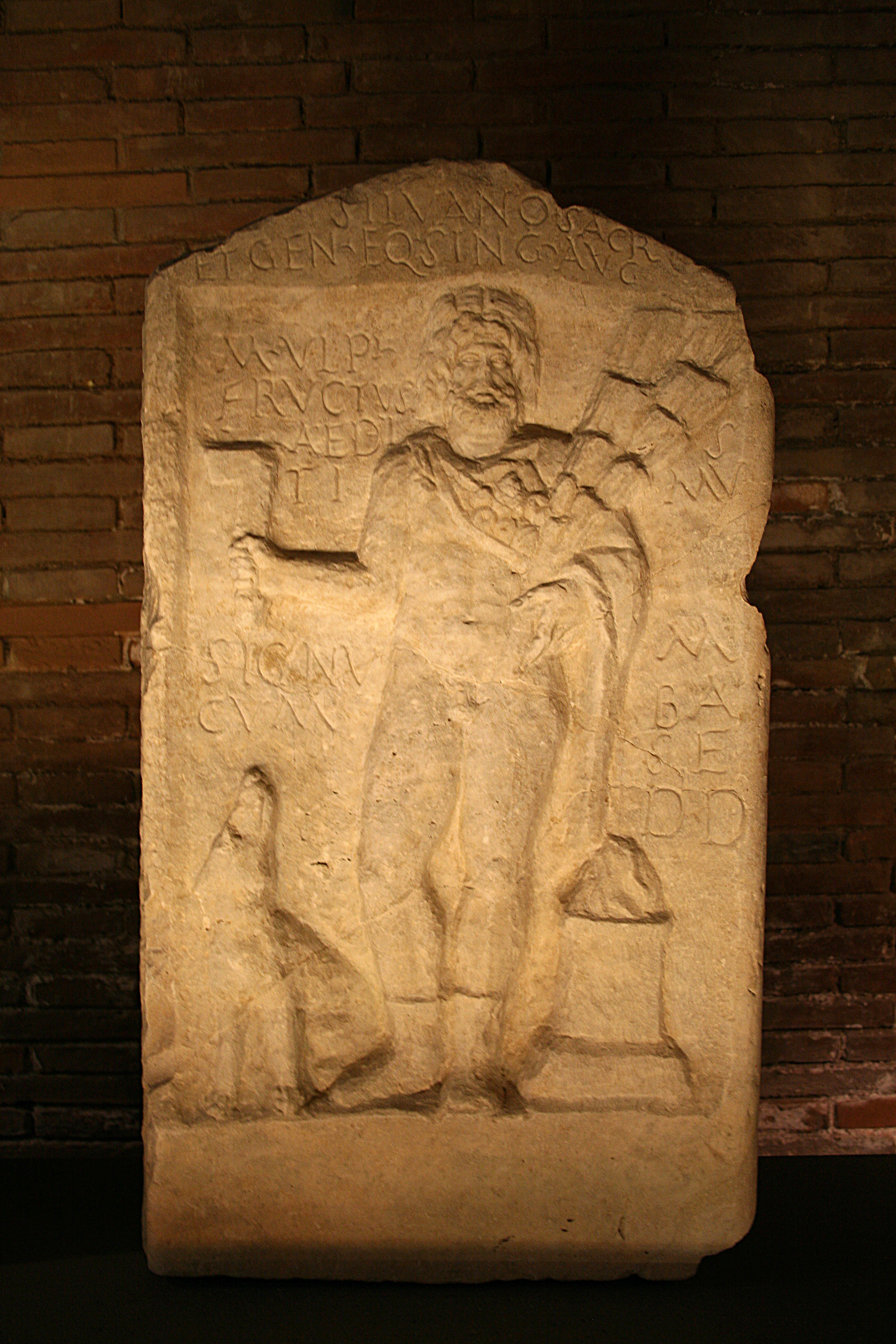
Altar decorated with a bas-relief depicting the god Sylvanus Capitoline Museums in Rome.

Silvanus (/sɪlˈveɪnəs/; meaning "of the woods" in Latin) was a Roman tutelary deity of woods and uncultivated lands. As protector of the forest (sylvestris deus), he especially presided over plantations and delighted in trees growing wild. He is also described as a god watching over the fields and husbandmen, protecting in particular the boundaries of fields. The similarly named Etruscan deity Selvans may be a borrowing of Silvanus, or not even related in origin.

Silvanus is described as the divinity protecting the flocks of cattle, warding off wolves, and promoting their fertility. Dolabella, a rural engineer of whom only a few pages are known, states that Silvanus was the first to set up stones to mark the limits of fields, and that every estate had three Silvani:

- a Silvanus domesticus (in inscriptions called Silvanus Larum and Silvanus sanctus sacer Larum)
- a Silvanus agrestis (also called salutaris, literally "of the fields" or "saviour"), who was worshipped by shepherds, and
- a Silvanus orientalis, literally "of the east", that is, the god presiding over the point at which an estate begins.

Hence Silvani were often referred to in the plural.

== Etymology ==
The name Silvānus (Classical Latin: [s̠ɪɫ̪ˈwaː.nʊs̠]) is a derivation from Latin silva ('forest, wood'). It is cognate with the Latin words silvester ('wild, not cultivated'), silvicola ('inhabiting woodlands') or silvaticus ('of woodlands or scrub'). The etymology of silva is unclear.

== Attributes and associations ==
Like other gods of woods and flocks, Silvanus is described as fond of music; the syrinx was sacred to him, and he is mentioned along with the Pans and Nymphs. Later speculators even identified Silvanus with Pan, Faunus, Inuus and Aegipan. He must have been associated with the Italian Mars, for Cato refers to him consistently as Mars Silvanus. These references to Silvanus as an aspect of Mars combined with his association with forests and glades, give context to the worship of Silvanus as the giver of the art (techne) of forest warfare. In particular the initiation rituals of the evocati appear to have referenced Silvanus as a protective god of raiding for women and cattle, perhaps preserving elements of earlier Etruscan worship.

In the provinces outside of Italy, Silvanus was identified with numerous native gods:

- Sucellos, Poeninus, Sinquas and Tettus in Gaul and Germany.
- Callirius, Cocidius and Vinotonus in Britain. A Romano-Celtic Temple containing several plaques dedicated to Silvanus Callirius has been found at Camulodunum (modern Colchester).
- Calaedicus in Spain.
- The Mogiae in Pannonia.
- Selvans in Etruria (though the validity of this identification has been contested).
- Silenus, a Greek God, merged with Silvanus in Latin Literature.
- Pan (god of forests, pastures, and shepherds), in Greco-Roman mythology.
- Aristaeus, a god/patron of shepherds, harvest and other rural arts.
- Vidasus, an Illyrian god of forests, patron of shepherds, worshipped in Dalmatia and Pannonia Superior

Xavier Delamarre suggests the epithet Callirius may be related to Breton theonym Riocalat(is) (attested in Cumberland Quarries), and both mean "(God) With Wild Horses".

== Worship ==
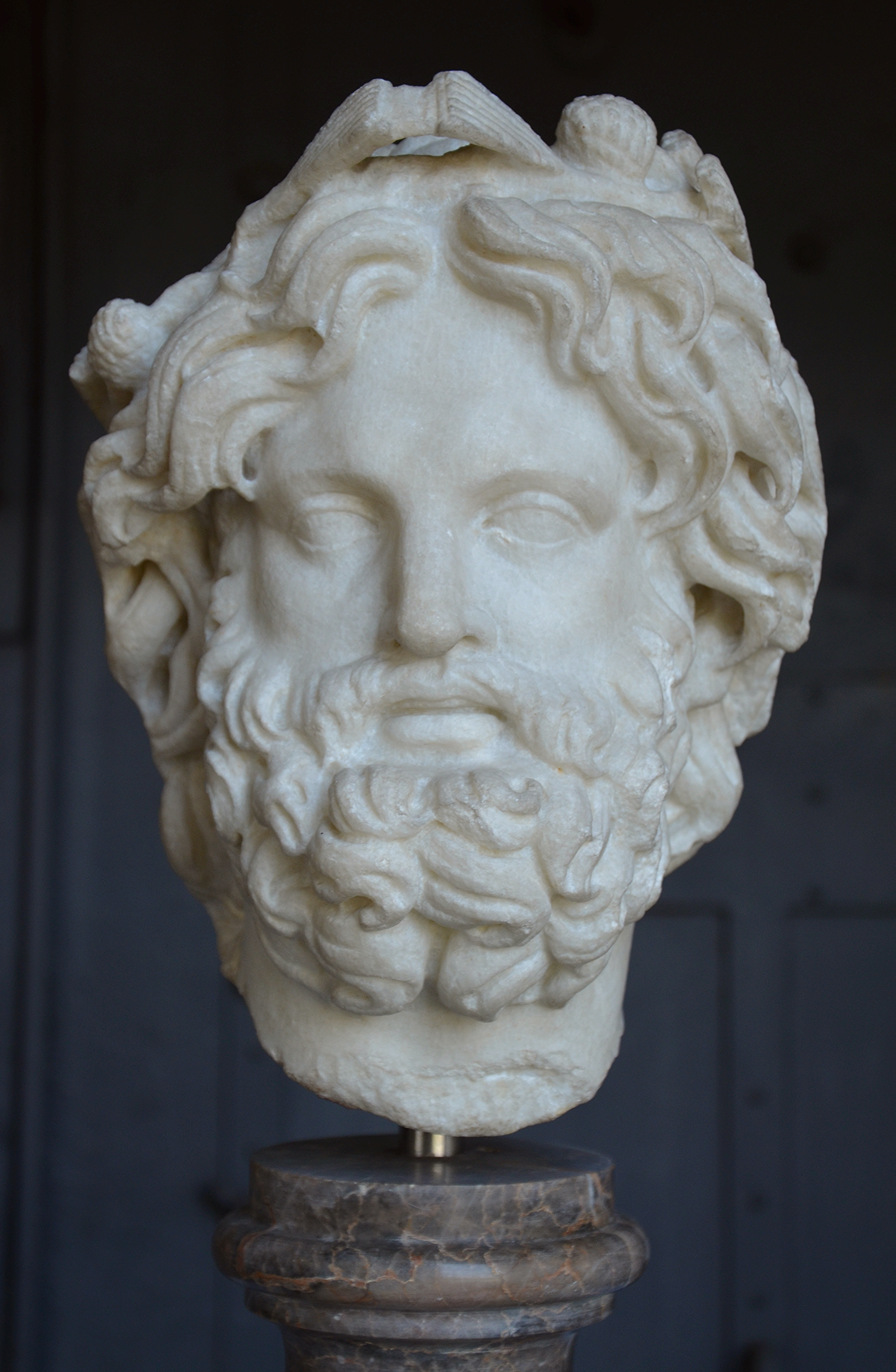
Head of Silvanus crowned with pine, Centrale Montemartini, Rome.

The sacrifices offered to Silvanus consisted of grapes, ears of grain, milk, meat, wine and pigs. In Cato's De Agricultura an offering to Mars Silvanus is described, to ensure the health of cattle; it is stated there that his connection with agriculture referred to only the labour performed by men, and that females were excluded from his worship. (Compare Bona Dea for a Roman deity from whose worship men were excluded.) Virgil relates that in the very earliest times the Tyrrhenian Pelasgians had dedicated a grove and a festival to Silvanus, a symbol for the wilderness of the god.

== In literature ==
In works of Latin poetry and art, Silvanus always appears as an old man, but as cheerful and in love with Pomona. Virgil represents him as carrying the trunk of a cypress (Greek: δενδροφόρος), about which the following myth is told. Silvanus – or Apollo according to other versions – was in love with Cyparissus, and once by accident killed a pet hind belonging to Cyparissus. The latter died of grief, and was metamorphosed into a cypress.

In Edmund Spenser's epic poem The Faerie Queene (1590–96), Silvanus appears in Canto VI of Book I. His 'wyld woodgods' (Stanza 9) save the lost and frightened Lady Una from being molested by Sans loy and take her to him. They treat her as a Queen because of her great beauty. Spenser writes in Stanza 14:

So towards old Syluanus they did her bring;
Who with the noyse awaked, commeth out,
To weet the cause, his weake steps gouerning,
And aged limbs on Cypresse stadle stout,
And with an yvie twyne his wast is girt gud about.

== Cognate deities ==
The Etruscan god Selvans appears to be a close cognate to Silvanus: Even to the point of being associated with boundary stones under the name Selvansl Tularias, and (protection from) wolves as Selvans Calusta. It is unclear whether the Roman god was adopted by the Etruscans, or the Etruscan god inherited by the Romans.

There may also be some relation to the Gaulish deity Cernunnos, but the only current evidence for that Gaulish deity being known anywhere close to Etruria are rock drawings near Valcamonica in Lombardy.
