= Castra Exploratorum =

Coordinates: 55.0367°N 2.9459°W

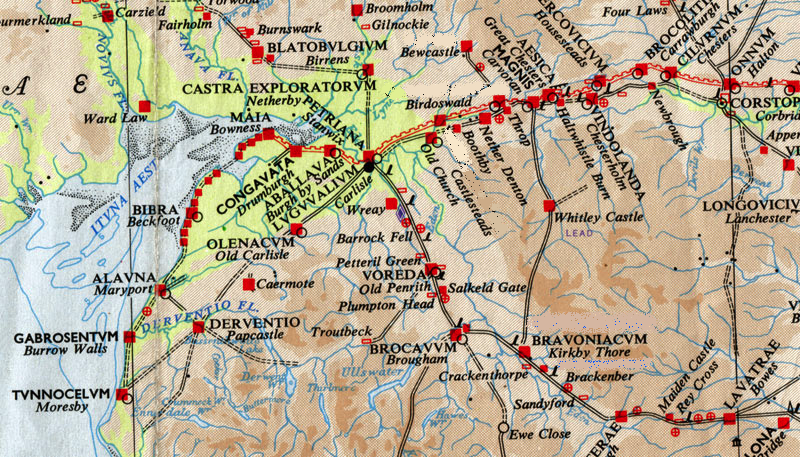
Roman forts and roads in the north of England around AD 130

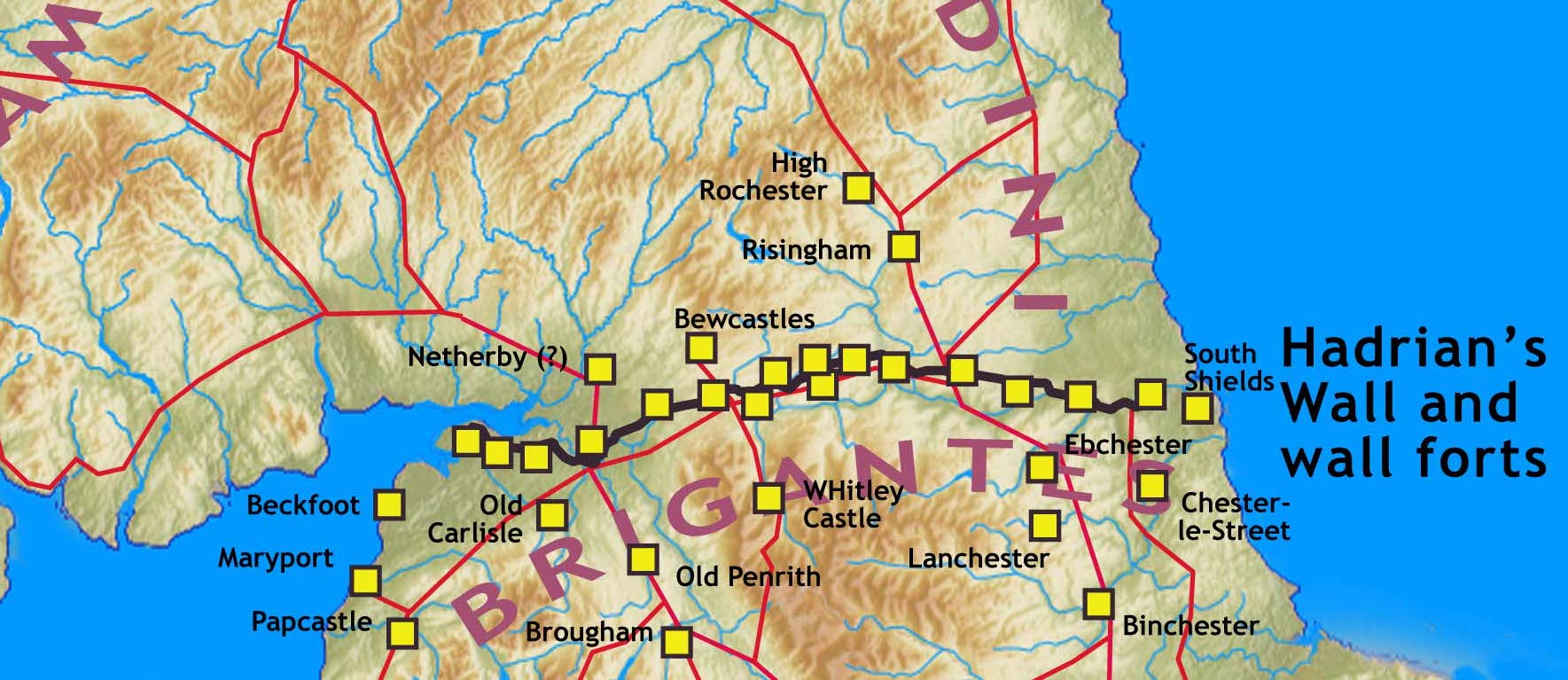
Forts in northern Britain around the year 270

Castra Exploratorum (Latin for "Fortress of the Scouts") was a Roman fort and associated substantial civil settlement now in the grounds of Netherby Hall, Cumbria. It was first built by Agricola during his conquest of the north in around 80 AD.

== History ==
The first known garrison was Cohors I Nervanorum in about the year 125 when the forts of Hadrian's Wall were built further south. At this time it became an "outpost fort" to the north of the frontier, about half a day's march from the wall.

As shown by inscriptions, the fort became the headquarters of the frontier scouts in the reorganisation of Britain into two provinces by Septimius Severus or Caracalla c. 200. It was then garrisoned by the larger Cohors I Aelia Hispanorum c. 211. This cohort—nominally comprising 1000 men and about 300 horses—required a larger fort.

The fort baths were built around 222 AD when a temple was also rebuilt and occupation continued well into the 4th century, as with Caracalla's other four outpost forts.
