= Belatucadros =

Celtic deity identified with Mars

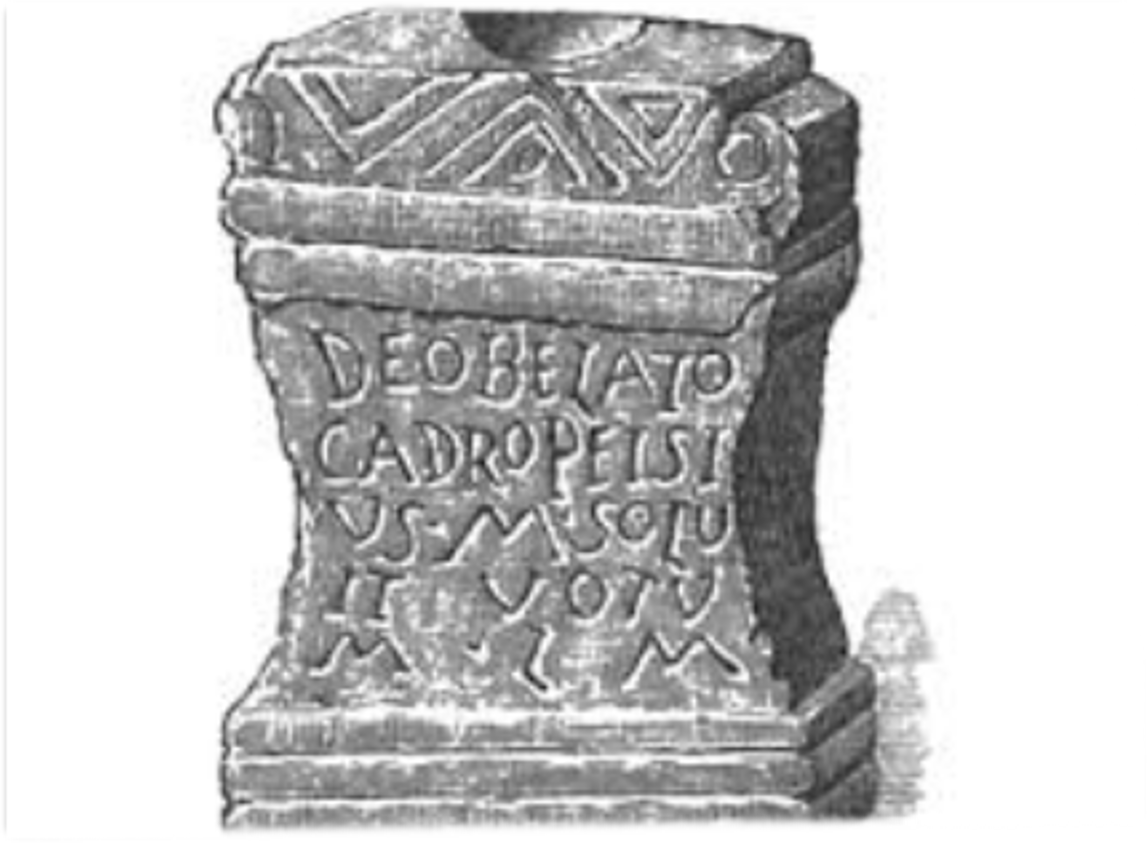
Altar to Belatocadrus from Kirkbride, Cumbria. It is inscribed DEO BELATO/CADROPEISI/US·M[ile]·SOLU/IT VOTU/M·L[ibens] M[erito].

Belatucadros or Belatucadrus, is an indigenous Celtic deity whose worship pre-dates the Roman conquest of Britain. He was venerated heavily across the modern county of Cumbria, serving as a principal deity for the local Carvetii (Common Brittonic: *Carwetī) tribe. During the subsequent Roman occupation, he was identified with Mars through the interpretatio romana, appearing on roughly 28 inscriptions in the vicinity of Hadrian's Wall where he was worshipped by both native Britons and lower-ranked Roman soldiers. In five of these inscriptions, he is explicitly conflated and called Mars Belatucadrus. His name is frequently translated as "fair shining one" or "fair slayer."

Dedications to Balatocadrus, Balatucadrus, Balaticaurus, Balatucairus, Baliticaurus, Belatucairus, Belatugagus, Belleticaurus, Blatucadrus and Blatucairus are generally accepted as variants of the most common of these forms: Belatucadrus. Altars dedicated to him were usually small, simple and plain, leading to the suggestion that this god was mainly worshipped by people of low social status. His name never appears with a female consort and there is no certain extant representation of him.

Celtic scholar Anne Ross suggests that his name, and that of a similar local god, Cocidius, may be epithets for a common general type of Celtic horned god. A horned head was found near the shrine of Belatucadros at Netherby, Cumbria but cannot be securely identified with the god.

== Sources ==
- Coulston, Jon C.; Phillips, E.J. (1988). Corpus Signorum Imperii Romani, Great Britain, Volume I, Fascicule 6. Hadrian's Wall West of the North Tyne, and Carlisle. New York and Oxford: Oxford University Press. ISBN 0-19-726058-6.
- Ross, Anne (1967). Pagan Celtic Britain. Routledge & Kegan Paul. ISBN 0-902357-03-4.
