= Cocidius =

Roman-British deity identified with Mars

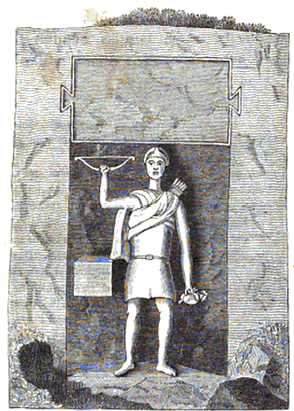
A relief of Cocidius, now partially destroyed at Risingham

In Romano-British religion, Cocidius was a deity worshipped in northern Britain. The Romans equated him with Mars, god of war and hunting, and also with Silvanus, god of forests, groves and wild fields. Like Belatucadros, he was probably worshipped by lower-ranked Roman soldiers as well as by the Britons for whom he was probably a tribal god - a genius loci.

== Etymology ==
Rivet and Smith note that the name may be related to British Celtic cocco-, 'red' (compare Welsh coch and Cornish kogh), suggesting that statues of the god might have been painted red. A figure discovered in the 1980s in the Otterburn Training Area and is known as the Red One.

== Representations and dedications ==
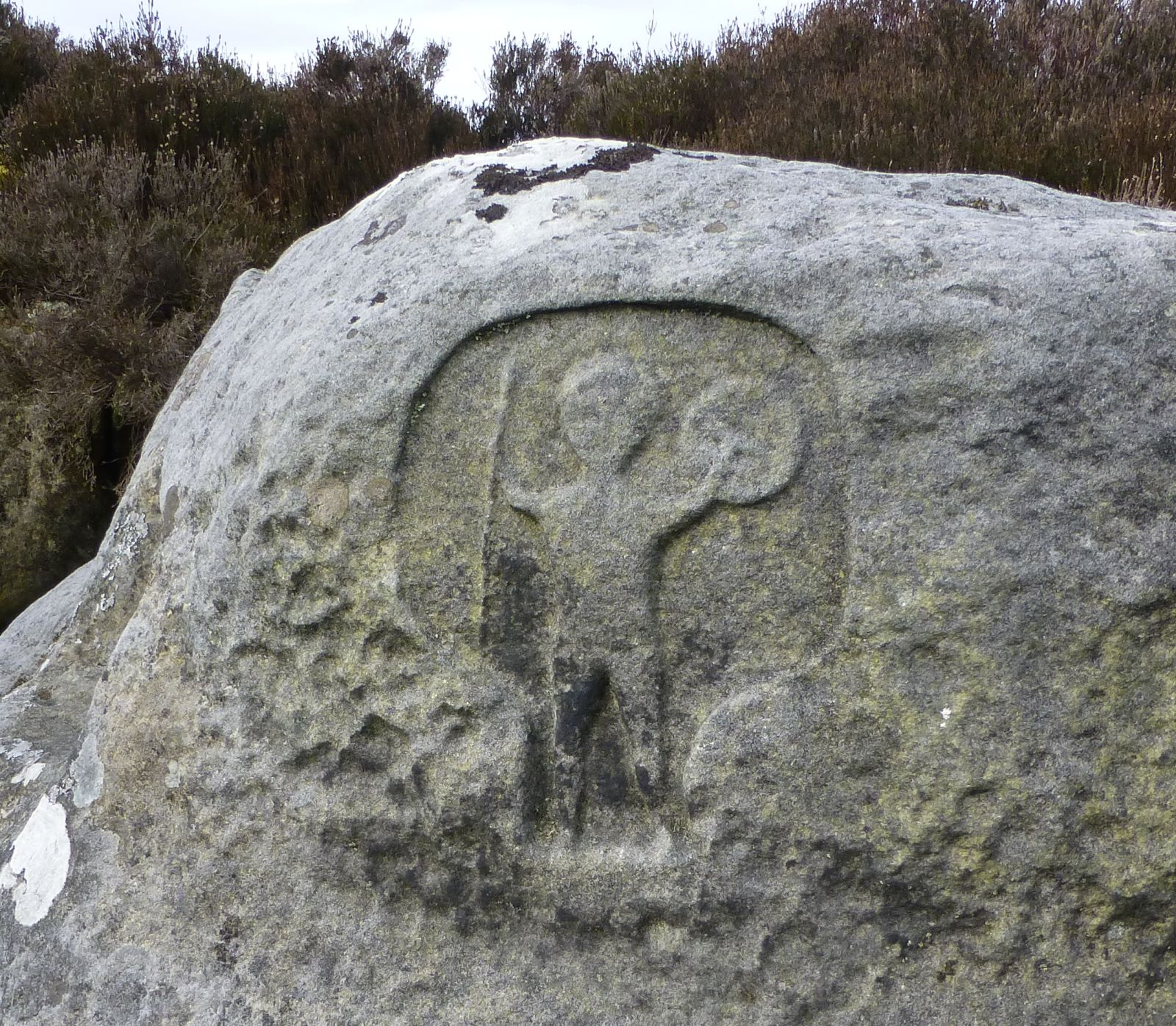
A relief of Cocidius at Harbottle in Northumberland

Fanocodi was a Roman place-name mentioned in the Ravenna Cosmography for a location close to the Solway Firth; the name has been derived from Fanum Cocidii, or temple of Cocidius, and the place identified with Bewcastle. There are dedications to Cocidius around Hadrian's Wall and Cumbria, including the forts at Birdoswald and Bewcastle. Another inscription, at Ebchester, refers to him as Cocidius Vernostonus, Cocidius of the alder tree. A 2000-year-old carving of Cocidius was found in 2006 near Chesters Fort on Hadrian's Wall. This was dubbed the little man and shows a figure with its arms flung wide and legs braced firmly against the ground. Although the gender is not depicted, the shape and accessories are seemingly male, with a shield in the left hand, a sword in the right, and a scabbard hanging from the belt around his tunic. This is one of at least nine representations known in the Hadrian's Wall corridor, and a further 25 or so inscriptions dedicated to him. Most of these are along the western portion of the Wall, the most spectacular being found at Yardhope, where a figure in bas-relief brandishes spear and shield on a vertical rock-face at the entrance to a small shrine.

== In literature ==
William A. Young suggests that the characters of the 'Dark Man' in the Brythonic romance Owain, or the Lady of the Fountain, the guardian of the chapel in Guillaume le Clerc's Fergus of Galloway, and the Brown Man of the Moor in John Leyden's The Cout o' Keeldar (1802) have their origins in Cocidius.

== See also ==
- Vernostonos, possibly an epithet of Cocidius
