= Margaret Howard =

Margaret Howard may refer to:

- Margaret Howard, Duchess of Norfolk, née Margaret Audley, (died 1564)
- Margaret Howard, Countess of Nottingham, née Margaret Stewart, (1591–1639)
- Lady Margaret Howard, stepmother of Queen Katherine Howard, married Lord Edmund Howard
- Margaret Howard, Lady Arundell, sister of Queen Katherine Howard
- Lady Margaret Sackville (1562–1591), née Howard, wife of Robert Sackville, 2nd Earl of Dorset
