= Edward Sackville, 4th Earl of Dorset =

English courtier, soldier and politician

The Right Honourable Edward Sackville KG KB
- Earl of Dorset
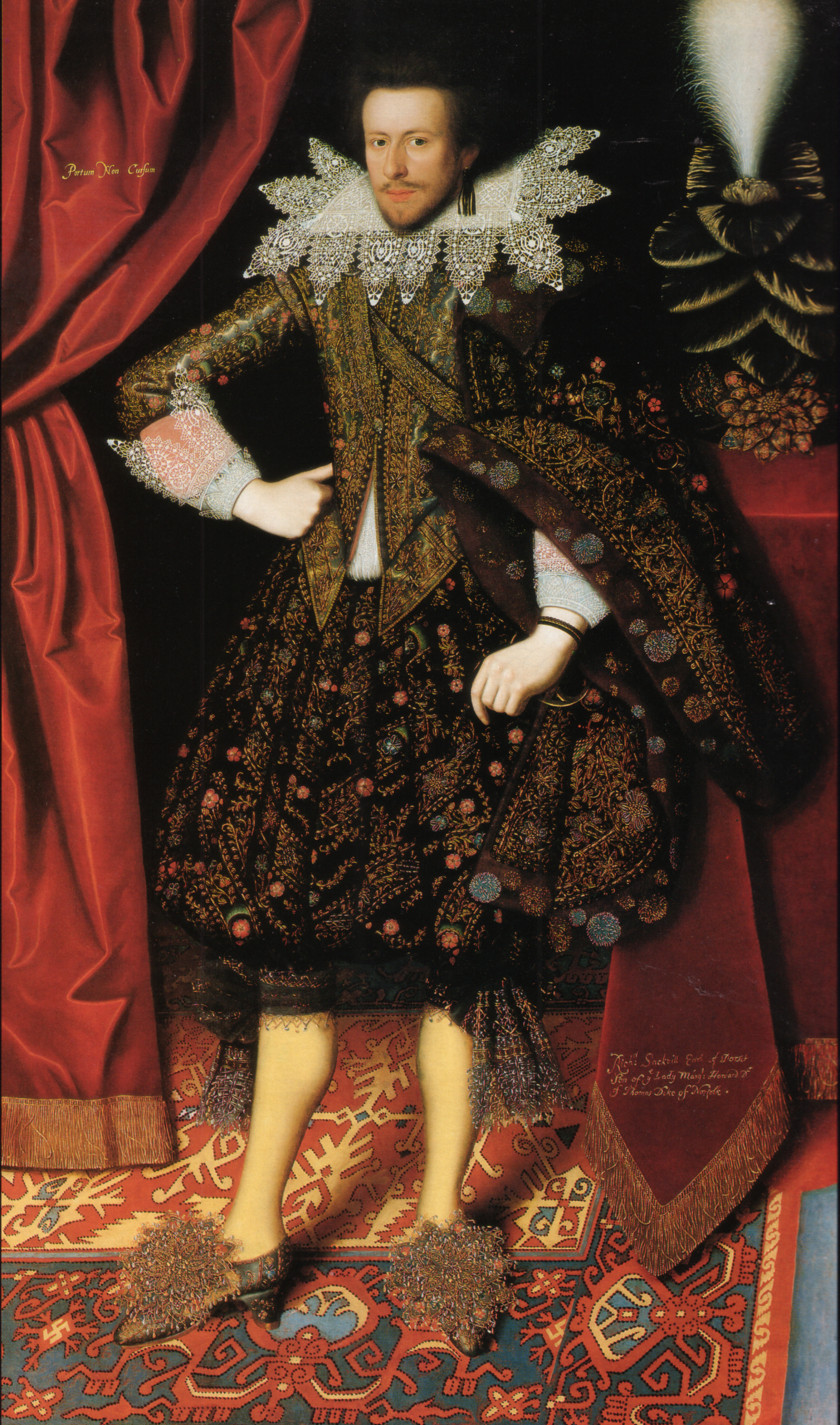
- Edward Sackville, later 4th Earl of Dorset, c. 1614, by William Larkin.

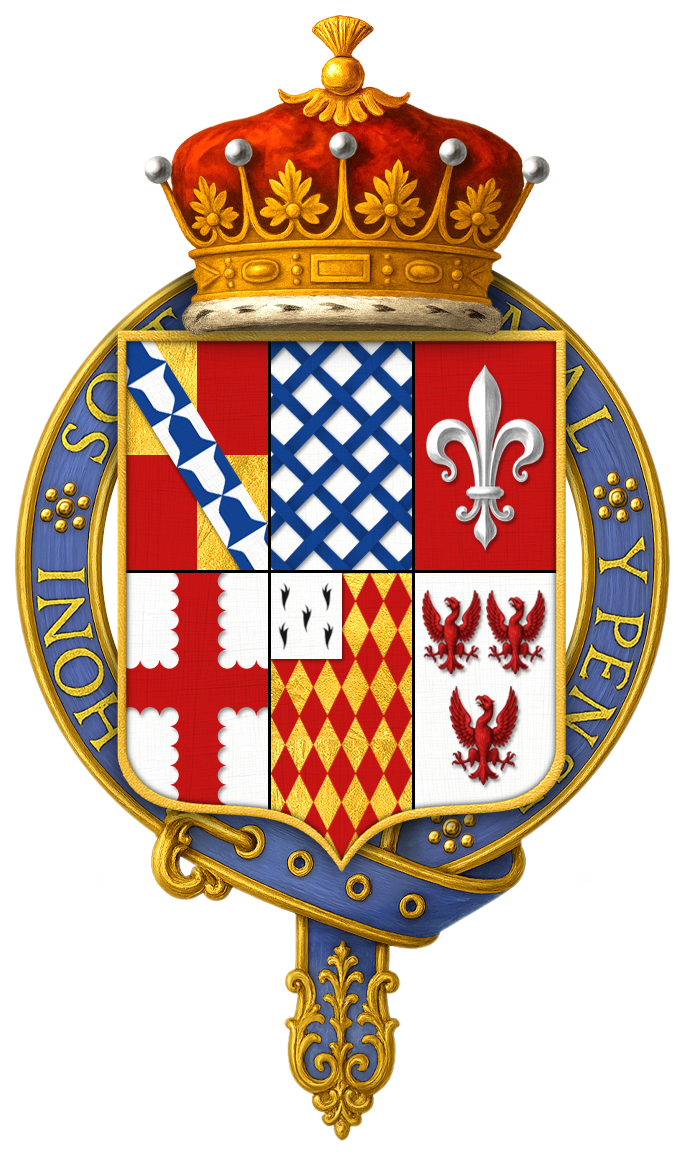
- Coat of arms
- Tenure: 1624–1652
- Predecessor: Richard Sackville, 3rd Earl of Dorset
- Successor: Richard Sackville, 5th Earl of Dorset
- Born: 1590
- Died: July 17, 1652 (aged 61–62)
- Spouse: Mary Curzon (m. 1612; died 1645)
- Issue: Lady Mary Sackville; Richard Sackville, 5th Earl of Dorset; Hon. Edward Sackville
- Father: Robert Sackville, 2nd Earl of Dorset
- Mother: Lady Margaret Sackville

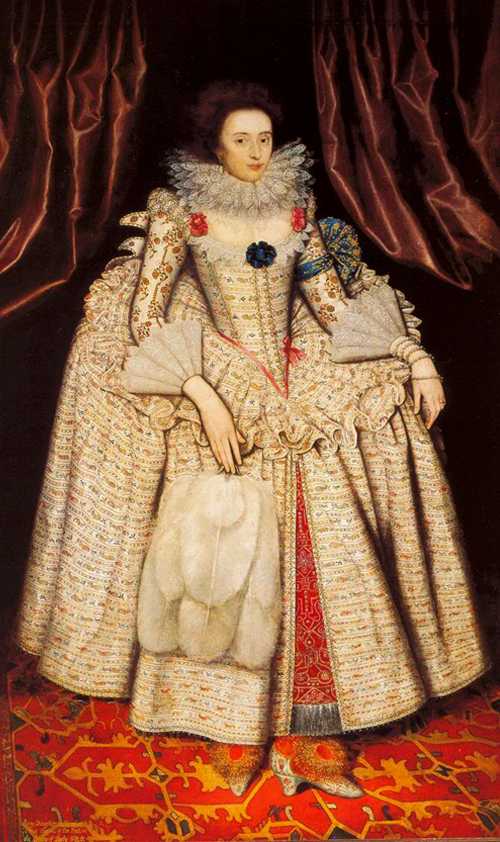
His wife wife Mary Curzon, daughter and heiress of George Curzon (d.1622) of Croxall Hall in Derbyshire, was appointed governess of the royal children for the Stuart family, her duties involved the upbringing of the princes and princesses during the turbulent lead-up to the English Civil War. Her payment ensured that Knole House remained in the Dorset (Sackville) family. She was given a lavish funeral in Westminster Abbey.

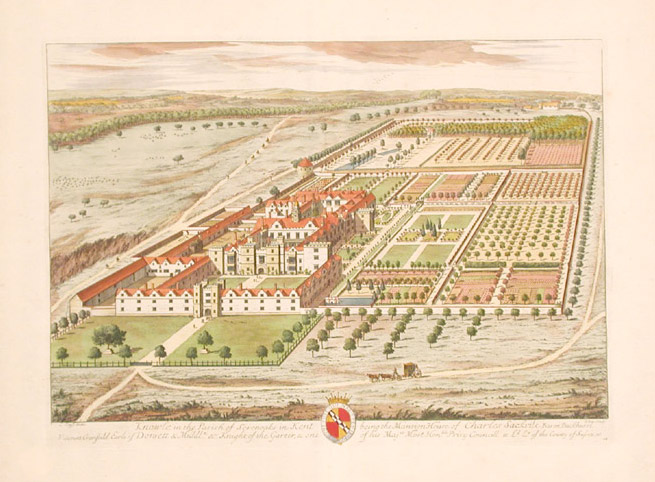
Knole House from Kip and Knyff's Britannia Illustrata (1709)

Edward Sackville, 4th Earl of Dorset KG, KB (baptized 5 March 1590 – 17 July 1652) was an English courtier, soldier and politician. He sat in the House of Commons from 1621 to 1622 and became Earl of Dorset in 1624. He fought a duel in his early life, and was later involved in colonisation in North America. He supported the Royalist cause in the English Civil War.

== Early life ==
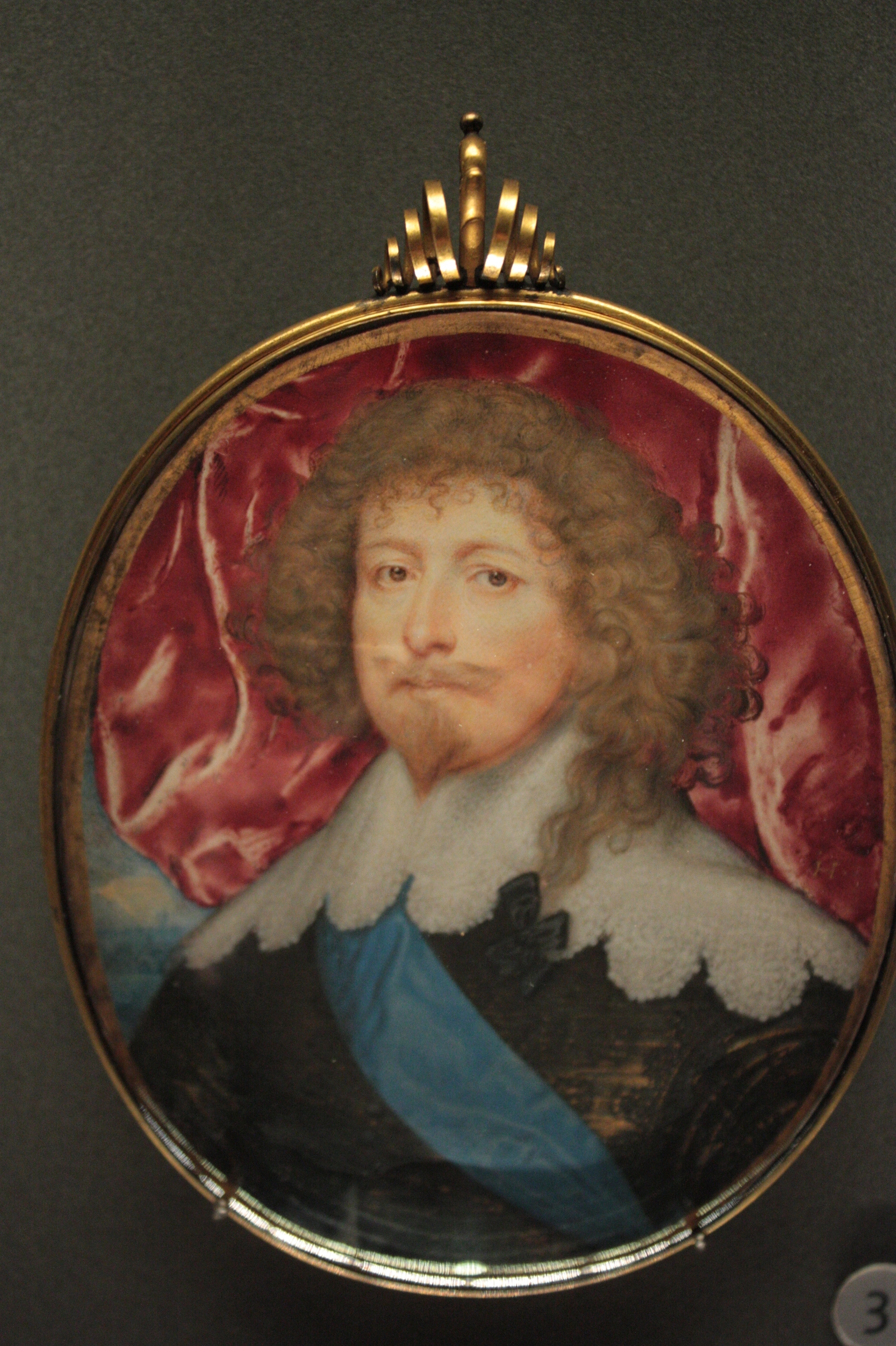
Edward Sackville, miniature by John Hoskins, 1635

Baptized at the parish church of St Mary le Strand, Westminster, Sackville was the younger surviving son of Robert Sackville, 2nd Earl of Dorset, by his first wife Margaret, a daughter of the Duke of Norfolk. He matriculated from Christ Church, Oxford, with his brother Richard, on 26 July 1605. He was awarded MA at Cambridge University and was incorporated at Oxford from Cambridge on 9 July 1616.

In August 1613 he became notorious for killing Edward Bruce, 2nd Lord Kinloss in a duel. The duel may have concerned Venetia Stanley, a society beauty and a granddaughter of Edward Stanley, 3rd Earl of Derby, or possibly over Sackville having seduced Kinloss' sister. The meeting took place on a piece of ground purchased for the purpose two miles from Bergen-op-Zoom, Netherlands, which even in 1814 was known as Bruceland. Sackville was run through the body and lost a finger while attempting to disarm Kinloss, but ultimately dispatched his opponent with two thrusts to the chest. Though gravely wounded, Sackville survived, but Venetia Stanley ultimately married Sir Kenelm Digby who after his marriage maintained friendly relations with Sackville, referring to him as the "Mardontius" in his memoirs. Sackville sent, in self-justification, a long narrative from Louvain, dated 8 September 1613, with copies of Bruce's challenges. Sackville's life was attempted soon after his return to England.

== Early political career and colonist activity ==
Some sources claim that in 1614, Sackville was elected MP for Sussex and was one of the leaders of the popular party but this is disputed in other records of the Addled Parliament. In 1616 he visited Lyons and procured the release of Sir Edward Herbert who had been arrested there. He was made a Knight of the Bath on 3 November 1616 when Charles I was created Prince of Wales. From 1619 he was a leading member of the party of the Virginia Company which supported Sir Edwin Sandys. On 22 July 1620 he sailed as a commander in the forces sent under Sir Horatio Vere to assist Frederick I, the Bohemian king, who was James I's son-in-law. He was present at the Battle of White Mountain on 8 November 1620.

In 1621 Sackville was elected MP for Sussex. In March he was nominated chairman of the commons committee for the inspection of the courts of justice, but did not act. He spoke on behalf of Francis Bacon in parliament on 17 March 1621, and often pleaded for him with Buckingham. In July 1621 he was briefly ambassador to Louis XIII of France. In November 1621 he vigorously defended the proposal to vote a subsidy for the recovery of the Palatinate, declaring that "the passing-bell was now tolling for religion". This speech has been wrongly dated as of 1623, when parliament was not sitting. In April 1623, the King "roundly and soundly" reproved Sackville at a meeting of the directors of the Virginia company. He was governor of the Bermuda Islands Company in 1623. On 23 May 1623, he received a licence to travel for three years and was nominated ambassador to Louis XIII again in September 1623. He was in Rome in 1624, and visited Marc Antonio de Dominis archbishop of Spalato, in his dungeon. While he was at Florence he received the news of the death of his elder brother Richard Sackville, 3rd Earl of Dorset, which took place on 28 March 1624 and he thereupon became fourth Earl of Dorset.

== Earl of Dorset ==
Dorset succeeded to family estates which were heavily encumbered and he was selling land to pay off his brother's debts on 26 June 1626 (money was still owing on 26 September 1650). He became joint Lord Lieutenant of Sussex and joint Lord Lieutenant of Middlesex, and held several other offices, including the mastership of Ashdown Forest, and stewardship of Great Yarmouth from 1629. He was made K.G. on 15 May 1625, and installed by proxy on 23 December. At the coronation of Charles I on 2 February 1626, he was a commissioner of claims, and carried the first sword, and he was called to the privy council on 3 August 1626. His influence at court was fully established by his appointment as lord chamberlain to Queen Henrietta Maria on 16 July 1628. As such, he was a prime mover in theatre and drama in London, and was the force behind the founding of the Salisbury Court Theatre at Salisbury Court off Fleet Street where he lived. He was a commissioner for planting Virginia in 1631 and 1634.

As a peer and privy councillor Dorset showed great activity. He was a commissioner on 30 May 1635 and 10 April 1636 for dealing with the new buildings which had been erected in or about London and Westminster. He was a lord commissioner of the admiralty, one of the adventurers with the Earl of Lindsey and others for draining various parts of Lincolnshire and a commissioner for improving the supply of saltpetre. On 13 June 1636, he was constable of Beaumaris Castle. While sitting on the Star-chamber commission in 1636, he advised the imprisonment of the peers who refused to pay a forced loan although in April 1636 he himself was one of the defaulters for ship-money in Kent to the extent of £5. He kept up his connection with America, and petitioned for a grant of Sandy Hook Island (lat. 44°), on 10 December 1638. He was nominated on a committee of council to deal with ship-money on 20 May 1640 but abstained carefully from committing himself to the illegal proceedings encouraged by his more violent colleagues.

In 1640 Dorset was one of the peers nominated to act as regents while the king was absent in the north. In January 1641 he helped to arrange the marriage of the Princess Mary with the Prince of Orange, and was a commissioner of regency again from 9 August to 25 November. He opposed the proceedings against the bishops, and ordered the trained bands of Middlesex to fire on the mob that gathered to intimidate parliament on 29 November 1641. According to the historian Clarendon the Commons wished to impeach Dorset either for this or "for some judgment he had been party to in the Star-chamber or council table".

== Civil War ==
Early in 1642, at the onset of the English Civil War, Dorset joined the king at York, and pledged himself to support a troop of sixty horse. He attested to the king's declaration on 15 June 1642, that he abhorred the idea of war. In July he attended the queen in Holland, but returned before the king's standard was raised at Nottingham. On 25 August he was sent, with Lord Southampton and Sir John Colepeper, to treat with the parliamentary leaders. On the same date, parliamentary soldiers plundered Knole House. He was present at the Battle of Edgehill. He may have been in charge of the young princes as James II wrote in 1679 that "the old Earl of Dorset at Edgehill, being commanded by the king, my father, to go and carry the prince and myself up the hill out of the battle, refused to do it, and said he would not be thought a coward for ever a king's son in Christendom". He went to Oxford with the king, and more than once protested against the continuation of the war. He made a speech at the council table against one by the Earl of Bristol and this was circulated as a tract on 18 January 1643. He was made a commissioner of the king's treasury on 7 March 1643, and was Lord Chamberlain of the household from 21 January 1644 to 27 April 1646. Early in 1644, he was also entrusted with the privy seal and the presidency of the council. He made sensible speeches, which were printed in Oxford and London as "shewing his good affection to the Parliament and the whole state of this Kingdom". He signed the letter asking Essex to promote peace, in January 1644. He was one of the committee charged with the defence of Oxford; and was nominated by Charles in December 1645 one of those to whom he would entrust the militia. He was one of the signatories to the capitulation of Oxford on 24 June 1646.

In June 1644 Dorset was assessed by the committee for the advance of money at £5,000 and his eldest son was assessed at £1,500. In 1645 he resigned an estate of £6,000, the committee undertaking to pay his debts. In September 1646 he petitioned to compound for his delinquency on the Oxford articles, and his fine of one-tenth was fixed at £4,360. It was reduced to £2,415 on 25 March 1647, and he was discharged on 4 June 1650.

Dorset was said to be one of the six peers who intended to go to Charles at Hampton Court in October 1647 and stay with him as a council, but parliament did not permit this.

After the execution of the king in 1649, Dorset is said never to have left his house in Salisbury Court, Fleet Street. He died there, aged 62, on 17 July 1652, and was buried in the family vault at Wytham. His monument was destroyed by fire on 16 June 1663. An elegy on him was printed, with heavy black edges, by James Howell, in a rare pamphlet entitled "Ah-Ha, Tumulus Thalamus".

Clarendon described Dorset as "beautiful, graceful, and vigorous: his wit pleasant, sparkling, and sublime... The vices he had were of the age, which he was not stubborn enough to contemn or resist". He was an able speaker, and on the whole, a moderate politician, combining a strong respect for the royal prerogative with an attachment to the Protestant cause and the liberties of parliament. He was evidently an excellent man of business.

== Family ==
Dorset married Mary Curzon, daughter and heiress of Sir George Curzon of Croxall Hall, Derbyshire in 1612. Their children were:

- Mary, died young on 30 October 1632
- Richard (1622–1677), fifth earl
- Edward, wounded at the First Battle of Newbury on 20 September 1643, and murdered by Parliamentary forces at Chawley in the parish of Cumnor, near Oxford, on 11 April 1646.

In 1630 Lady Mary was appointed royal governess for a term of twelve years of Charles, Prince of Wales and James, Duke of York, both later Kings of England and Scotland. She succeeded Jean Ker, Countess of Roxburghe, who was removed because she was a Catholic. She received charge of the younger children, Henry and his sister Elizabeth, on 20 July 1643, and was allowed £600 a year, with Knole House and Dorset House, in recognition of her services. She died in 1645 when she was about to be relieved of her duties, and, as a reward for her "godly and conscientious care and pains," received a public funeral in Westminster Abbey. After the Restoration, her son Richard petitioned the crown for further recognition of his late mother's service.

== Legacy ==
- Dorchester County, Maryland
- Cape Dorset
- Dorset Island
- Dorset culture

Parliament of England
Preceded by Sir Walter Covert; Sampson Lennard	Member of Parliament for Sussex; 1621–1622; With: Christopher Neville	Succeeded by Algernon Lord Peircy; Thomas Pelham
Political offices
Preceded by The Earl of Dorset	Lord Lieutenant of Sussex jointly with The Earl of Northumberland 1635–1642; Lord Maltravers 1636–1642; 1624–1642	English Interregnum
Preceded by The Duke of Buckingham	Lord Lieutenant of Middlesex jointly with The Earl of Holland; 1628–1642	Succeeded by The Earl of Holland
Preceded by The Earl of Essex	Lord Chamberlain; 1642–1649	Succeeded by The Earl of Manchester
Peerage of England
Preceded by Richard Sackville	Earl of Dorset; 1624–1652	Succeeded by Richard Sackville
