= Margaret Norfolk =

Margaret Norfolk may refer to:

- Margaret Howard, Duchess of Norfolk (1540 – 1564), née Margaret Audley
- Margaret, Duchess of Norfolk (c. 1320 – 1399)
