= Richard Sackville, 3rd Earl of Dorset =

English Earl (1589-1624)

The Right Honourable The Earl of Dorset
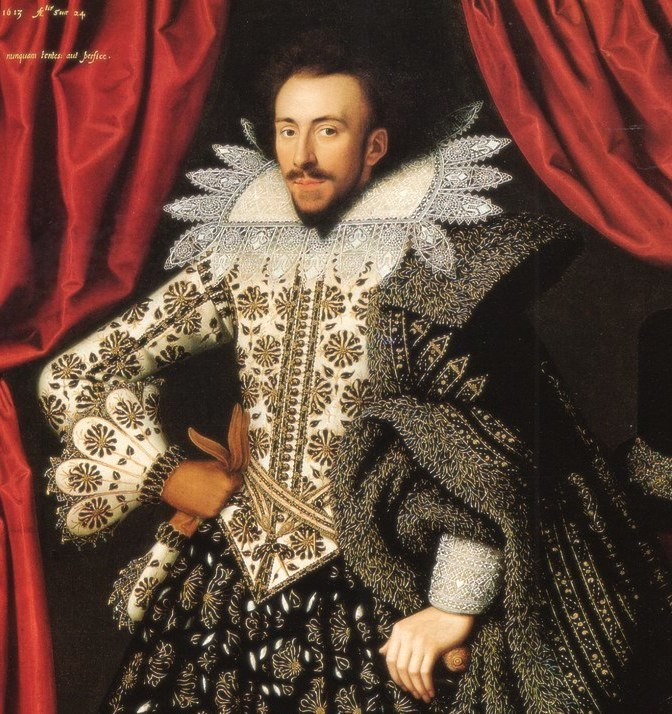
- Richard Sackville, 3rd Earl of Dorset, c. 1613

Personal details
- Born: 18 March 1589 London
- Died: 28 March 1624 (aged 35) Westminster, London, England
- Spouse(s): Lady Anne Clifford, Baroness Clifford
- Children: 5
- Parent(s): Robert Sackville, 2nd Earl of Dorset; Lady Margaret Howard

Richard Sackville, 3rd Earl of Dorset (18 March 1589 – 28 March 1624) was the eldest surviving son of Robert Sackville, 2nd Earl of Dorset, by his first wife, Lady Margaret Howard, daughter of Thomas Howard, 4th Duke of Norfolk and Margaret Audley.

Born at Charterhouse, London, Sackville was styled Lord Buckhurst from 1608 until 1609, when he succeeded his father as Earl of Dorset and inherited the family home of Knole House.

During the years 1612–24 Sackville served as a Lord Lieutenant of Sussex.

He married Lady Anne Clifford, daughter of George Clifford, 3rd Earl of Cumberland and Margaret, daughter of Francis Russell, 2nd Earl of Bedford on 27 February 1609, but their marriage was not a success; partisans of the Earl blame Lady Anne's headstrong personality, while partisans of the Countess blame the Earl's repeated infidelities, his extravagance and indebtedness – "one of the seventeenth century’s most accomplished gamblers and wastrels".

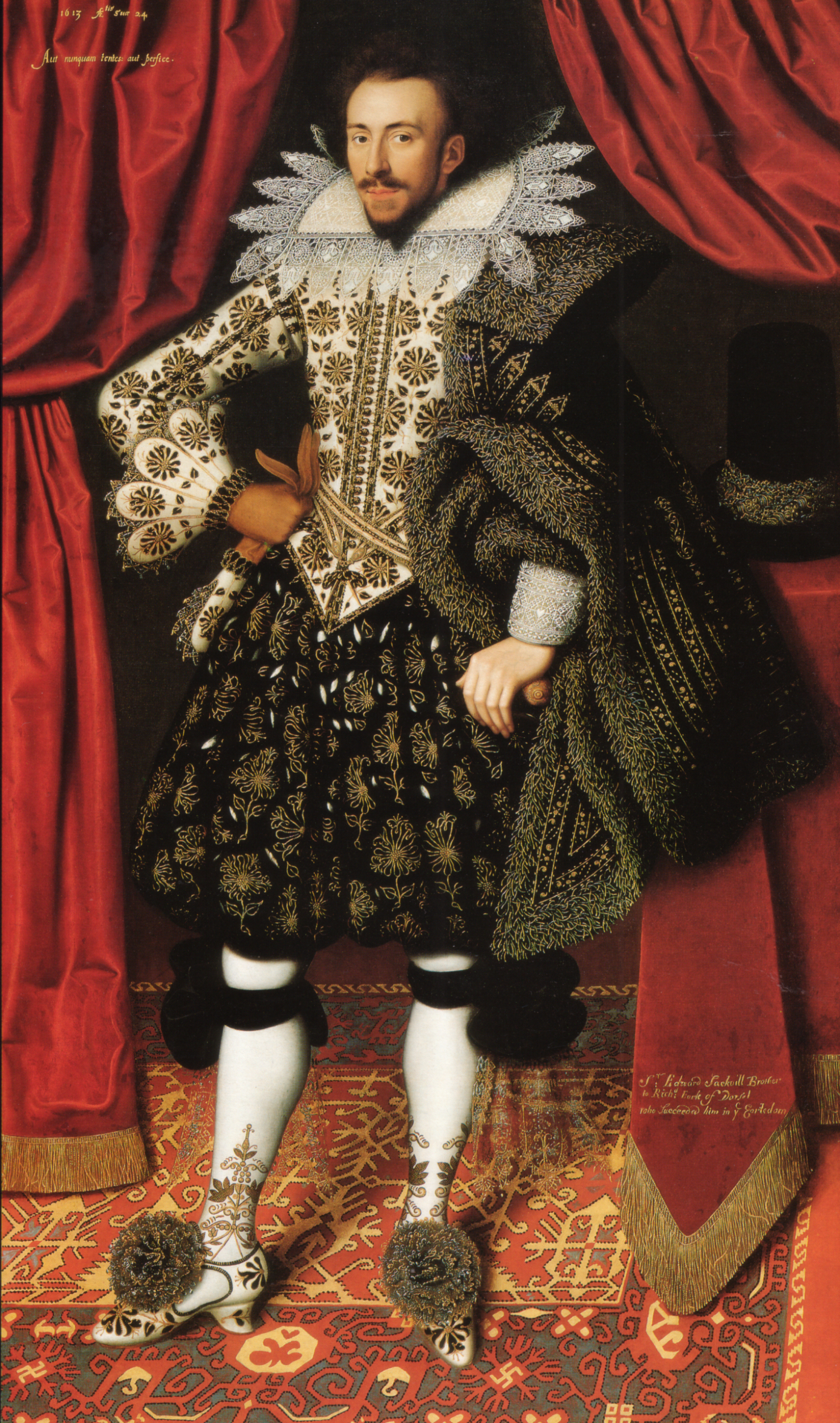
Richard Sackville, 3rd Earl of Dorset, c. 1613, by William Larkin.

A rumour noted later by the antiquary John Aubrey had it that one of Richard Sackville's "concubines" was Venetia Stanley. She was said to have had children by him and he settled upon her an annuity of £500 per annum. Among the Earl's other mistresses was Martha Penistone, the wife of Sir Thomas Penistone, one of the Earl's retinue.

At the time of their marriage, Lady Anne had been in a long-running legal contest over her inheritance rights; in 1617, the 3rd Earl signed away her claim on contested ancestral lands to James I, in return for a cash payment which the Earl used to pay off his gambling debts. A catalogue of their household at Knole between 1613 and 1624 survives. It records the names and roles of servants, and indicates where they sat for their meals. The list includes two African servants, Grace Robinson, a maid in the laundry, and John Morockoe, who worked in the kitchen. Both were described as "Blackamoors".

The 3rd Earl and Lady Anne had five children between 1612 and 1621; however, none of their three sons, born in 1616, 1618, and 1621, survived their father. Their two daughters, Isabella (born 6 October 1622, died 22 August 1661) and Margaret (born 2 July 1614, died May 1676) were longer lived. Margaret became the wife of John Tufton, 2nd Earl of Thanet.

The 3rd Earl died at Dorset House, London without a male heir on Easter Sunday of 1624 at Dorset House, London, and was succeeded by his younger brother Edward Sackville. He was buried on 7 April 1624 at St. Michael's Parish Church in Withyham, Sussex.

== Modern History ==
=== Painting ===
His painting by William Larkin (c.1585–1619) was eventually donated by Mrs Greville Howard in 1974 and ended up at Kenwood House, which was coincidentally the home of his great great granddaughter, Lady Elizabeth Finch later Countess of Mansfield, who had married William Murray, 1st Earl of Mansfield.

Political offices
Vacant Title last held by The Earl of Dorset	Lord Lieutenant of Sussex; 1612–1624	Succeeded by The Earl of Dorset
Peerage of England
Preceded by Robert Sackville	Earl of Dorset; 1609–1624	Succeeded by Edward Sackville
