= Thomas Audley, 1st Baron Audley of Walden =

English politician (1488–1544)

The Right Honourable The Lord Audley of Walden KG PC KS, JP
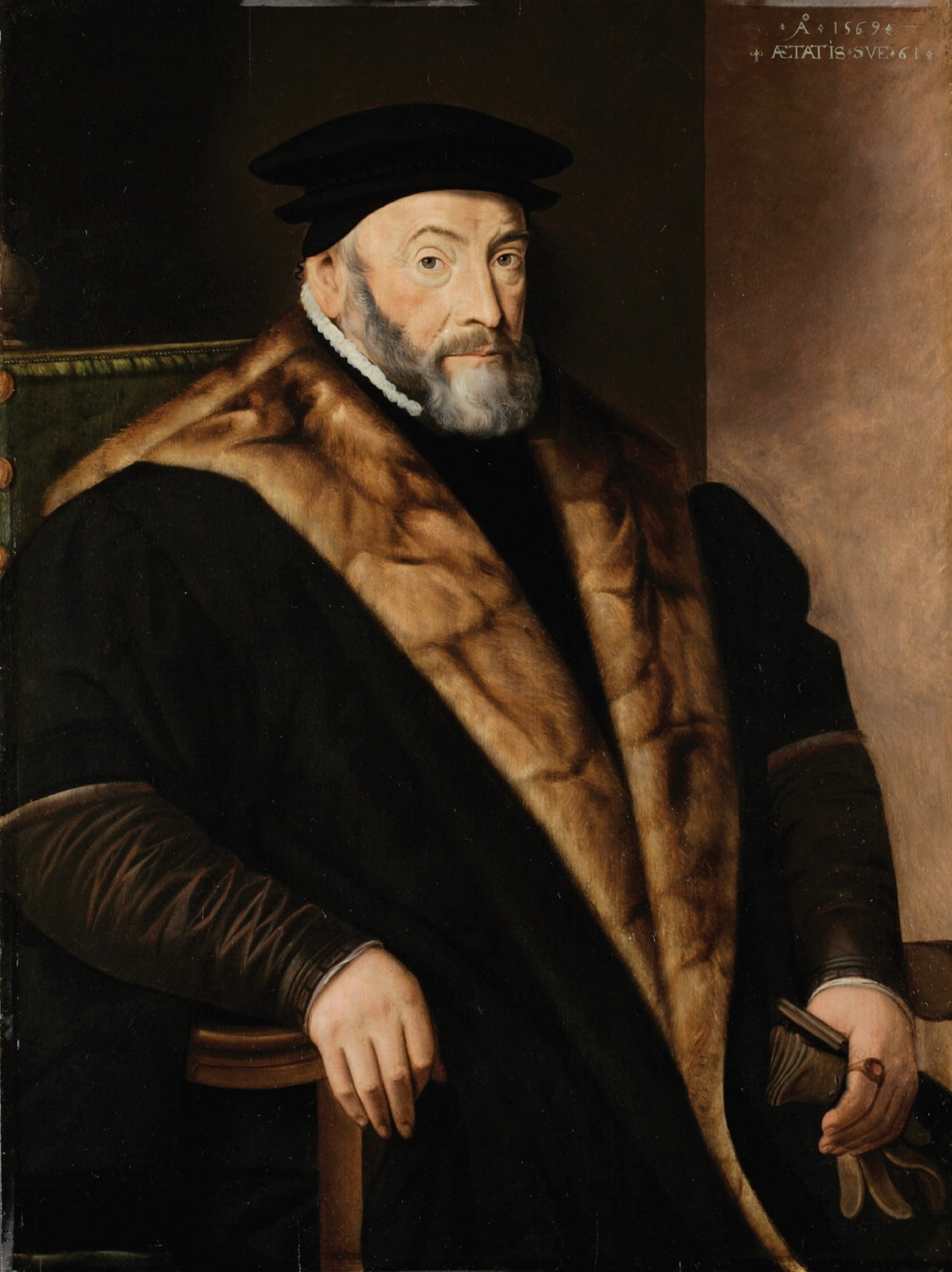
- Posthumous portrait, 1569

Lord Chancellor
- In office 26 January 1533 – 21 April 1544
- Preceded by: Sir Thomas More
- Succeeded by: The Earl of Southampton

Lord Keeper of the Great Seal
- In office 20 May 1532 – 21 April 1544
- Preceded by: Sir Thomas More
- Succeeded by: The Earl of Southampton

Speaker of the House of Commons
- In office 5 November 1529 – 26 January 1533
- Preceded by: Sir Thomas More
- Succeeded by: Sir Humphrey Wingfield

Personal details
- Born: ca. 1488 Earls Colne, Essex; Kingdom of England
- Died: 30 April 1544 (aged 56) Saffron Walden, Kingdom of England
- Spouse(s): Christina Barnardiston; Elizabeth Grey
- Children: 2, including Margaret Audley, Duchess of Norfolk

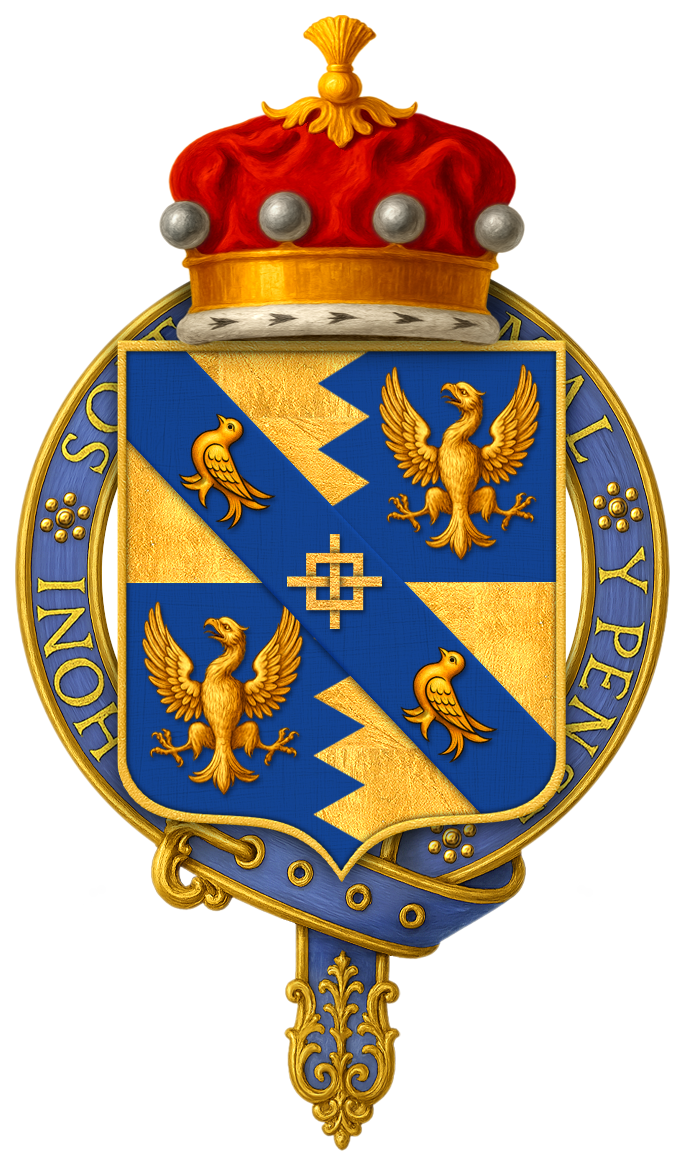
Arms of Sir Thomas Audley, 1st Baron Audley of Walden, KG: Quarterly per pale indented or and azure, in the 2nd and 3rd an eagle displayed of the 1st on a bend of the 2nd a fret between two martlets of the 1st. The fret or knot is a reference to the arms of Audley, Baron Audley, which family died out in the male line in 1391, and to which he does not appear to have been related.

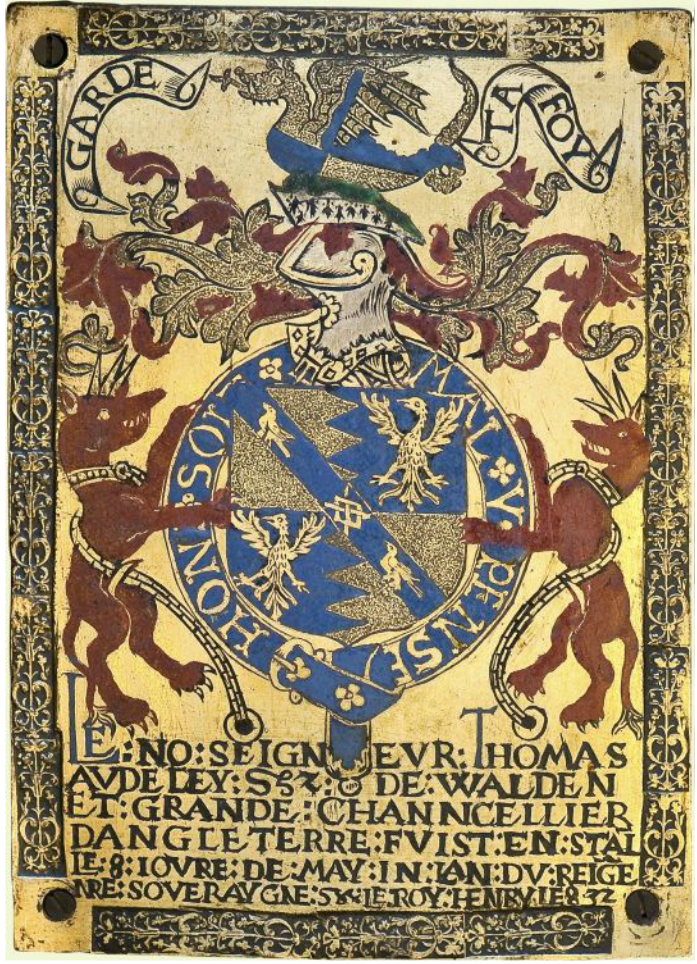
Garter stall plate of Thomas Audley, 1st Baron Audley of Walden, St George's Chapel, Windsor Castle. Inscribed: Le no(ble) Seigneur Thomas Audeley de Walden et Grande Channcellier d'Angleterre fuist enstallé 8 joure de May in l'an du reig(n)e n (ot)re soveraygne le Roy Henry le 8 32 ("The noble lord Thomas Audley of Walden and Grand Chancellor of England was installed on the 8th day of May in the 32nd year of the reign of our noble sovereign King Henry the Eighth")

Thomas Audley, 1st Baron Audley of Walden KG, PC, KS, JP (c. 1488 – 30 April 1544), was an English barrister and judge who served as Lord Chancellor of England from 1533 to 1544.

== Early life ==
Audley was born in Earls Colne, Essex, the son of Geoffrey Audley, and is believed to have studied at Buckingham College, Cambridge, now known as Magdalene College. He was educated for the law, entered the Inner Temple, was named town clerk of Colchester in 1514, and became Justice of the Peace for Essex in November 1520.

== Career in Parliament ==
In 1523 Audley was returned to Parliament for Essex, and represented this constituency in subsequent Parliaments. In 1527 he was Groom of the Chamber, and became a member of Wolsey's household. On the fall of the latter in 1529, he was made Chancellor of the Duchy of Lancaster, and the same year Speaker of the House of Commons, presiding over the famous assembly styled the Reformation Parliament, which abolished the papal jurisdiction. The same year he headed a deputation of the Commons to the king to complain of Bishop Fisher's speech against their proceedings. He interpreted the King's moral scruples to parliament concerning his marriage with Katherine of Aragon, and made himself the instrument of the King in the attack upon the clergy and the preparation of the Act of Supremacy.

In 1531 he had been made a serjeant-at-law and king's serjeant; and on 20 May 1532 he was knighted, and succeeded Sir Thomas More as Lord Keeper of the Great Seal, being appointed Lord Chancellor on 26 January 1533. He supported the king's divorce from Katherine and the marriage with Anne Boleyn; and presided at the trials of Fisher and More in 1535, at which his conduct and evident intention to secure a conviction has been criticised by some. Next year he was part of the trial of Anne Boleyn and her "lovers" for treason and adultery. The execution of the king's wife left him free to declare the king's daughter Princess Elizabeth a bastard, and for Henry to marry Anne's maid of honour, Jane Seymour. Audley was a witness to the queen's execution, and recommended to Parliament the new Act of Succession, which made Jane Seymour's issue legitimate.

In 1537 he condemned to death as traitors the rebels of the Pilgrimage of Grace. On 29 November 1538 he was created Baron Audley of Walden; and soon afterwards presided as Lord Steward at the trials of Henry Pole, Lord Montacute, and of the Marquess of Exeter. In 1539, inclining to the Protestant Reformation, he made himself the King's instrument in enforcing religious conformity, and in the passing of the Six Articles Act.

== Other activities ==
On 24 April 1540 he was made a Knight of the Garter, and subsequently managed the attainder of Thomas Cromwell, and the dissolution of Henry's marriage with Anne of Cleves. This was despite having previously been a strong ally of Cromwell. In 1542 he warmly supported the privileges of the Commons, but his conduct was inspired as usual by subservience to the court, which desired to secure a subsidy, and his opinion that the arrest was a flagrant contempt has been questioned by good authority.

He received several grants of monastic estates, including Holy Trinity Priory in Aldgate, London and Walden Abbey, Essex, where his grandson, Thomas Howard, 1st Earl of Suffolk, built Audley End, doubtless named after him. In 1542 he endowed and re-established Buckingham College, Cambridge, under the new name of the College of St. Mary Magdalene (commonly Magdalene College), and ordained in the statutes that his heirs, "the possessors of the late monastery of Walden" should be Visitors of Magdalene College in perpetuum. The power to appoint the Master of the College was vested in the Visitor until an amendment to the College Statutes in 2012. The arms of Magdalene are derived from his.

A Booke of Orders for the Warre both by Sea and Land (Harleian MS. 297, 144) is attributed to his authorship.

== Marriages and progeny ==
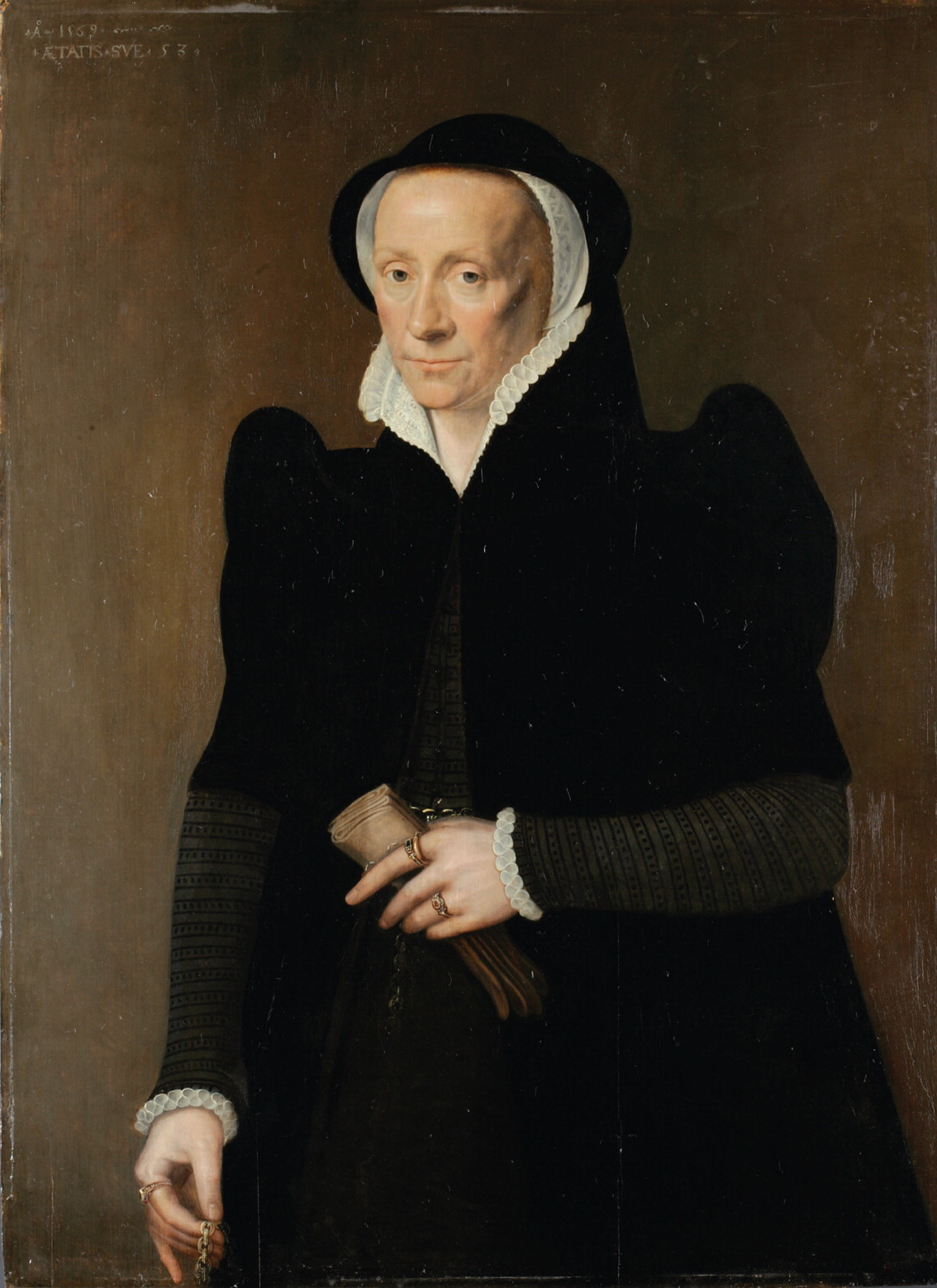
Elizabeth Grey, second wife of Thomas Audley, depicted in 1569

Lord Audley married twice:

- Firstly to Christina (or Margaret) Barnardiston, a daughter of Sir Thomas Barnardiston (died 1503), of Kedington, Suffolk;
- Secondly to Elizabeth Grey, third daughter of Thomas Grey, 2nd Marquess of Dorset, by whom he had two daughters, including:
  - Margaret Audley, who married as her second husband Thomas Howard, 4th Duke of Norfolk, by whom her eldest son was Thomas Howard, 1st Earl of Suffolk, 1st Baron Howard de Walden, created Baron Howard de Walden in 1597 and Earl of Suffolk in 1603.

== Death and burial ==
He resigned the great seal on 21 April 1544, and died on 30 April and was buried at Saffron Walden, where he had prepared for himself a splendid tomb. As he died without male progeny his barony became extinct at his death. One of his daughters, Margaret, married as her second husband Thomas Howard, 4th Duke of Norfolk. Their elder son Lord Thomas Howard was created Baron Howard de Walden in 1597 and Earl of Suffolk in 1603. St. Michael's Church, Berechurch in Essex has a monument to him in the Audley Chapel.

Political offices
| Preceded by Sir Thomas More | Speaker of the House of Commons; 1529 – 1533 | Succeeded by Sir Humphrey Wingfield |
| Preceded by Sir Thomas More | Lord Chancellor (Keeper of the Great Seal since 1532); 1533 – 1544 | Succeeded by The Earl of Southampton |
Peerage of England
| New creation | Baron Audley of Walden; 1538–1544 | Extinct |
