= Richard Sackville, 5th Earl of Dorset =

English peer and politician

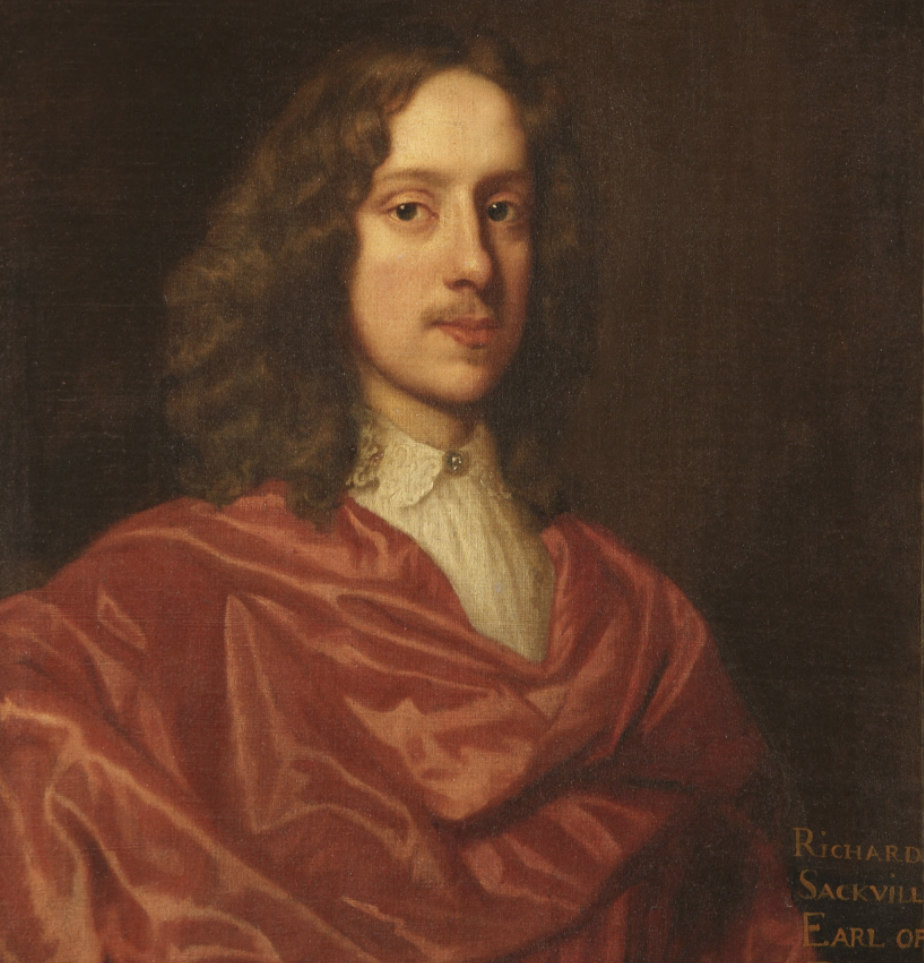
Sackville

Richard Sackville, 5th Earl of Dorset (16 September 1622 – 27 August 1677) was an English peer and politician.

== Background ==
He was born at Dorset House, the second of three children of Edward Sackville, 4th Earl of Dorset and Mary Curzon, daughter and heiress of Mary Leveson and Sir George Curzon of Croxall Hall, Derbyshire. His elder sister Mary died in 1632; his younger brother Edward participated in the English Civil War, and was captured and killed by Parliamentary forces in 1646.

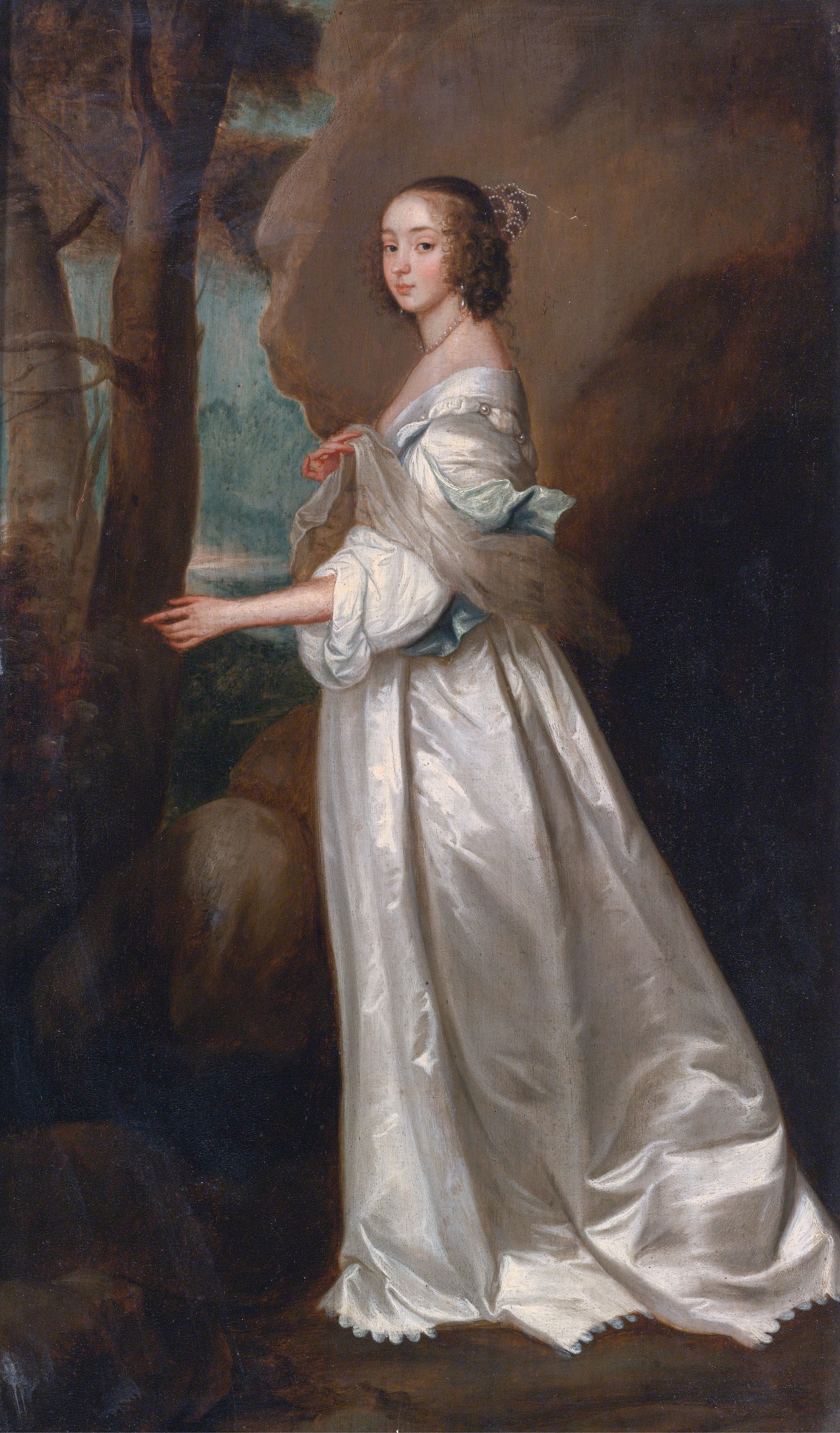
Frances Cranfield, Lady Buckhurst (1622–1687) (after Anthony van Dyck)

== Life ==
Sackville sat in the House of Commons, 1640–1643, as Lord Buckhurst, representing East Grinstead in Sussex; he was involved in the political events leading to the English Civil War, and was arrested by Parliament in 1642 and fined £1500 in 1644. After that point, however, he played no active role in the conflict. He resumed a political career in 1660; he sat in the new parliament or convention that managed the Restoration, and, among other posts, chaired the committee that was in charge of the reception of King Charles II. The new King appointed Sackville lord lieutenant of Middlesex in 1660. In the 1660s he was able to restore many of the possessions and privileges that his family had lost in the Interregnum.

Sackville was an occasional poet; a poem in mourning of Ben Jonson was included in the memorial volume Jonsonus Virbius (1638), published in the year after the poet laureate's death. John Aubrey reproduced a report that Sackville translated Corneille's Le Cid. Sackville was elected a fellow of the Royal Society in 1665.

== Family ==
For four decades he was married to Lady Frances Cranfield, daughter of Lionel Cranfield, 1st Earl of Middlesex; they had seven sons and six daughters. Their daughter Mary married Roger Boyle, 2nd Earl of Orrery, in 1665 and had issue. Another daughter Frances married George Lane, 1st Viscount Lanesborough and had issue. His eldest son, Charles Sackville, succeeded him as the 6th Earl of Dorset.

Parliament of England
Preceded by Robert Goodwin; Sir Henry Compton	Member of Parliament for East Grinstead; 1640–1643; With: Robert Goodwin	Succeeded by Robert Goodwin; John Baker
Honorary titles
English Interregnum	Lord Lieutenant of Middlesex jointly with The Earl of Berkshire; 1660–1662	Succeeded by The Duke of Albemarle
Preceded by The Earl of Northumberland	Lord Lieutenant of Sussex jointly with Lord Buckhurst; 1670–1677	Succeeded by The Earl of Dorset
Preceded by The Earl of Northumberland	Custos Rotulorum of Sussex; 1670–1677	Succeeded by The Earl of Dorset
Peerage of England
Preceded by Edward Sackville	Earl of Dorset; 1652–1677	Succeeded by Charles Sackville
