= Robert Sackville, 2nd Earl of Dorset =

English politician

Robert Sackville, 2nd Earl of Dorset (1561–1609) was an English aristocrat and politician, with humanist and commercial interests.

== Life ==
He was the eldest son of Thomas Sackville, 1st Earl of Dorset, by Cecily, daughter of Sir John Baker. His grandfather, Sir Richard Sackville, invited Roger Ascham to educate Robert with his own son, an incident in 1563 that Ascham introduced into his pedagogic work The Scholemaster (1570) as prompting the book. His tutor Claudius Hollyband dedicated to him the French language manuals The French Schoolemaster (1573) and The Frenche Littelton (1576), which would see a combined total of fifteen editions through the year 1609. He entered Hart Hall, Oxford, on 17 December 1576 at age 15, and graduated B.A. and M.A. on 3 June 1579; it appears from his father's will that he was also at New College.

He was admitted to the Inner Temple in 1580 but not called to the bar, and was elected to the House of Commons in 1585 as member for Sussex, aged 23, by his father's influence. In 1588 he sat for Lewes, but represented the county again in 1592–3, 1597–8, 1601, and 1604–8. He was a prominent member of the Commons, serving as a chairman of several committees. At the same time, he engaged in trading ventures and held a patent for the supply of ordnance.

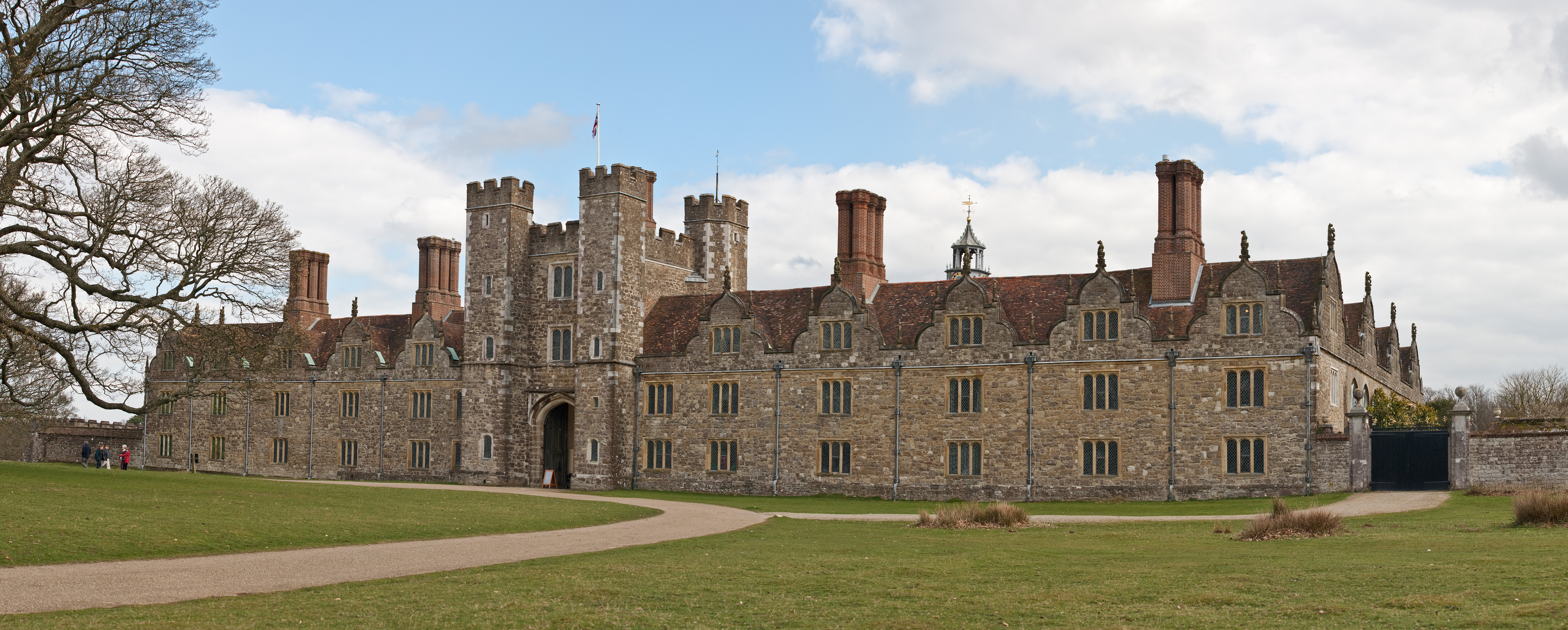
Knole House, Kent

He succeeded to the earldom of Dorset on the death of his father on 19 April 1608. He inherited from his father manors in Sussex, Essex, Kent, and Middlesex, the principal seats being Knole and Buckhurst.

== Death and legacy ==
Dorset survived his father less than a year, dying on 27 February 1609 at Dorset House, London. He was buried in the Sackville Chapel at Withyham, Sussex, and left money for the building and endowment of Sackville College, an almshouse at East Grinstead.

== Family ==
Dorset married first, in February 1580, Lady Margaret, by then the only surviving daughter of Thomas Howard, 4th Duke of Norfolk by his second wife, Margaret Audley, Duchess of Norfolk.

His wife's family had fallen into disgrace in 1572 following the involvement of her father, the 4th Duke of Norfolk, in Ridolfi plot to overthrow Elizabeth I, install Mary, Queen of Scots on the English throne and restore Catholicism in England. Norfolk was tried for treason and sentenced to death in January 1572, and then executed in June of that same year. Later Margaret would manage to recover part of her paternal family's inheritance.

Robert and Margaret had six children, including:

- Richard Sackville, 3rd Earl of Dorset (18 March 1589 – 28 March 1624)
- Edward Sackville, 4th Earl of Dorset (1591 – 17 July 1652)

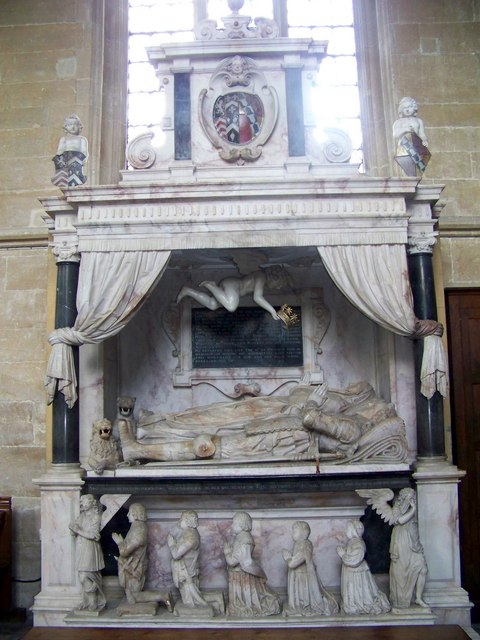
Monument to Anne Sackville and her second husband Sir Edward Lewis, Edington Priory Church, Wiltshire

- Anne (d.25 September 1664), married Sir Edward Seymour, eldest son of Edward Seymour, Viscount Beauchamp, and, secondly, Sir Edward Lewis (d.1630) by whom she had issue. Her monument with effigies of herself and her second husband survives in Edington Priory Church in Wiltshire.
- Cecily, married Sir Henry Compton

Lady Margaret died on 19 August 1591; Robert Southwell, who never met her, published in her honour, in 1596, Triumphs over Death, with dedicatory verses to her surviving children.

Dorset married, secondly, on 4 December 1592, Anne (d. 22 September 1618), daughter of Sir John Spencer of Althorp, and widow of, first, William Stanley, 3rd Baron Monteagle, and, secondly, Henry Compton, 1st Baron Compton. In 1608–9 Dorset found reason to complain of his second wife's misconduct, and was negotiating with Archbishop Richard Bancroft and Lord Ellesmere for a separation from her when he died.

== Notes ==
Political offices
| Preceded by The Earl of Nottingham; The Earl of Northumberland | Lord Lieutenant of Sussex; 1608–1609 | Vacant Title next held by The 3rd Earl of Dorset |
Peerage of England
| Preceded by Thomas Sackville | Earl of Dorset; 1608–1609 | Succeeded by Richard Sackville |
