= Charles Wyndham, 3rd Baron Leconfield =

British peer, army officer and political figure

The Right Honourable The Lord Leconfield GCVO JP
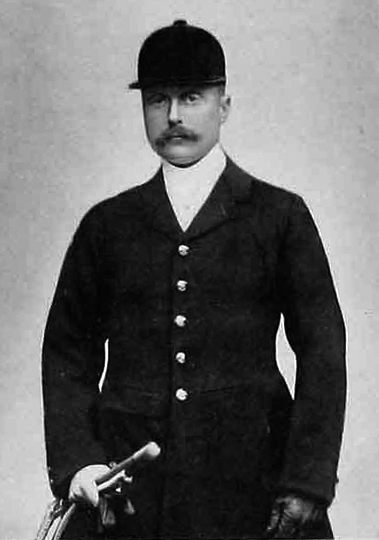
- Lord Leconfield, 1908

Lord Lieutenant of Sussex
- In office 1917–1949
- Preceded by: The 15th Duke of Norfolk
- Succeeded by: The 16th Duke of Norfolk

Member of the House of Lords
- In office 6 January 1901 – 16 April 1952
- Preceded by: The 2nd Baron Leconfield
- Succeeded by: The 4th Baron Leconfield

Personal details
- Born: Charles Henry Wyndham; 17 February 1872 Petworth, West Sussex, England
- Died: 16 April 1952 (aged 80) Petworth, West Sussex, England
- Spouse: Beatrice Violet Rawson

Military service
- Allegiance: United Kingdom
- Branch/service: British Army
- Years of service: 1892–1898; 1917–1918
- Rank: Honorary Colonel
- Unit: 1st Regiment of Life Guards
- Commands: Royal Sussex Volunteers
- Battles/wars: World War I

Arms of Wyndham, Baron Leconfield and Egremont: Azure, a chevron between three lion's heads erased or a bordure wavy of the last. These are the arms of Wyndham of Orchard Wyndham, differenced by a bordure wavy, for the illegitimacy of the 1st Baron Leconfield.

Charles Henry Wyndham, 3rd Baron Leconfield (17 February 1872 – 16 April 1952), was a British peer, army officer and political figure. He succeeded his father as third Baron Leconfield in 1901.

== Early life and education ==
Wyndham was born at the family estate, Petworth House, in Sussex. A direct descendant of Sir John Wyndham, he was the second but eldest surviving son of Henry Wyndham, 2nd Baron Leconfield, and Constance Evelyn Primrose, daughter of Archibald Primrose, Lord Dalmeny. His grandfather, George Wyndham, 1st Baron Leconfield, was the eldest illegitimate son and heir of George Wyndham, 3rd Earl of Egremont, from whom the family derived their considerable wealth.

He was educated at Winchester College.

== Military career ==
He served in the 1st Life Guards from 1892 to 1898 and was appointed a lieutenant of the Reserve on 27 January 1900. In 1901, during the Second Boer War, he became the commanding officer of the newly-reformed Sussex Yeomanry (originally raised at Petworth by the 3rd Earl of Egremont). Wyndham served and was wounded during the Second Boer War in 1900.

During World War I he rejoined the 1st Life Guards and commanded the Royal Sussex Volunteers from 1917 to 1918. In World War II, he was appointed Honorary Colonel of the 5th Battalion of the Border Regiment (representing Cumberland, in which he held significant lands), and of the 98th Surrey and Sussex Yeomanry. He served as Lord Lieutenant of Sussex between 1917 and 1949.

== Properties ==
Lord Leconfield inherited the family seat, Petworth House, as well as significant land in Cumberland, including Cockermouth Castle and Scafell Pike. In 1919, he placed Scafell Pike—the highest peak in England—under the custody of the National Trust in honour of the soldiers of the Lake District who served in World War I.

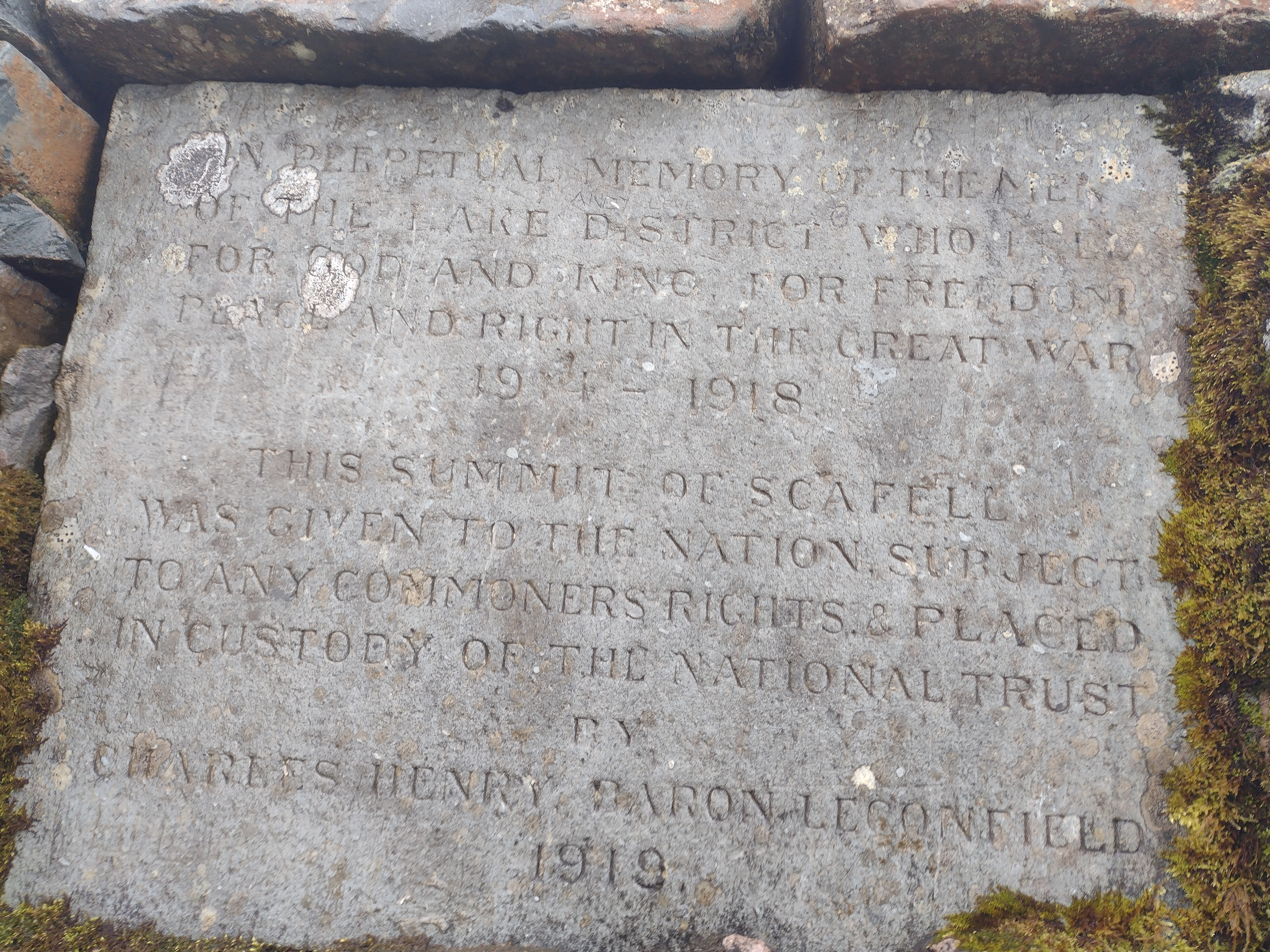
The plaque on Scafell Pike's summit commemorating both the soldiers of the Lake District that had served in WWI and Lord Leconfield himself.

Lord Leconfield also opened the state rooms and large art collection of Petworth House, his 17th-century mansion, to the public. In 1947, he gave the house and its 735-acre park to the National Trust.

== Later life ==
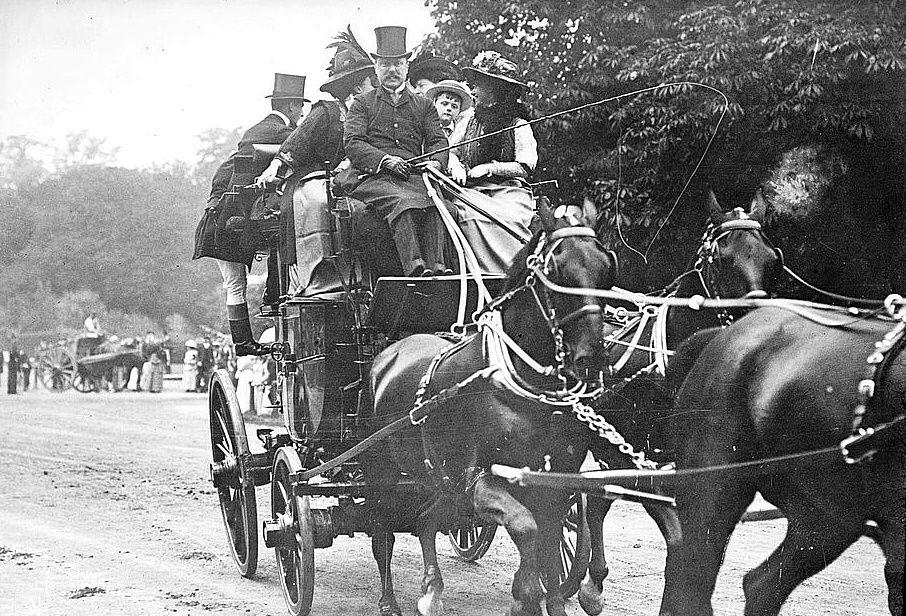
Lord Leconfield at the head of a horse-drawn coach

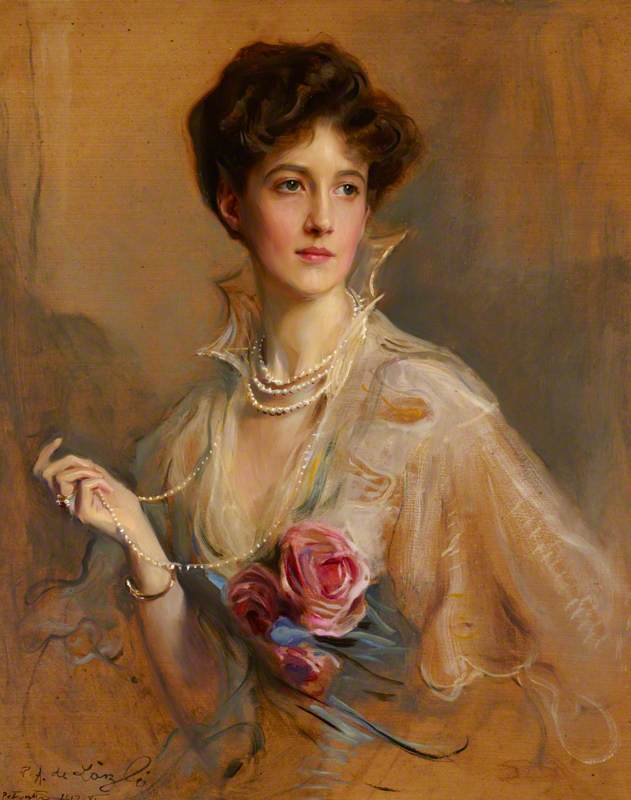
Violet Wyndham, Lady Leconfield

Lord Leconfield married (Beatrice) Violet Rawson, daughter of Colonel Richard Hamilton Rawson, in 1911. Wyndham had two adopted children, Peter and Elizabeth Geraldine Wyndham (born Betty Seymour).

He was a dedicated sportsman, a master of foxhounds, and served as president of the Marylebone Cricket Club for the 1927–1928 season. He also served as president of the Pratt's club in London.

In 1935 he was appointed Knight Grand Cross of the Royal Victorian Order for his services as a member of the Council of the Duchy of Lancaster and Lord Lieutenant of Sussex.

He died in April 1952, aged 80, after a lengthy illness. Wyndham was succeeded in the barony by his younger brother Hugh Wyndham (1877–1963), as his adopted son Peter was disqualified from inheriting his adoptive father's titles and estates. Wyndham left an estate of £2,136,439 (equivalent to £53,521,433 in 2025).

His adopted daughter Elizabeth Wyndham was a socialite and civil servant, born on 15 December 1922. She died on 13 May 2008, aged 85 in Chalfont St Giles, Buckinghamshire. As an accomplished polyglot, during the Second World War, she worked as a linguist in the British codebreaking department at Bletchley Park.

Honorary titles
Preceded by The Duke of Norfolk	Lord Lieutenant of Sussex; 1917–1949	Succeeded by The Duke of Norfolk
Peerage of the United Kingdom
Preceded by Henry Wyndham	Baron Leconfield; 1901–1952; Member of the House of Lords (1901–1952)	Succeeded by Hugh Wyndham
