= Thomas Howard, 1st Earl of Suffolk =

English sailor, politician, and courtier (1561–1626)

Admiral The Right Honourable The Earl of Suffolk KG PC
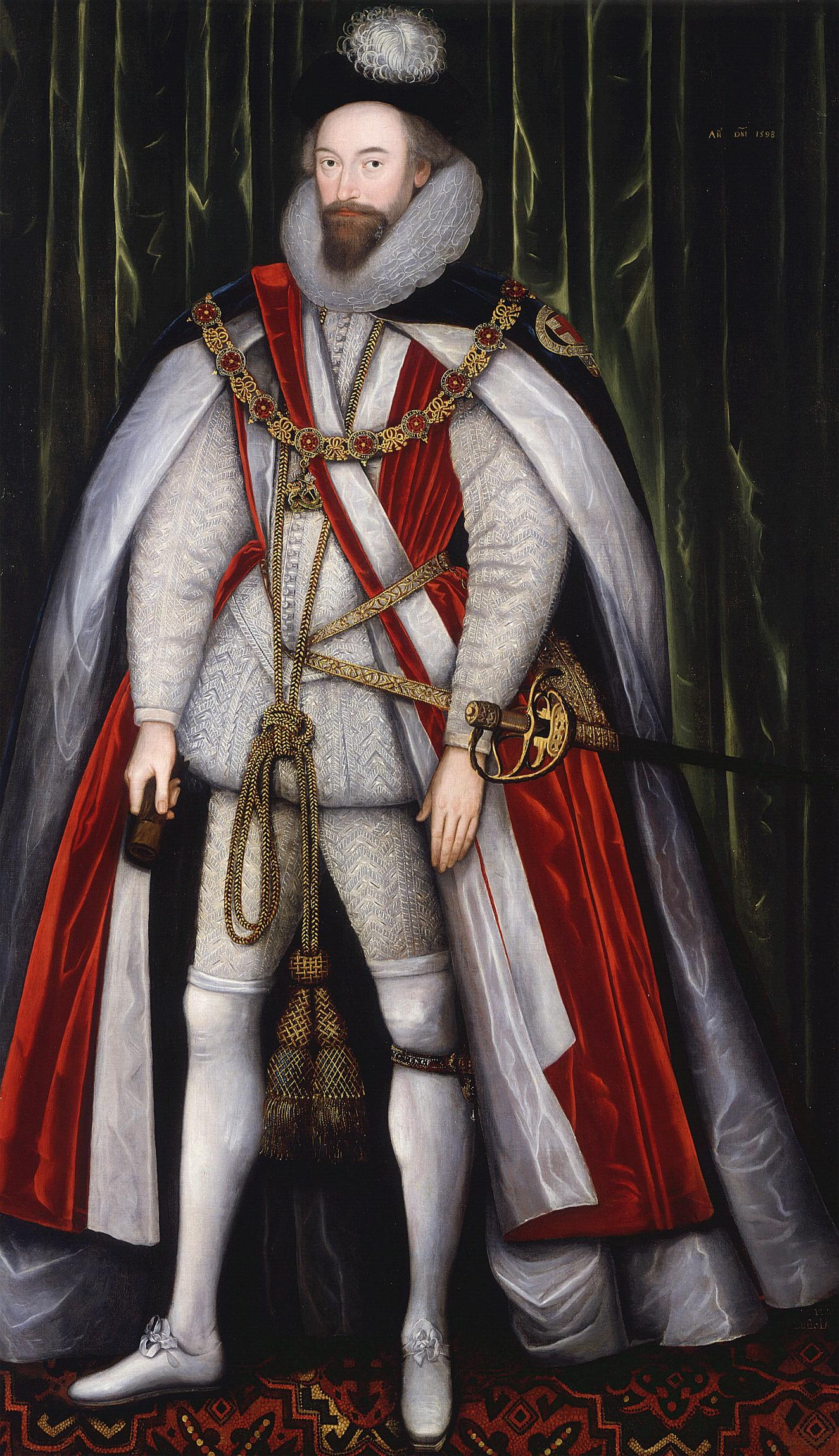

Lord High Treasurer
- In office 11 July 1614 – July 1618
- Preceded by: The Lord Ellesmere
- Succeeded by: George Abbot, Archbishop of Canterbury

Lord Chamberlain of the Household
- In office c. 1603 – c. 1614
- Preceded by: The Lord Hunsdon
- Succeeded by: The Earl of Somerset

Personal details
- Born: 24 August 1561
- Died: 28 May 1626 (aged 64)
- Resting place: St Mary the Virgin, Saffron Walden, Essex, England
- Spouse(s): Mary Dacre; Katherine Knyvet
- Children: Theophilus Howard, 2nd Earl of Suffolk; Elizabeth Howard; Robert Howard; Sir William Howard; Catherine Howard; Thomas Howard, 1st Earl of Berkshire; Frances Howard; Sir Charles Howard; Henry Howard; Edward Howard, 1st Baron Howard of Escrick; Margaret Howard
- Parents: Thomas Howard, 4th Duke of Norfolk (father); Margaret Audley (mother)

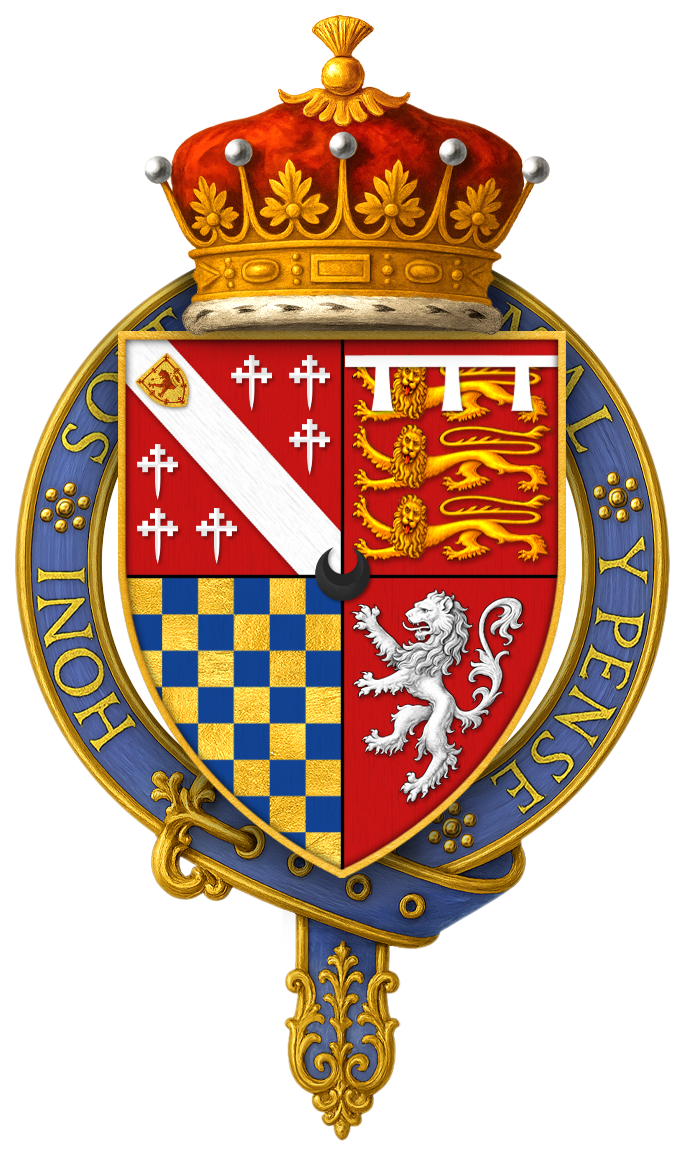
Coat of arms of Sir Thomas Howard, 1st Earl of Suffolk, KG. The crescent in the family coat of arms is because he was the second son

Thomas Howard, 1st Earl of Suffolk, KG, PC (24 August 1561 – 28 May 1626), of Audley End House in the parish of Saffron Walden in Essex, and of Suffolk House near Westminster, a member of the House of Howard, was the second son of Thomas Howard, 4th Duke of Norfolk, by his second wife Margaret Audley, the daughter and eventual sole heiress of Thomas Audley, 1st Baron Audley of Walden, of Audley End.

== Early life and marriages ==
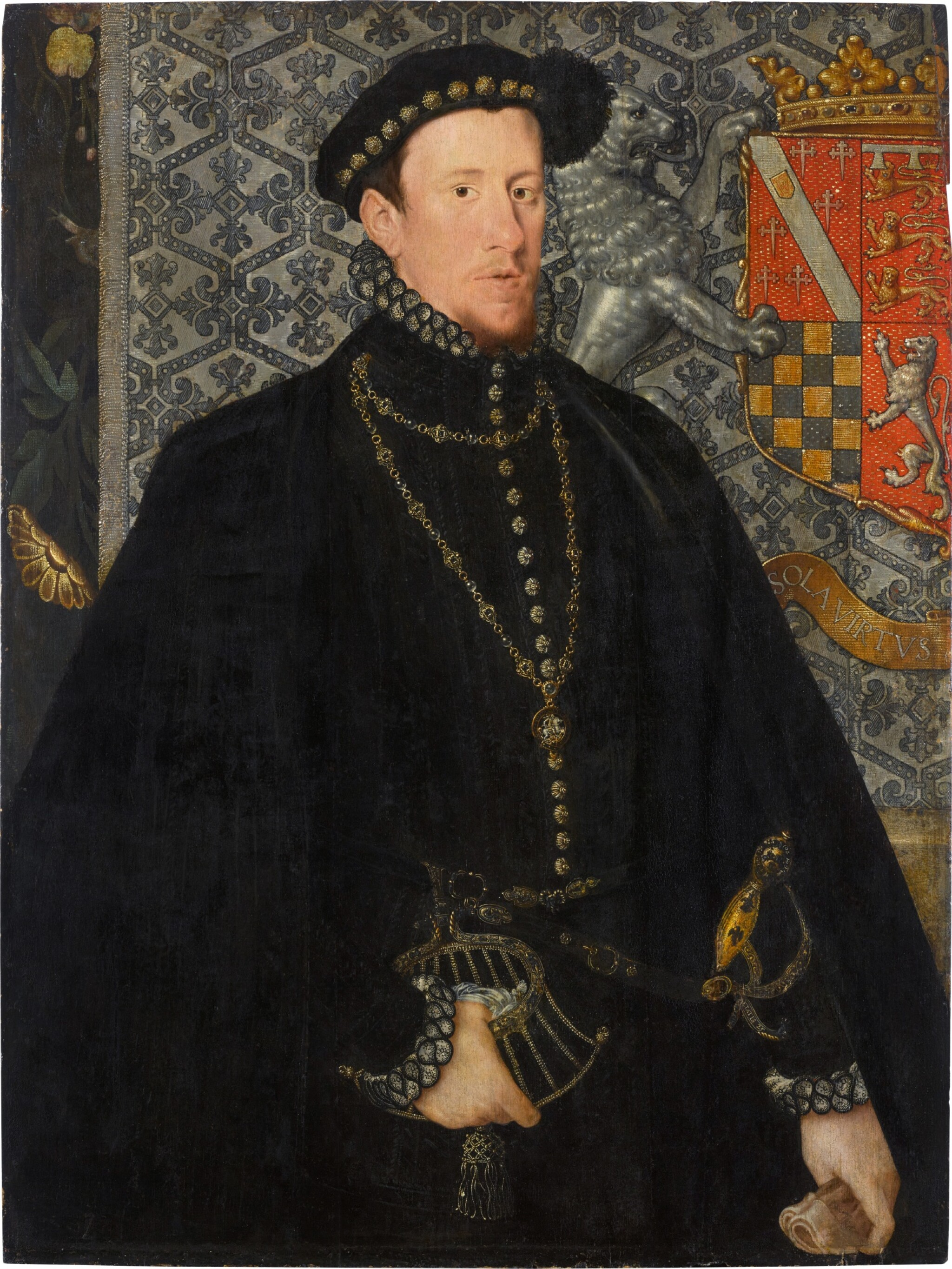
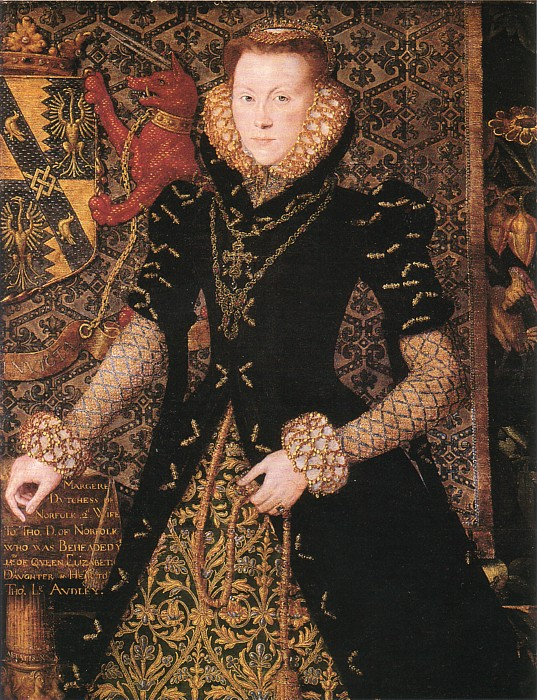
Thomas Howard, 4th Duke of Norfolk, and Margaret Audley, Thomas' parents

Thomas was born at Audley End on 24 August 1561, the second of four children Thomas Howard, 4th Duke of Norfolk, had by his second wife, Margaret Audley. His older sister was Elizabeth Howard, who died in infancy, and his younger siblings were Margaret and William. His maternal grandparents were Thomas Audley, 1st Baron Audley of Walden, and his second wife Elizabeth Grey. His paternal grandparents were Henry Howard, Earl of Surrey, and his wife Frances de Vere. On his father's side, Thomas had an older half-brother, Philip Howard, who would later become Earl of Arundel who in turn was also a second cousin of Thomas (Philip's mother, Mary FitzAlan and Margaret Audley were first cousins).

When his mother died in January 1564, Thomas inherited the manor of Saffron Walden and other Audley family properties.

Thomas's father, a Roman Catholic with a Protestant education, was arrested in 1569 for being involved in intrigues against Queen Elizabeth, mainly due to the Duke's intention to marry Mary I Stewart, Queen of Scots. Although he was released in August 1570, a few months later he became involved in the Ridolfi plot to overthrow Elizabeth, install Mary on the English throne and restore Catholicism, and was arrested again in September 1571, when his participation in the plot was discovered. Norfolk was tried for high treason and sentenced to death in January 1572. He was executed in June of that same year, when Thomas was almost eleven years old. After his father's death, Thomas and his siblings Philip, William and Margaret were left in the care of their uncle Henry Howard, who also took charge of their education. During this time, Thomas and his siblings lived with their uncle at Audley End. Due to his father's execution, much of his paternal family's property was forfeit, although Thomas, his younger siblings, and his older half-brother Philip were able to recover some of the forfeited estates.

His father, while imprisoned in the Tower awaiting execution, urged Thomas to marry his stepsister Mary Dacre, the daughter of Thomas Dacre, 4th Baron Dacre and Elizabeth Leybourne, the duke's third wife. He did so; but Mary died, childless, in April 1578 at Walden.

In or before 1582, Howard remarried, his second wife being Katherine Knyvet, widow of Richard Rich, son of Robert Rich, 2nd Baron Rich. A noted beauty, she was also the eldest daughter and heiress of her father, Sir Henry Knyvet of Charlton. She survived her husband, dying in 1633.

== Family ==
- Theophilus Howard, 2nd Earl of Suffolk (13 August 1582 – 3 June 1640) married: Elizabeth Home, and had issue
- Elizabeth Howard (c. 1583 – 17 April 1658) married: (1) William Knollys, 1st Earl of Banbury, and had issue (2) Edward Vaux, 4th Baron Vaux of Harrowden (some say that Elizabeth's and William's children were illegitimate)
- Sir Robert Howard (1598–1653) (1) mistress Frances Villers and had issue Robert Danvers; (2) married: Catherine Nevill
- Sir William Howard (1586 – before 1672)
- Thomas Howard, 1st Earl of Berkshire (8 October 1587 – 16 July 1669) married: Elizabeth Cecil, and had issue
- Catherine Howard (c. 1588–1673) married: William Cecil, 2nd Earl of Salisbury, and had issue
- Frances Howard (31 May 1590 – 1632) married: (1) Robert Devereux, 3rd Earl of Essex (2) Robert Carr, 1st Earl of Somerset, and had issue
- Sir Charles Howard (1591 – 21 June 1626), married Mary Fitz(john). Their daughter Elizabeth was a maid of honour and performed in the masque The Shepherd's Paradise.
- Henry Howard (1592–1616), married Elizabeth Bassett and had issue. In September 1613 he travelled to Veere to fight a duel with the Earl of Essex, but the courtier Henry Gibb prevented the combat.
- Edward Howard, 1st Baron Howard of Escrick (died 24 April 1675), married Mary Boteler daughter of John Boteler and Elizabeth Villiers, on 30 November 1623, and had issue.
- Margaret Howard (c. 1599–1608)
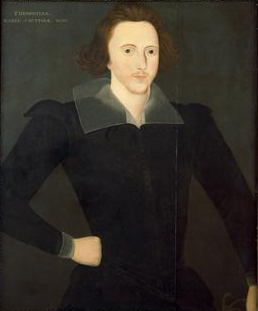
Theophilus Howard

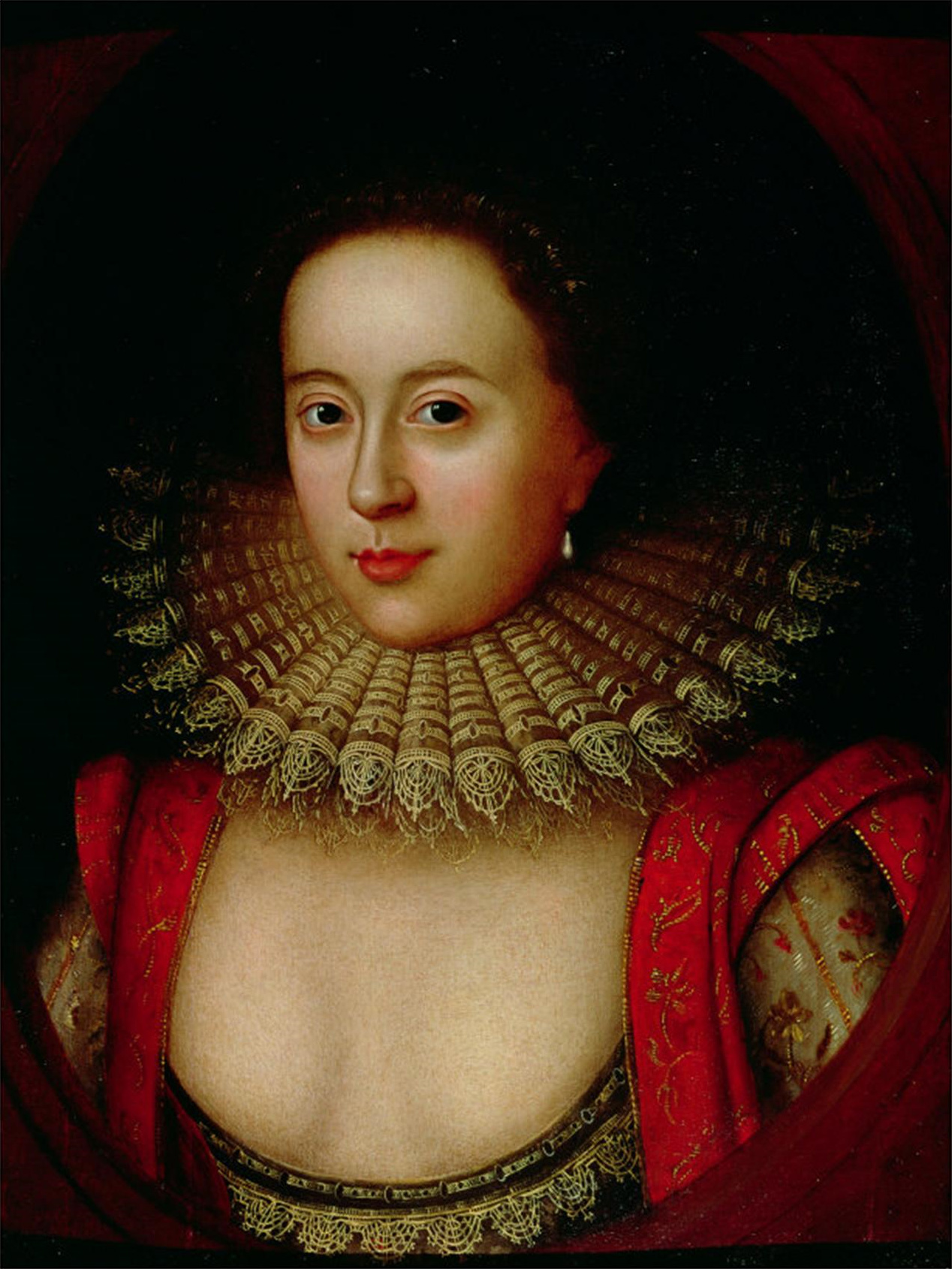
Frances Howard

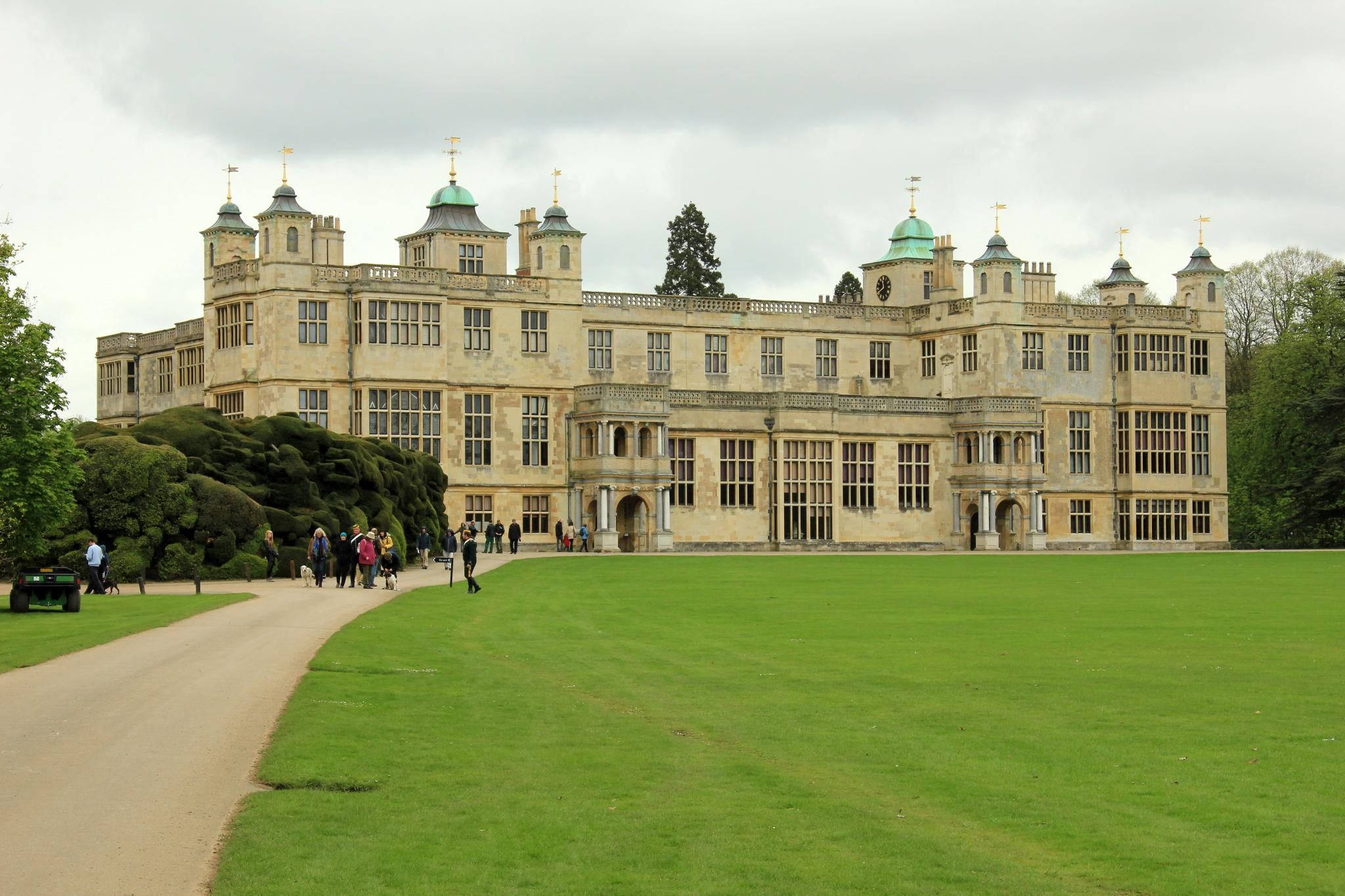
Audley End, entrance

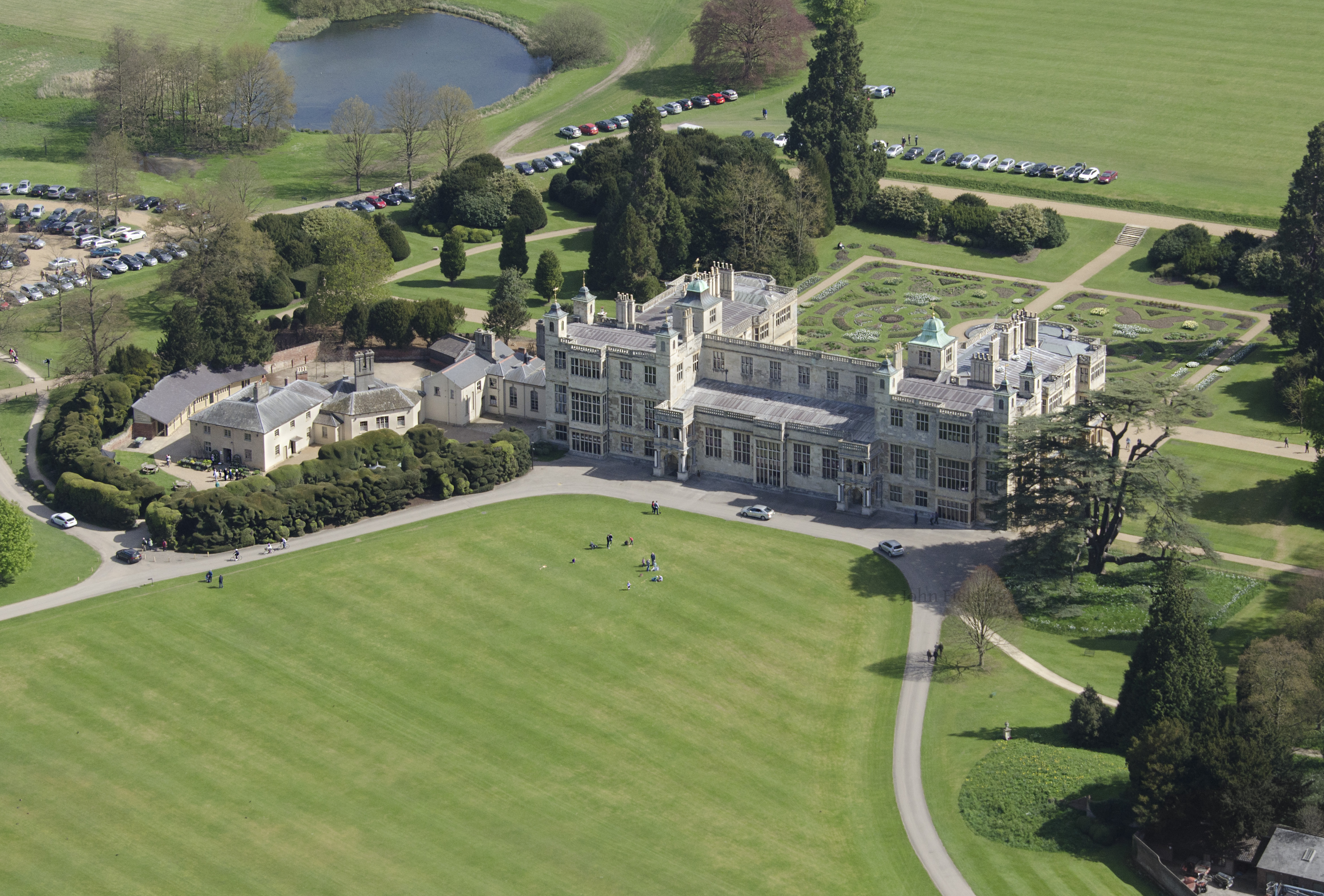
Audley End, aerial

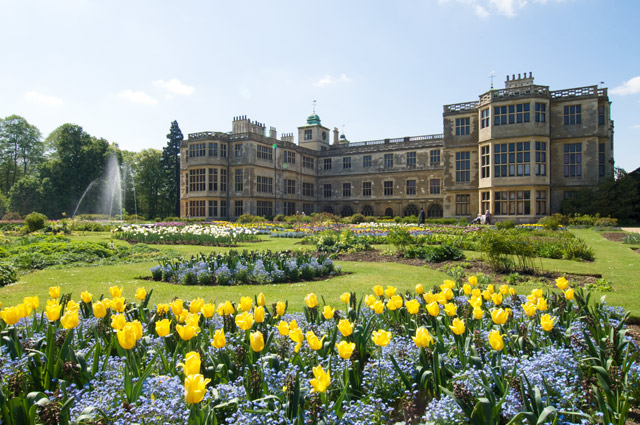
Audley End, rear

== Naval exploits ==
In December 1584, he was restored in blood as Lord Thomas Howard. Lord Thomas commanded the Golden Lion in the attack on the Spanish Armada. On 25 July 1588, the Golden Lion was one of the three ships that counter-attacked the Spanish galleasses protecting the Saint Anne. He was knighted the next day aboard Ark Royal by his kinsman, Admiral Lord Howard of Effingham.

In 1591, he was sent with a squadron to the Azores which was to waylay the Spanish treasure fleets from America. However, one fleet reached Spain before his arrival, and the second would not arrive in the islands until September. Forced by the long delay to land his sick and repair his ships, he was barely able to re-ballast and get to sea off Flores in time when his scouts reported an arriving fleet. To his horror, this proved to be, not the treasure fleet, but a powerful Spanish force dispatched from Ferrol to destroy his squadron. All of Howard's fleet escaped, by the barest of margins, except Revenge, commanded by the squadron's vice-admiral, Sir Richard Grenville. Revenge, some distance from the remainder of the fleet, attempted to break through the Castilian Squadron and was forced to surrender after a long fight, in which Revenge was virtually destroyed and Grenville mortally wounded.

In 1596, Howard served as vice-admiral of the expedition against Cádiz, which defeated a Spanish fleet and captured the town. Favoured by Queen Elizabeth, he was installed as a Knight of the Garter in April 1597, and in June sailed with the unsuccessful expedition to the Azores, which he had partly funded.

== Political career ==
He was seriously ill in the autumn of 1597, and was created Baron Howard de Walden by writ of summons. While he recovered from his illness, he was unable to attend Parliament until January 1598. On 2 February 1598, he was admitted an honorary member of Gray's Inn. In 1599, he commanded the fleet in The Downs; in that same year, he became an admiral. He was appointed Constable of the Tower of London on 13 February 1601 after the revolt of the Earl of Essex, and was one of the commission who tried Essex and Southampton. Still active in privateering ventures, he never obtained significant profit from them. At this time, he was also sworn High Steward of Cambridge University, and would hold the post until 1614. (He received an MA from Cambridge in 1605.)

A friend of Sir Robert Cecil, he became acting Lord Chamberlain at the close of 1602, and entertained the Queen at the Charterhouse, towards the end of her life in January 1603. Under James I, Howard immediately entered the King's favour, being appointed Lord Chamberlain on 6 April 1603 and a Privy Counsellor on 7 April. Later that year, on 21 July 1603, he was created Earl of Suffolk. He was also appointed a commissioner for creating Knights of the Bath, and from 1604 to 1618 a commissioner for the Earl Marshalcy. He was appointed Lord Lieutenant of Suffolk in 1605, having several years earlier been made Lord Lieutenant of Cambridgeshire.

Suffolk accepted a gift from the Spanish ambassador negotiating the peace treaty of 1604, but his countess proved a more valuable informant and Catholic sympathiser. Avaricious, she accepted an annual pension of £1000 from the Spanish. While Suffolk was less pro-Spanish and pro-Catholic than his wife, she was felt to dominate her husband in matters of politics, a circumstance which would later bring him to grief.

By 1605, Cecil, now Earl of Salisbury, Suffolk, the Earl of Northampton, and the Earl of Worcester were James's principal privy counsellors. Suffolk and Salisbury were both privy to the communications made by Lord Monteagle revealing the existence of the Gunpowder Plot, and Suffolk examined the cellar, spotting the brushwood concealing the gunpowder. Later that evening, the Keeper of the Palace, Sir Thomas Knyvet (Suffolk's brother-in-law) made further search, revealing the gunpowder, and the plot collapsed. Suffolk was one of those commissioned to investigate and try the plotters.

Numbered by James as one of his "trinity of knaves" (with Salisbury and Northampton), he was nonetheless thought loyal and reliable to the King. By 1607, work was completed on Charlton Park, a house which is still home to his descendants. In December 1608, Salisbury's eldest son and heir, William married Suffolk's third daughter, Catharine. Salisbury, who died in 1612, praised Suffolk's friendship in his will; and upon his death, Suffolk was appointed one of the Lords of the Treasury. Though he disliked Sir Robert Carr, the royal favourite, Suffolk supported his daughter Frances' desire to divorce her husband, the Earl of Essex to marry him. She did so in December 1613, shortly after his creation as Earl of Somerset.

On 8 July 1614, Suffolk was appointed Chancellor of the University of Cambridge, replacing his kinsman Northampton, and on 11 July 1614 was made Lord High Treasurer. His new son-in-law, Somerset, replaced him as Lord Chamberlain, and Suffolk and his family now dominated the court.

In 1615, however, Suffolk's fall began. James had become deeply infatuated with Sir George Villiers, and Suffolk's daughter Frances, now Countess of Somerset, was implicated in the poisoning of Sir Thomas Overbury. Suffolk was accused by James of complicity with Somerset in trying to suppress the investigation of the crime, but successfully weathered the storm. However, Suffolk then made the mistake of attempting to undermine the rising power of Villiers by grooming another handsome young man to succeed him in James's favour. Completely unsuccessful, this only provoked a counterattack by Villiers, now (1618) Marquess of Buckingham, upon Suffolk's conduct as Lord High Treasurer.

Suffolk's finances were always in a perilous state. His early privateering and naval ventures nearly bankrupted him, despite some financial help from Queen Elizabeth. Under James, the situation was somewhat eased by his preferment at court, which gave him board and lodging and valuable emoluments, and the regrant of some of the sequestered estates of his father. Some of this he invested in land in East Anglia, and he further benefited from a series of customs farms and bequests from relatives. He had been forced to sell his London residence, the Charterhouse, in 1611, but this was replaced in 1614 when he inherited the Earl of Northampton's house at Charing Cross. Suffolk added to his own troubles with extravagant building programmes. Audley End House, built from 1603 to 1616, was the largest private house in England. He also added an expensive new wing to Charing Cross, and his wife built Charlton Park on the Knyvett estates she had inherited. Suffolk's children were also well provided for. He spent considerable sums to keep up their profile at court, and provided generous marriage portions to improve their matches. While this strategy was successful, it generated crushing debts for him, owing £40,000 in bonds and mortgages by 1618. His appointment as Lord High Treasurer in 1614 provided the opportunity to ameliorate his financial position through selling patronage and through deals with customs farmers, although it did not completely relieve his debts. It was also to prove the instrument of his downfall.

== Arrest and fall ==
Through the agency of Buckingham, James was made aware of Suffolk's misconduct in the Treasury, particularly allegations that Lady Suffolk harassed creditors of the crown, and extorted bribes from them before they could obtain payment. Suffolk was suspended from the Treasurership in July 1618. Early in 1619, his wife suffered an attack of smallpox which destroyed her famous beauty, and Suffolk himself pleaded ill health in an attempt to avoid trial. These efforts failed: in October 1619, he, his wife, and their crony Sir John Bingley, Remembrancer of the Exchequer were prosecuted on a variety of counts of corruption in the Court of Star Chamber. Sir Francis Bacon, the prosecutor, compared Lady Suffolk to an exchange woman keeping shop while her apprentice, Bingley, cried "What d'ye lack?" outside. On 13 November 1619, they were found guilty on all counts. A fine of £30,000 was imposed, and they were sentenced to imprisonment at the King's pleasure.

After ten days, Suffolk and his wife were released and appealed to Buckingham to intercede for them. Although Suffolk further irritated James by legal manoeuvres to avoid seizure of his property, Buckingham was willing to be magnanimous to his rival now that his power had been destroyed. Buckingham obtained for Suffolk an audience with the King, and the fine was subsequently remitted except for £7,000. In 1623, Suffolk's youngest son Edward married Buckingham's niece, Mary Boteler. While Suffolk never again rose to high office, he was active in the Lords and served twice as a commissioner of ecclesiastical causes. He died at Charing Cross on 28 May 1626 and was buried on 4 June at Saffron Walden.

Political offices
Vacant Title last held by The Lord North	Lord Lieutenant of Cambridgeshire; 1602–1626	Succeeded by The Earl of Suffolk
Vacant Title last held by The Lord Hunsdon	Lord Lieutenant of Suffolk; 1605–1626	Succeeded by The Earl of Suffolk
Preceded by The Viscount Howard of Bindon	Lord Lieutenant of Dorset with The Earl of Salisbury 1611–1612; 1611–1626	Succeeded by The Earl of Suffolk
Preceded by The Lord Hunsdon	Lord Chamberlain; 1603–1614	Succeeded by The Earl of Somerset
Preceded by In commission (First Lord: The Lord Ellesmere)	Lord High Treasurer; 1614–1618	Succeeded by In commission (First Lord: George Abbot)
Preceded by The Earl of Northumberland	Captain of the Gentlemen Pensioners; 1615–1616	Succeeded by Lord Howard de Walden
Preceded by Sir Thomas Mildmay	Custos Rotulorum of Essex bef. 1621–1624	Succeeded by Lord Howard de Walden
Preceded by Sir Robert Jermyn	Custos Rotulorum of Suffolk bef. 1621–1624	Succeeded by Lord Howard de Walden
Academic offices
Preceded by The Earl of Northampton	Chancellor of the University of Cambridge; 1614–1626	Succeeded by The Duke of Buckingham
Peerage of England
New creation	Earl of Suffolk; 1603–1626	Succeeded by Theophilus Howard
New creation	Baron Howard de Walden (descended by acceleration); 1597–1610	Succeeded by Theophilus Howard
