= Mary Sackville =

English royal governess

The Countess of Dorset
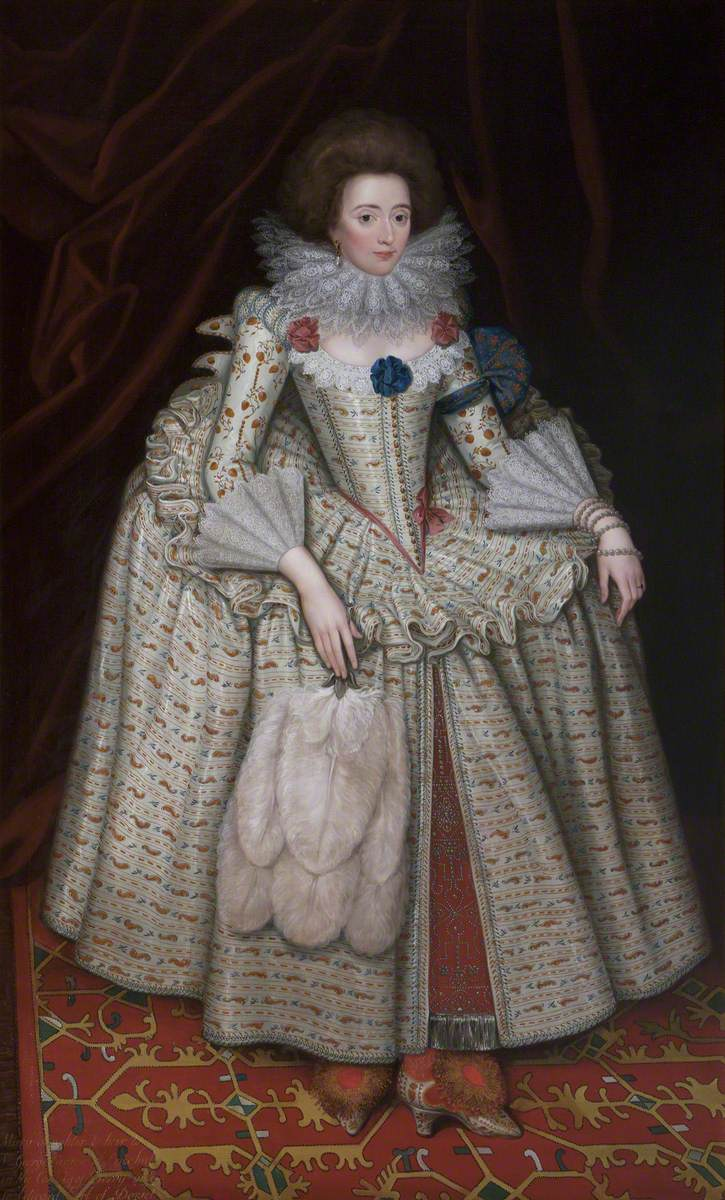
- The Countess of Dorset by William Hamilton (after William Larkin)
- Born: Mary Curzon c.1586 Trentham, England
- Died: 1645
- Spouse: Edward Sackville, 4th Earl of Dorset
- Issue: Mary Sackville; Richard Sackville, 5th Earl of Dorset; Edward Sackville
- Father: Sir George Curzon of Croxhall, Derbyshire
- Mother: Mary Leveson
- Occupation: Royal governess

Mary Sackville, Countess of Dorset (née Curzon) (c.1586 – 1645) was an English royal governess to the Tudor family, her duties involved the upbringing of the princes and princesses during the turbulent lead-up to the English Civil War. Her payment ensured that Knole House remained in the Dorset (Sackville) family.

== Life ==
Mary was born in Trentham and baptised in December 1586. She was the daughter and heiress of Sir George Curzon of Croxhall, Derbyshire. Her father created a contract with the grandfather of Edward Sackville, 4th Earl of Dorset that they should be married.

Croxall Hall passed to the Sackville family, The Earls, and later, Dukes of Dorset, following the death of Sir George Curzon who was the last male of his line in 1622. Mary as his heir brought the property through her marriage to Edward Sackville, 4th Earl of Dorset in 1612.

In 1628 her husband was made lord chamberlain of Queen Henrietta Maria and in 1630 she was appointed to the governess of Charles, Prince of Wales, and James, Duke of York, for a term of twelve years. She succeeded Jane Ker, Countess of Roxburghe who was removed because she was a Catholic. On 20 July 1643 she received charge of the younger children, Henry, duke of Gloucester, and his sister Elizabeth, and was allowed £600 a year, with Knole House and Dorset House, in recognition of her services.

== Death, funeral and legacy ==
In 1645 she died, just as she was about to be relieved of her duties, and, as a reward for her ‘godly and conscientious care and pains,’ received a public funeral in Westminster Abbey.

== Private life ==
Her daughter, Mary, died young, on 30 October 1632. Her son Richard became the fifth earl. Another son, Edward, was wounded at Newbury on 20 September 1643. He married Bridget, baroness Norreys, daughter of Edward Wray, and soon after he was taken prisoner by parliamentary soldiers at Kidlington, and killed at Chawley in the parish of Cumnor, near Oxford, on 11 April 1646.
