= Dorset House =

Dorset House may refer to:

== England ==
- Dorset House, Bristol, historic building in Bristol
- Dorset House, Marylebone, apartment block in Westminster, London
- Dorset House, London, building in Salisbury Square, London
- Dorset House, Oxfordshire, large house in Oxford
- Dorset House School, preparatory school in West Sussex

== Other uses ==
- The Dorset House, museum building in Vermont, United States
