= Lady Margaret Sackville (1562–1591) =

Margaret Sackville
- Born: c. 1562
- Died: 19 August 1591 (aged 28-29)
- Noble family: Howard (by birth); Sackville (by marriage)
- Spouse: Robert Sackville, 2nd Earl of Dorset
- Issue: Anne Sackville; Richard Sackville, 3rd Earl of Dorset; Edward Sackville, 4th Earl of Dorset; Cecily Sackville
- Parents: Thomas Howard, 4th Duke of Norfolk; Margaret Audley
- Religion: Roman Catholicism

Lady Margaret Sackville (c. 1562 – 19 August 1591), formerly Lady Margaret Howard, was the wife of Robert Sackville, 2nd Earl of Dorset.

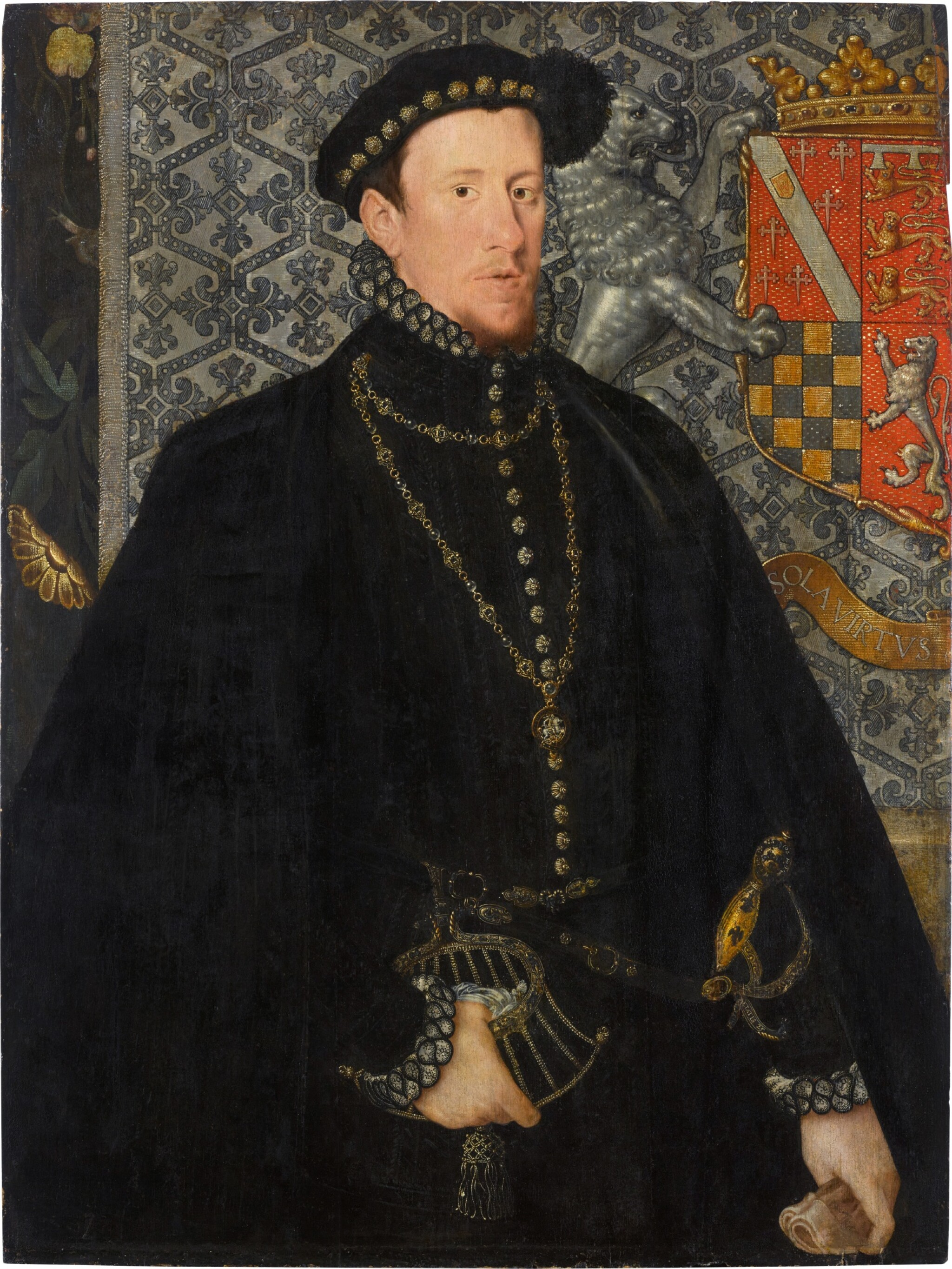
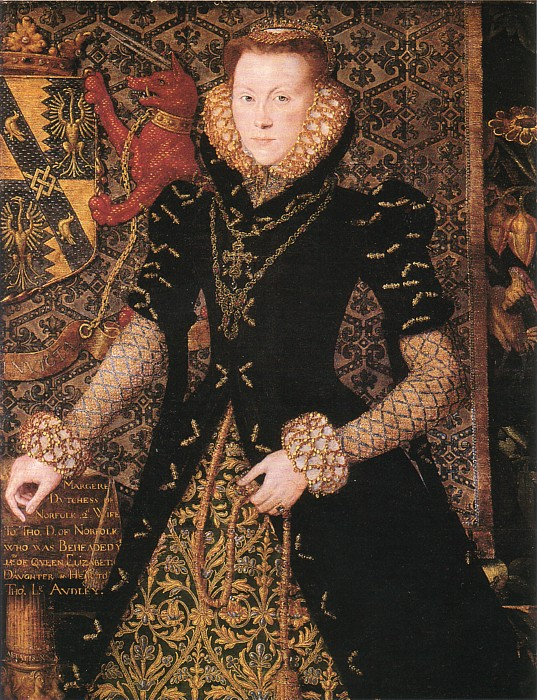
Thomas Howard, 4th Duke of Norfolk and Margaret Audley, Margaret's parents

== Early life ==
Margaret Howard was born in about 1562, being the third of four children Thomas Howard, 4th Duke of Norfolk had by his second wife, Margaret Audley. In keeping with family tradition, she was a devout Roman Catholic. Her half-brother, Philip, died while imprisoned by Queen Elizabeth, and was later canonised as a saint in the Catholic Church.

Her mother died in January 1564, while Margaret was still a young child; and shortly after her mother's death, her father married his third wife, Elizabeth Leyburne.

When his father was principal commissioner at the Conference held at York in October 1568 to determine the judicial and political situation of Mary, Queen of Scots, the Scottish statesman William Maitland of Lethington met privately with Norfolk, where he suggested to the Duke the possibility of a future marriage between Margaret and the infant King James VI, Mary's only surviving son, as well as the marriage between Norfolk and the former Scottish Queen. Howard, a Catholic with a Protestant education, was arrested in 1569 for being involved in intrigues against Queen Elizabeth, mainly because of the Duke's intention to marry Mary. Although he was released in August 1570, months later he became involved in the Ridolfi plot to overthrow Elizabeth, free and install Mary of Scots on the English throne and restore Catholicism, and was arrested again in September 1571, when his involvement in the plot was discovered. Norfolk was tried for high treason and then sentenced to death in January 1572; He was executed in June of that same year, when Margaret was nine or ten years old.

After their father's death, Margaret and her brothers Philip, Thomas and William were placed in the care of their uncle, Henry Howard, who also took charge of their education. During this time, Margaret and her brothers lived with their uncle at Audley End, Essex, one of his family's estates. Due to her father's execution, much of her paternal family's property was forfeited, although Margaret, her brothers, and her older half-brother Philip were able to recover some of the forfeited estates.

== Marriage and later life ==
In February 1580, Margaret married Robert Sackville. Her husband, who was from an aristocratic family, began to train in law as a member of the Inner Temple, but was not called to the bar. In 1585 he was elected to parliament for Sussex, and became a prominent member of the Commons.

In 1585, Margaret visited her sister-in-law, Anne Dacre, Countess of Arundel in Essex; The Countess of Arundel's movements were restricted due to the recent imprisonment of her husband, the Earl, in the Tower of London. Lady Margaret was under instructions from the Queen not to remain at the countess's home for more than one night. Both women were heavily pregnant and Lady Margaret went into labour during the visit, giving birth successfully.

The children of Robert and Margaret Sackville included:

- Anne (1586 – 25 September 1664), who was married twice: first to Sir Edward Seymour, eldest son of Edward Seymour, Viscount Beauchamp, and, second, to Sir Edward Lewis, by whom she had children. A memorial to her, with effigies of herself and her second husband (d. 1630), stands in Edington Priory Church, Wiltshire.
- Richard Sackville, 3rd Earl of Dorset (1589–1624)
- Edward Sackville, 4th Earl of Dorset (1591–1652)
- Cecily, married Sir Henry Compton, and had children

Lady Margaret died suddenly on 19 August 1591, at Knole, Kent, a property which had been granted to her husband's father by Queen Elizabeth during the 1560s. Robert Southwell's Triumphs over Death (published in 1596, after the poet's execution) was dedicated to her and her surviving children; it was supposedly written and sent to her half-brother, the Earl of Arundel, in prison, to comfort him.

Because Lady Margaret died before her husband inherited the earldom of Dorset, she never became countess. The year after her death, her husband married the twice-widowed Anne, daughter of Sir John Spencer of Althorp. He left instructions in his will that he should be buried at Withyham, East Sussex, "as near to my first dearly beloved wife ... as can be".
