= Margaret Audley, Duchess of Norfolk =

English noblewoman

Her Grace The Duchess of Norfolk
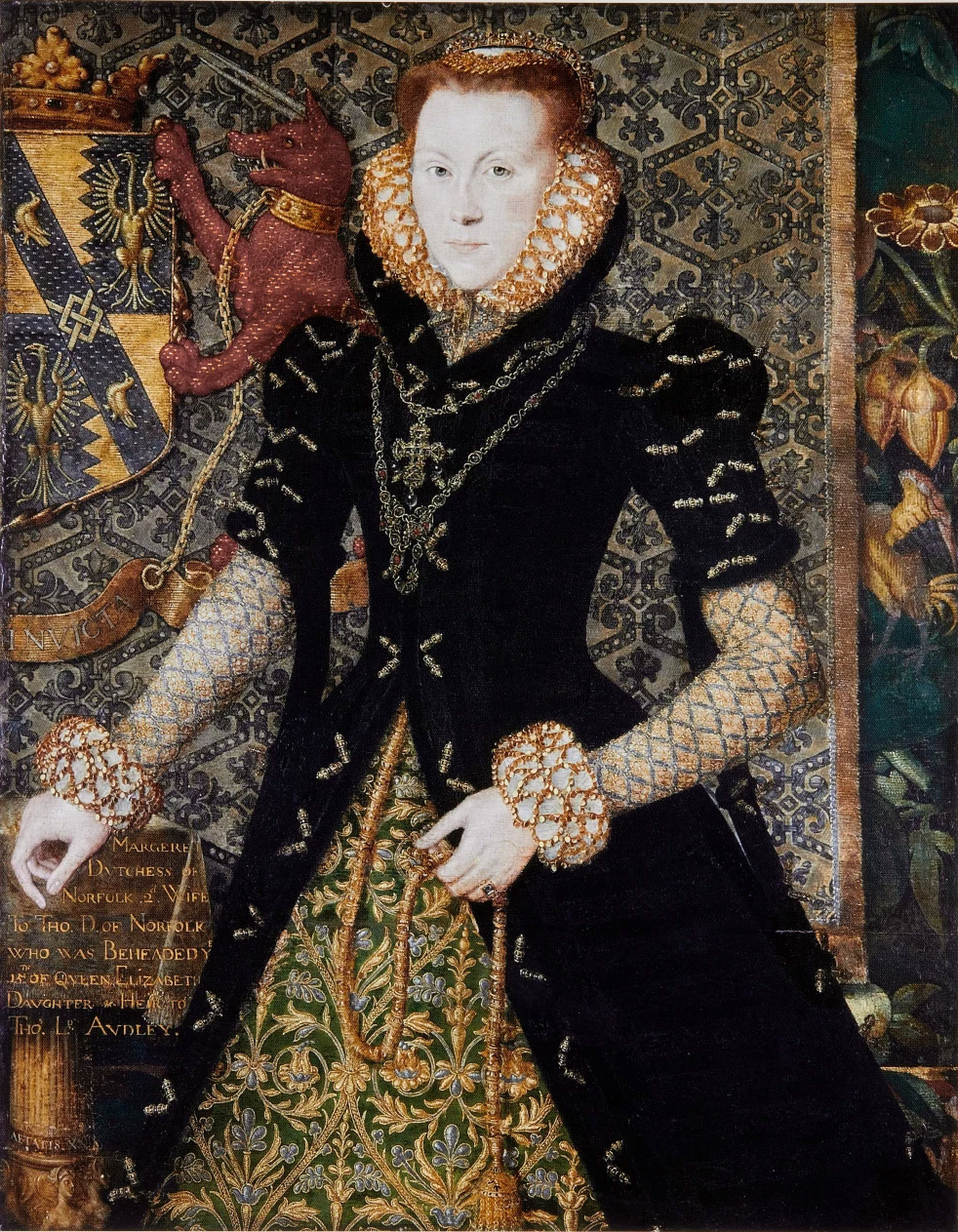
- Margaret Howard, Duchess of Norfolk by Hans Eworth, 1562
- Born: 1540
- Died: 9 January 1564 (aged 23–24)
- Buried: first at St. John the Baptist's Church, Norwich and then at Church of St Michael the Archangel, Framlingham
- Spouses: Lord Henry Dudley; Thomas Howard, 4th Duke of Norfolk
- Issue: Lady Elizabeth Howard; Thomas Howard, 1st Earl of Suffolk; Lord William Howard; Lady Margaret Sackville
- Father: Thomas Audley, 1st Baron Audley of Walden
- Mother: Lady Elizabeth Grey

Coat of arms of the Audley family

Margaret Howard, Duchess of Norfolk (née Audley) (1540 – 9 January 1564) was a 16th-century English noble. She was the sole surviving child of Thomas Audley, 1st Baron Audley of Walden, and Lady Elizabeth Grey, herself the daughter of Thomas Grey, 2nd Marquess of Dorset, and his wife Margaret Wotton, therefore Margaret was a niece of Henry Grey, Duke of Suffolk and first cousin of Lady Jane Grey.

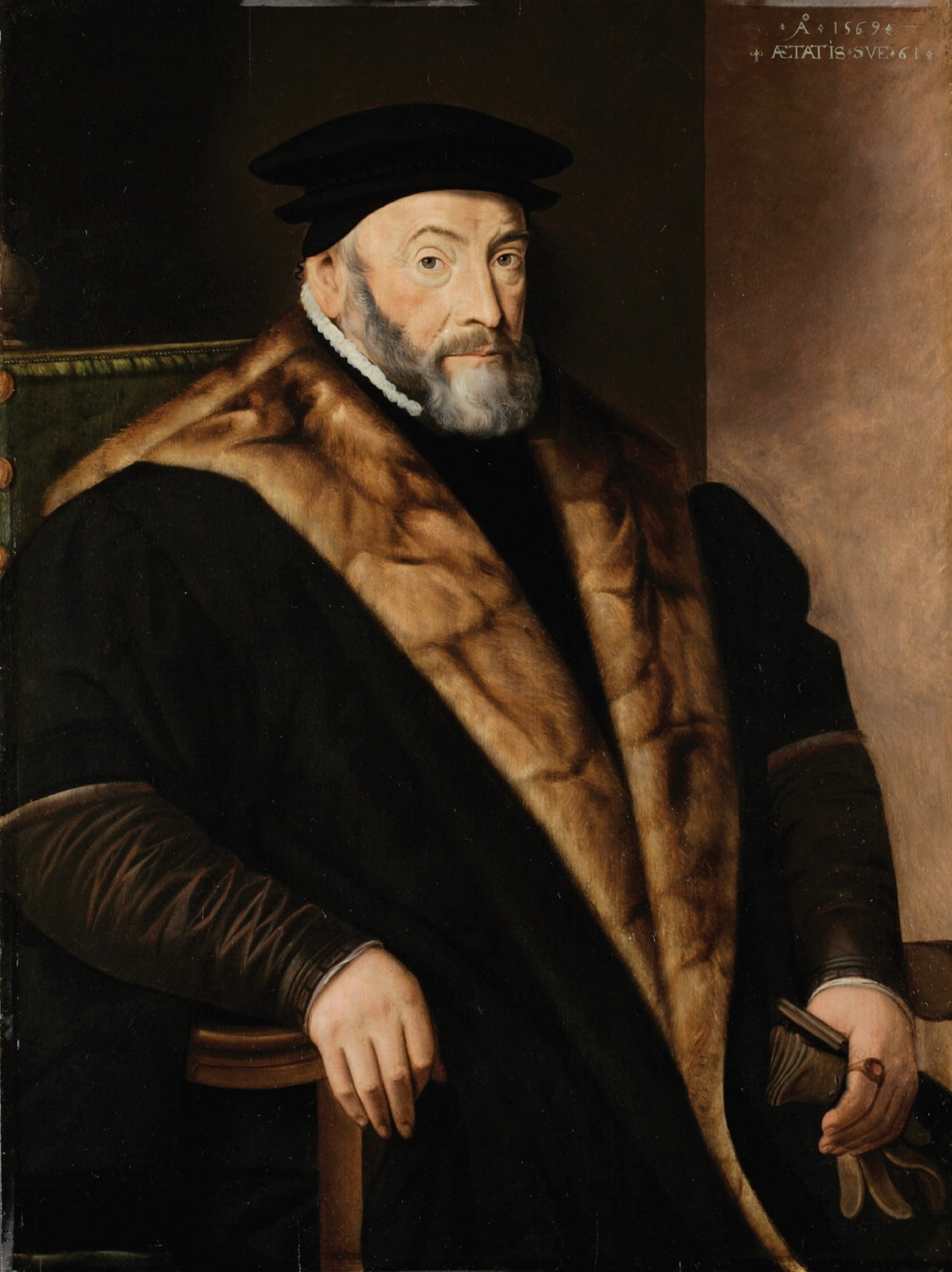
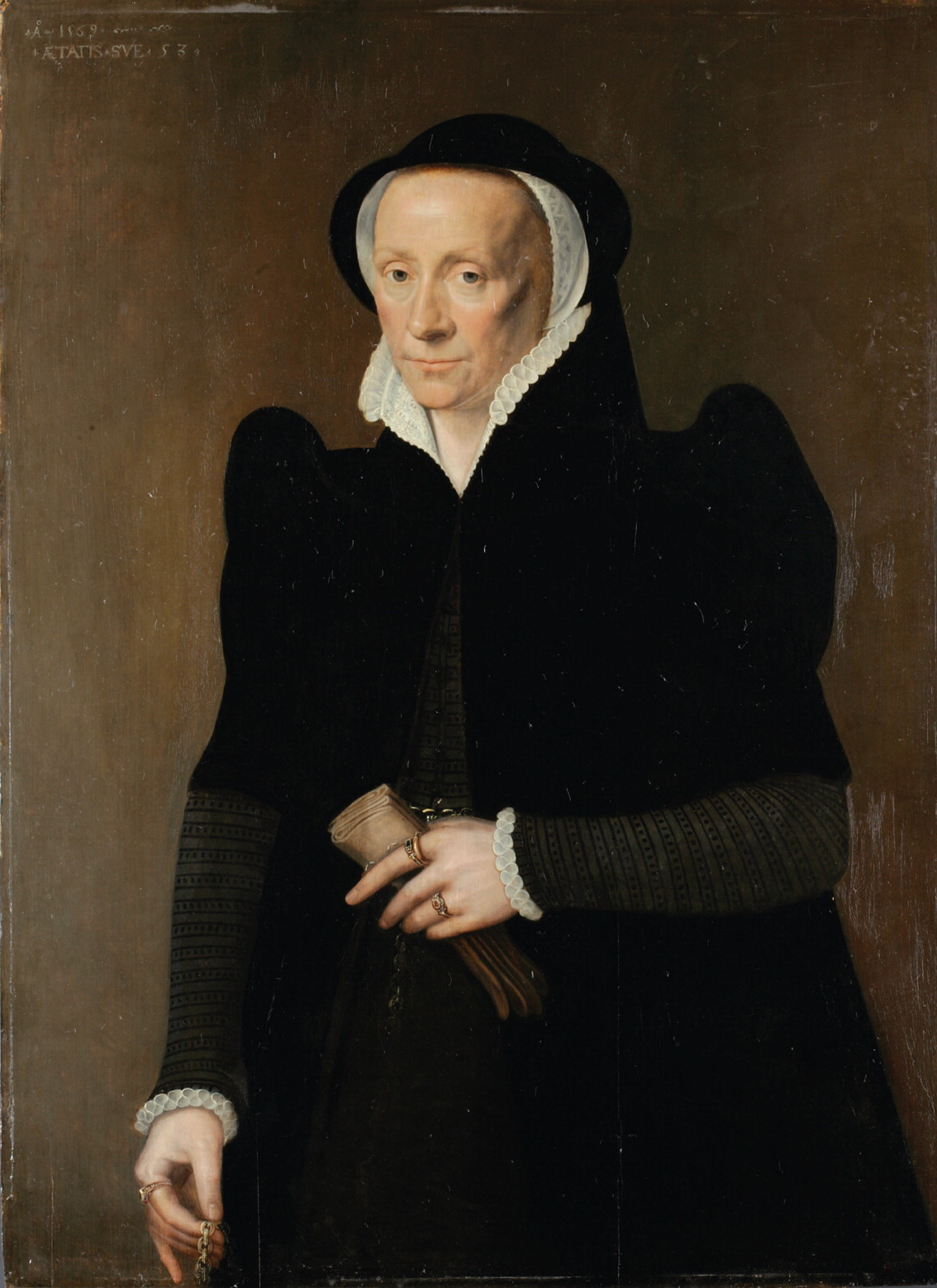
Thomas Audley, 1st Baron Audley of Walden and Lady Elizabeth Grey, Margaret parents

== Marriages ==
Margaret was a wealthy heiress and married first, without issue, Lord Henry Dudley, the youngest son of John Dudley, 1st Duke of Northumberland. Henry was the brother-in-law of Lady Jane Grey, Margaret's first cousin. Margaret's lands were forfeited when her husband was attainted in the wake of his father's failed attempt to usurp the throne in favour of Jane Grey. In 1556, after her husband had been pardoned, they sued in chancery court to gain back her territory in Hertfordshire, which had been claimed by Thomas Castell. Henry Dudley was killed at the storming of St. Quentin on 27 August 1557.

In early 1558, Margaret became betrothed to Thomas Howard, 4th Duke of Norfolk, who had recently been widowed following the death of his first wife, Lady Mary FitzAlan. Mary was a first cousin of Audley, and for the marriage to be valid under Roman Catholic canon law, a dispensation was requested from the Holy See. Her future husband sent lawyers to Rome to negotiate the granting of this dispensation; however, the Papacy was notorious for its delays and high costs in such matters. These delays, added to the fact that in November of the same year, Catholic Queen Mary I died and was succeeded by Elizabeth I who began to restore Protestantism, led to the marriage being celebrated without the dispensation. It was ratified by Parliament in March 1559.

In January 1559, the new Duchess of Norfolk participated in the coronation of Elizabeth I. Lady Margaret Douglas, the queen's cousin, and the Duchess were the two principal ladies of honour who rode behind the queen in her procession from the Tower of Westminster. The following day, she accompanied her husband who carried St Edward's Crown to Westminster Abbey, while she bore the train of the new queen. After the coronation, the Norfolks retired to Kenninghall and did not return to London until the following autumn.

The Duke and Duchess had four children:

- Lady Elizabeth Howard (1560-?), who died in early childhood. She was buried in St Michael the Archangel's Church, Framlingham.
- Thomas Howard, 1st Earl of Suffolk (1561-1626), who firstly married his step-sister, Mary Dacre, no issue. He married secondly to Katherine Knyvet c. 1583 and had issue.
- Lady Margaret Howard (1562-1591), who married Robert Sackville, 2nd Earl of Dorset and had issue.
- Lord William Howard of Naworth Castle and Henderskelfe Castle (now the site of Castle Howard) (1563-1640), who married Elizabeth Dacre, daughter of Thomas Dacre, 4th Baron Dacre and Elizabeth Leyburne, who coincidentally became Duchess of Norfolk in 1567 as the third wife of the 4th Duke of Norfolk. Had issue.

== Death ==
At Christmas 1563, Margaret, anxious to be reunited with her husband, left Audley End, despite being still weak from the birth of her fourth child a few days before. During the journey she fell ill with a respiratory condition that worsened as the days passed, and she died in Norwich on 9 January, 1564. Her mother-in-law, Lady Frances de Vere widowed Countess of Surrey was the chief mourner at the Duchess's funeral. She was buried in the first instance St. John the Baptist's church in Norwich, although shortly afterwards her remains were moved to the Church of St Michael the Archangel in Framlingham, Suffolk. A large tomb carrying heraldic quarterings together with the effigies of Margaret and Norfolk's first wife Mary FitzAlan, shown in their peerage robes, was erected in Framlingham in their honour although Mary FitzAlan was never buried there. After Margaret's death, her mother Lady Elizabeth Grey watched over her grandchildren until the duke married Elizabeth Leyburne in 1567.

In 1842 the tomb was opened and found to be nearly empty, with the exception of a skull and a few ashes. A possibility is that at some point, Audley's remains were moved to Fitzalan Chapel in Arundel, where also repose the remains of her cousin Mary, her uncle Henry FitzAlan, 12th Earl of Arundel and Katherine Grey.

In the Church of St. John the Baptist in Norwich, where the Duchess was first buried, there is a monument erected to her memory. There is also the coat of arms of the Audley family, quartered with the coat of arms of the Howards and the motto Sola Virtus Invicta (only virtue is invincible).

== Ancestry ==
Ancestors of Margaret Audley, Duchess of Norfolk

8. Ralph Audley
4. Geoffrey Audley of Earls Colne
2. Thomas Audley, 1st Baron Audley of Walden
1. Margaret Audley
24. Sir John Grey
12. Thomas Grey, 1st Marquess of Dorset
25. Elizabeth Woodville, Queen of England
6. Thomas Grey, 2nd Marquess of Dorset
26. William Bonville, 6th Baron Harington
13. Cecily Bonville, Baroness Harington and Bonville
27. Lady Katherine Neville
3. Lady Elizabeth Grey
28. Nicholas Wotton
14. Sir Robert Wotton
29. Elizabeth Bamburgh
7. Margaret Wotton, Marchioness of Dorset
30. Henry Belknap
15. Anne Belknap
31. Margaret Knollys
