= Caroline Pryer =

Current Lord Lieutenant of Northumberland

Lord Lieutenant of Northumberland
- Incumbent
- Assumed office 1 May 2024
- Monarch: Charles III
- Preceded by: The Duchess of Northumberland

Deputy Lord Lieutenant of Northumberland
- In office 2021–2024

Deputy Lieutenant of Northumberland
- In office 2010–2021

Caroline Anne Pryer is the current Lord Lieutenant of Northumberland and the county's Custos Rotulorum, succeeding Jane Percy, Duchess of Northumberland. She lives in Northumberland, with her husband, David. She has two adult sons.

The Lord Lieutenant of Northumberland engages in many charity activities such as memorial services; they are the crown's representative in the county.

She served as Vice Lord Lieutenant between 2021 and 2024, and Deputy Lieutenant from 2010 to 2021.
