= Henry Clifford, 5th Earl of Cumberland =

English noble

The Right Honourable Henry Clifford
- The Earl of Cumberland
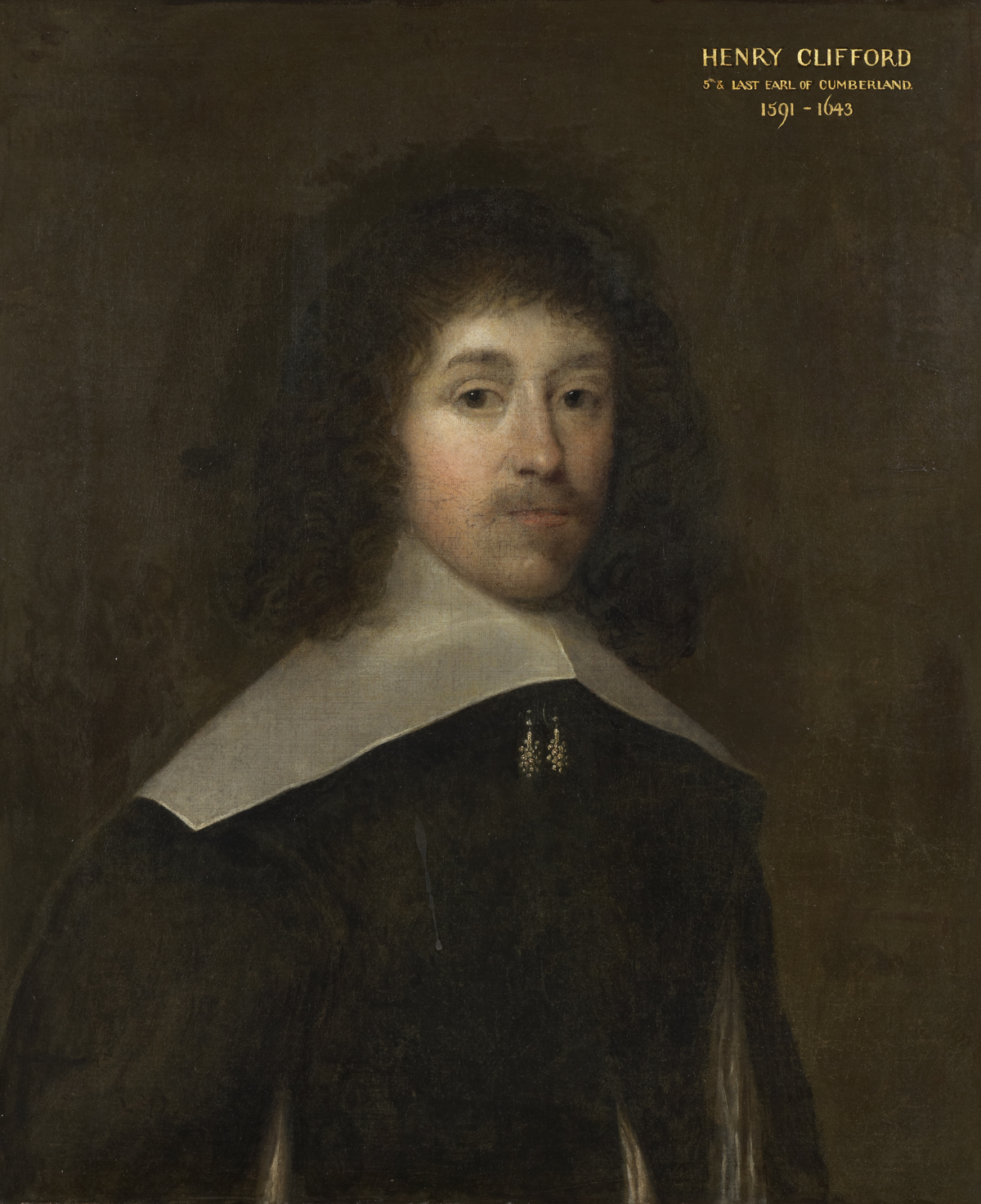
- A painting of Henry Clifford by Cornelis Janssens van Ceulen
- Tenure: 1641–1643 (Earl of Cumberland); 1628–1643 (Baron Clifford)
- Predecessor: Francis Clifford, 4th Earl of Cumberland; New creation (Baron Clifford)
- Successor: Title extinct (Earl of Cumberland); Lady Elizabeth Clifford (Baroness Clifford)
- Other titles: Baron Clifford
- Born: 28 February 1591
- Died: 11 December 1643 (aged 52)
- Spouse: Lady Frances Cecil (m. 1610)
- Issue: Lady Elizabeth Clifford, Baroness Clifford
- Father: Francis Clifford, 4th Earl of Cumberland
- Mother: Grisold Hughes

Henry Clifford, 5th Earl of Cumberland (28 February 1591 – 11 December 1643) was an English landowner and politician who sat in the House of Commons between 1614 and 1622. He was created a baron in 1628 and succeeded to the title Earl of Cumberland in 1641.

Clifford was the son of Francis Clifford, 4th Earl of Cumberland, and Grisold Hughes and a member of the Clifford family which held the seat of Skipton from 1310 to 1676. He was educated at Christ Church, Oxford. In 1607, he became joint Lord Lieutenant of Cumberland, Northumberland and Westmorland. He was elected Member of Parliament for Westmorland in 1614, and was returned in 1621. In 1621, he became Custos Rotulorum of Westmorland. He was created Baron Clifford in 1628.

Clifford was a supporter of Charles I during the so-called Bishops' Wars in Scotland, and also during the Civil War until his death. He succeeded to the title of Earl of Cumberland in 1641 and died two years later in 1643 at the age of 52; as he left no sons the earldom became extinct.

Clifford married Lady Frances Cecil (1593 – 14 February 1644), daughter of Robert Cecil, 1st Earl of Salisbury and Elizabeth Brooke on 25 July, 1610, at St Mary Abbots Church, Kensington. They had one child: Lady Elizabeth Clifford who married Richard Boyle, 1st Earl of Burlington.

Political offices
Vacant Title last held by The 3rd Earl of Cumberland	Lord Lieutenant of Cumberland; 1607–1639; With: The 4th Earl of Cumberland 1607–1639; The Earl of Suffolk 1607–1639; The Earl of Dunbar 1607–1611; The Earl of Northumberland 1626–1639; The Earl of Arundel 1632–1639; Lord Maltravers 1632–1639	Succeeded by The Earl of Arundel; Lord Maltravers
Vacant Title last held by The 3rd Earl of Cumberland	Lord Lieutenant of Northumberland; 1607–1639; With: The 4th Earl of Cumberland 1607–1639; The Earl of Suffolk 1607–1639; The Earl of Dunbar 1607–1611; The Earl of Northumberland 1626–1639; The Earl of Arundel 1632–1639; Lord Maltravers 1632–1639	Succeeded by The Earl of Northumberland
Vacant Title last held by The 3rd Earl of Cumberland	Lord Lieutenant of Westmorland; 1607–1642; With: The 4th Earl of Cumberland 1607–1641; The Earl of Suffolk 1607–1639; The Earl of Dunbar 1607–1611; The Earl of Northumberland 1626–1639; The Earl of Arundel 1632–1639; Lord Maltravers 1632–1639	English Interregnum
Vacant Title last held by Sir Thomas Strickland	Custos Rotulorum of Westmorland; 1621–1641	Succeeded by Sir Philip Musgrave, Bt
Parliament of England
Preceded by Sir Richard Musgrave; Sir Thomas Strickland	Member of Parliament for Westmorland; 1614–1622; With: Sir Thomas Wharton	Succeeded by Sir John Lowther; Robert Strickland
Peerage of England
Preceded by Francis Clifford	Earl of Cumberland; 1641–1643	Extinct
New title	Baron Clifford; 1628–1643	Succeeded by Elizabeth Clifford
