= Theophilus Howard, 2nd Earl of Suffolk =

English nobleman and politician (1584–1640)

The Right Honourable The Earl of Suffolk KG
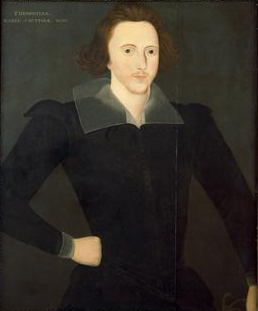
- The Earl of Suffolk
- Born: 13 August 1584; Saffron Waldon, Essex, England
- Died: 3 June 1640 (aged 55); Charing Cross, London, England
- Burial place: St Mary the Virgin, Saffron Walden, Essex, England
- Occupation: English Earl
- Spouse: Elizabeth Home (m. 1612; died 1633)
- Children: James Howard, 3rd Earl of Suffolk; Thomas Howard; Katherine Stuart, Viscountess of Newburgh; Elizabeth Percy, Countess of Northumberland; Margaret Boyle, Countess of Orrery; George Howard, 4th Earl of Suffolk; Henry Howard, 5th Earl of Suffolk; Anne Walsingham; Frances Villiers
- Parents: Thomas Howard, 1st Earl of Suffolk (father); Catherine Knyvet (mother)

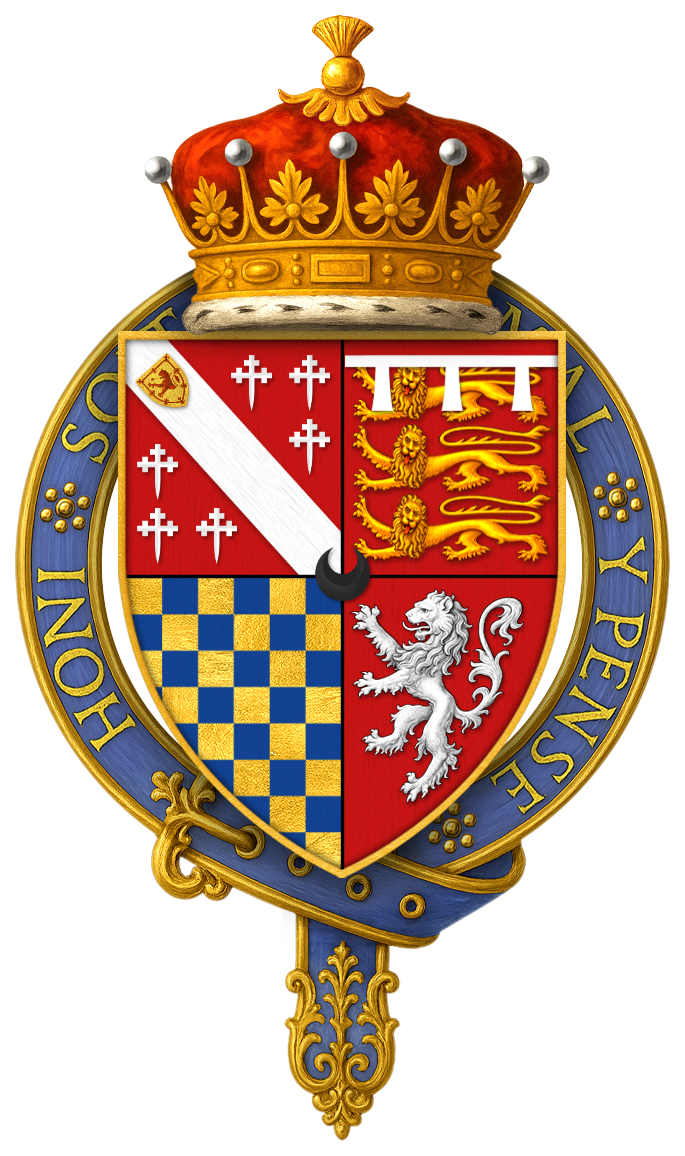
Arms of Sir Theophilus Howard, 2nd Earl of Suffolk, KG

Theophilus Howard, 2nd Earl of Suffolk, KG (13 August 1584 – 3 June 1640) was an English nobleman and politician.

== Career ==
Born at the family estate of Saffron Walden, he was the son of Thomas Howard, 1st Earl of Suffolk, by his second wife, Catherine Knyvet of Charlton, and succeeded his father as 2nd Earl of Suffolk and 2nd Baron Howard de Walden in 1626, along with some other of his father's offices, including the lord-lieutenancy of the counties of Suffolk, Cambridge and Dorset.

Howard performed in the masque Hymenaei at the marriage of the Earl of Essex and Frances Howard in January 1606. He danced in Lord Hay's Masque to celebrate the marriage of James Hay and Honora Denny on 6 January 1607. On 9 February 1608 he performed in the masque The Hue and Cry After Cupid at Whitehall Palace as a sign of the zodiac, to celebrate the wedding of John Ramsay, Viscount Haddington to Elizabeth Radclyffe. During the progress of Anne of Denmark in April 1613, he danced in the masque at Caversham Park. Howard and his "three brethren" danced in The Somerset Masque at Whitehall Palace on 26 December 1613.

Sir Theophilus Howard was named in the Second Charter of Virginia made by King James I on 23 May 1609. The members of this extensive list were "incorporated by the name of The Tresorer and Companie of Adventurers and Planters of the Citty of London for the Firste Collonie in Virginia".

He was elected MP for Maldon in a by-election in 1605 caused by the death of Sir Edward Lewknor and sat until he was ennobled in 1610 as Baron Howard de Walden by a Writ of Acceleration.

He was the dedicatee of Shelton's translation of Don Quixote, the first translation of the work in any language. The translation of the first part of Don Quixote was published in London in 1612, while Cervantes was still alive. It is not known why Shelton chose Howard as a dedicatee, although he was possibly a distant relative. He was also the dedicatee of John Dowland's last book of songs "A Pilgrimes Solace", also published in 1612.

Howard visited Scotland in 1613. He dined with his brother-in-law James Home of Cowdenknowes at Broxmouth House, and then stayed in John Killoch's house in Edinburgh's Canongate, where the Duke of Lennox had stayed in 1608. He visited Dunfermline Palace and saw the coal works of George Bruce at Culross. After a visit to Stirling Castle, he stayed a night at the Nether Palace or Castlestead of Falkland with Lord Scone, and returned by boat to Leith and the King's Wark, the home of Bernard Lindsay. He went to Seton Palace to see Anna Hay, Countess of Winton, and then returned to England.

Howard's parents received a pension from Spanish diplomats. In 1617, they were offered a Dutch pension. Howard discussed the deal with the Spanish ambassador Diego Sarmiento de Acuña, Count of Gondomar. He persuaded his parents not to take the Dutch offer, and Gondomar gave him a valuable diamond jewel.

Howard was engaged in a legal dispute with his former sister-in-law Mary Fitz.

Howard owned Framlingham Castle in Suffolk which he sold to Sir Robert Hitcham in 1635 for the sum of £14,000. He owned Audley End House in Essex as well, built by his father Thomas Howard, 1st Earl of Suffolk

He died in 1640 at Suffolk House, Charing Cross, London, and was buried on 10 June that year in Saffron Walden.

== Marriage and children ==
In March 1612, he married Elizabeth Home (died 19 August 1633), daughter of George Home, 1st Earl of Dunbar. According to a memoir of the early life of Princess Elizabeth, the daughter of King James and Anne of Denmark, she had been one of the Princess's companions at Coombe Abbey from 1604. They had nine children:

- James Howard, 3rd Earl of Suffolk (c. 1620 – 1689)
- Thomas Howard (1621–81), married to Walburga or Werburge van der Kerchove
- Katherine Howard (died 1650), married first George Stewart, 9th Seigneur d'Aubigny (died 1642), second James Livingston, 1st Earl of Newburgh
- Elizabeth Howard (died 11 March 1705), married on 1 October 1642 Algernon Percy, 10th Earl of Northumberland
- Margaret Howard, married Roger Boyle, 1st Earl of Orrery (1621–1679)
- George Howard, 4th Earl of Suffolk (1625–1691)
- Henry Howard, 5th Earl of Suffolk (1627–1709)
- Anne Howard, married Thomas Walsingham
- Frances Howard (c.1633–1677), who married Sir Edward Villiers (died 1689)

Political offices
| Preceded by The Viscount Howard of Bindon | Vice-Admiral of Dorset; 1603–1611 | Succeeded by The Lord Cottington |
| Vacant Title last held by The Earl of Cumberland | Lord Lieutenant of Cumberland; 1607–1639; With: The Earl of Cumberland 1607–1639; The Lord Clifford 1607–1639; The Earl of Dunbar 1607–1611; The Earl of Northumberland 1626–1639; The Earl of Arundel 1632–1639; Lord Maltravers 1632–1639 | Succeeded by The Earl of Arundel; Lord Maltravers |
| Vacant Title last held by The Earl of Cumberland | Lord Lieutenant of Westmorland; 1607–1639; With: The Earl of Cumberland 1607–1639; The Lord Clifford 1607–1639; The Earl of Dunbar 1607–1611; The Earl of Northumberland 1626–1639; The Earl of Arundel 1632–1639; Lord Maltravers 1632–1639 | Succeeded by The Earl of Cumberland; The Lord Clifford |
| Vacant Title last held by The Earl of Cumberland | Lord Lieutenant of Northumberland; 1607–1639; With: The Earl of Cumberland 1607–1639; The Lord Clifford 1607–1639; The Earl of Dunbar 1607–1611; The Earl of Northumberland 1626–1639; The Earl of Arundel 1632–1639; Lord Maltravers 1632–1639 | Succeeded by The Earl of Northumberland |
| Preceded by The Earl of Suffolk | Captain of the Gentlemen Pensioners; 1616–1635 | Succeeded by The Earl of Salisbury |
| Preceded by The Earl of Suffolk | Custos Rotulorum of Suffolk; 1624–1640 | Succeeded by The Earl of Suffolk |
| Preceded by The Earl of Suffolk | Lord Lieutenant of Suffolk; 1626–1640 | Succeeded by The Earl of Suffolk; Sir Thomas Jermyn |
| Preceded by The Earl of Suffolk | Custos Rotulorum of Essex; 1624–1640 | Succeeded by The Lord Maynard |
| Preceded by The Earl of Suffolk | Lord Lieutenant of Cambridgeshire; 1626–1640 | Succeeded by The Lord Maynard |
| Preceded by The Earl of Suffolk | Lord Lieutenant of Dorset; 1626–1640; With: The Earl of Suffolk 1626–1628 | Succeeded by The Lord Cottington |
| Preceded by The Viscount Howard of Bindon | Custos Rotulorum of Dorset bef. 1621–1640 | Succeeded by The Lord Cottington |
Honorary titles
| Preceded by The Duke of Buckingham | Lord Warden of the Cinque Ports; 1628–1640 | Succeeded by The Duke of Lennox |
Peerage of England
| Preceded by Thomas Howard | Earl of Suffolk; 1626–1640 | Succeeded by James Howard |
| Preceded by Thomas Howard | Baron Howard de Walden (writ of acceleration); 1610–1640 | Succeeded by James Howard |
