= Custos Rotulorum of Surrey =

This is a list of people who have served as Custos Rotulorum of Surrey.

- Sir Thomas Pope bef. 1544–1559
- William Howard, 1st Baron Howard of Effingham bef. 1562–1573
- Edward Clinton, 1st Earl of Lincoln 1573–1585
- Charles Howard, 1st Earl of Nottingham 1585–1618
- Sir Edward Howard 1618–1620
- Sir Francis Howard 1620 – aft. 1621
- Thomas Howard, 21st Earl of Arundel 1624–1636
- Henry Howard, Baron Maltravers 1636–1646
- Interregnum
- John Mordaunt, 1st Viscount Mordaunt 1660–1675
- George Berkeley, 1st Earl of Berkeley 1675–1689
- Henry Howard, 7th Duke of Norfolk 1689
- George Berkeley, 1st Earl of Berkeley 1689–1698
- Charles Berkeley, 2nd Earl of Berkeley 1699–1710
- James Berkeley, 3rd Earl of Berkeley 1710–1736
- Thomas Onslow, 2nd Baron Onslow 1737–1740

For later custodes rotulorum, see Lord Lieutenant of Surrey.
