= Henry Howard, 15th Earl of Arundel =

English nobleman

The Right Honorable The Earl of Arundel PC(Ire)
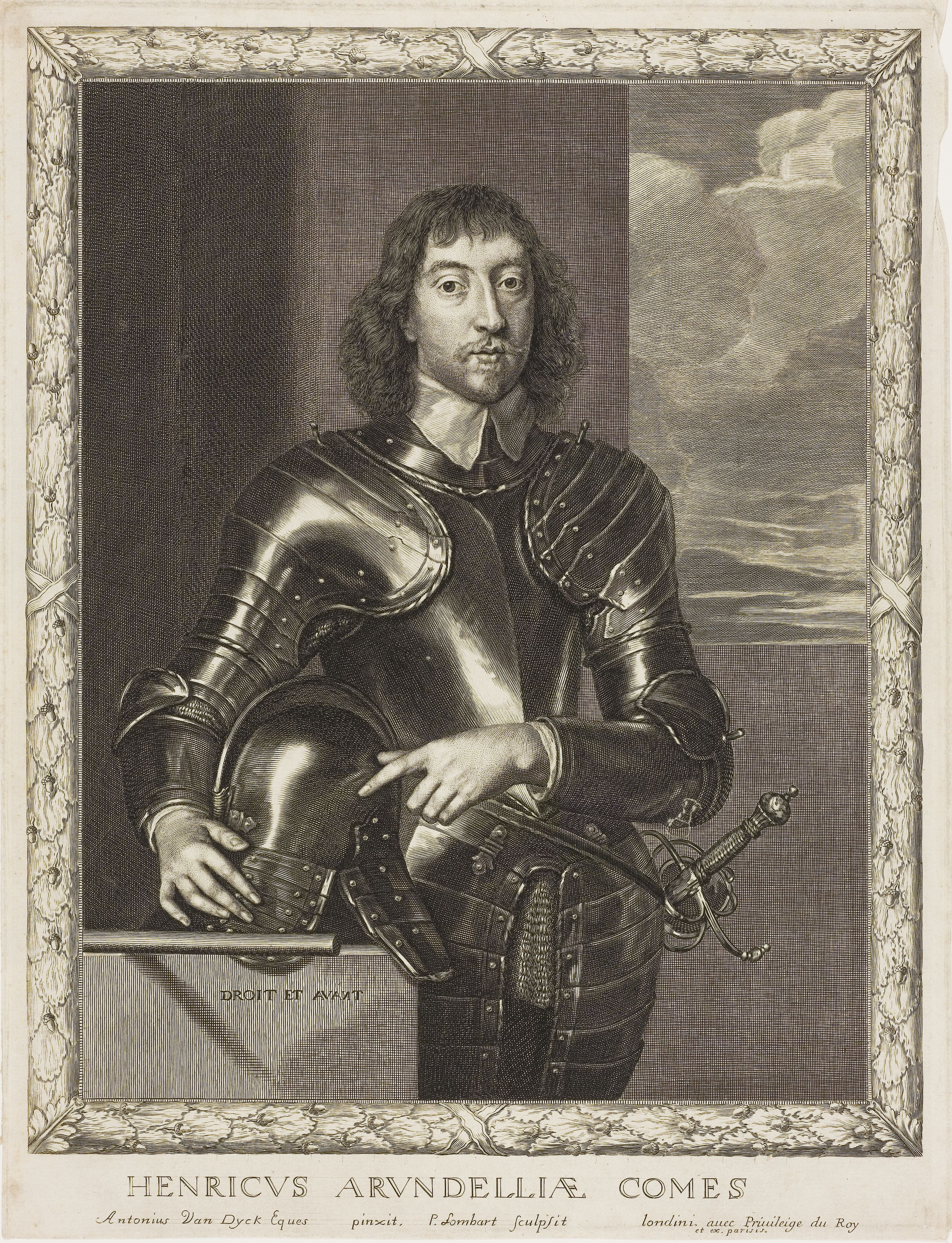
- Born: 15 August 1608
- Died: 17 April 1652 (aged 43)
- Buried: Arundel Castle, Arundel, West Sussex, England
- Noble family: Howard
- Spouse: Lady Elizabeth Stuart
- Issue: 12, including: Thomas Howard, 5th Duke of Norfolk; Henry Howard, 6th Duke of Norfolk; Lord Philip Howard; Lord Charles Howard; Lord Bernard Howard
- Father: Thomas Howard, 14th Earl of Arundel
- Mother: Alethea Talbot

Henry Frederick Howard, 15th Earl of Arundel PC(Ire) (15 August 1608 – 17 April 1652), styled Lord Maltravers until 1640, and Baron Mowbray from 1640 until 1652, was an English nobleman, chiefly remembered for his role in the development of the rule against perpetuities.

== Early life ==
Arundel was the second son of Thomas Howard, 14th Earl of Arundel, and Lady Alethea Talbot, later 13th Baroness Furnivall. His grandmother Anne, the dowager Countess of Arundel, arranged for Henry to be baptised and christened as "Frederick Henry" at Woodstock Palace in October 1608 with Anne of Denmark as godmother. The Queen's children Henry and Elizabeth were also present.

He studied at St John's College, Cambridge, matriculating in 1624.

== Public life ==
Before ascending to the peerage, Lord Arundel had served as Member of Parliament for Arundel in the Parliament of England from 1628 until 1629. He was again elected to represent Arundel in March 1640, but was called to the House of Lords by writ of acceleration as Baron Mowbray, one of his father's subsidiary titles, before he could take his seat. He also represented Callan in the Parliament of Ireland in 1634.

After his father's death in 1646, he became Earl of Arundel and the titular head of the Howard family. He had been due to inherit his mother's peerage (Baron Furnivall), but he pre-deceased her and upon her death in 1654 it was inherited by his eldest son Thomas.

== The entailment ==
Henry sought to control the succession to his property after his death. Toward that end, he placed in his will a shifting executory limitation so that title to some property would pass to his eldest son (who was mentally deficient) and then to his second son, and title to other property would pass to his second son, and then to his fourth son. The estate plan also included provisions for shifting the titles many generations later if certain conditions should occur.

When his second son, Henry, succeeded to the elder brother's property, he did not want to pass the other property to his younger brother, Charles. Charles sued to enforce his interest, and the court (in this instance, the House of Lords) held that such a shifting condition could not exist indefinitely. The judges believed that tying up property too long beyond the lives of people living at the time was wrong, although the exact period was not determined for another 150 years.

== Family ==
Lord Arundel married Lady Elizabeth Stuart, daughter of Esme Stuart, 3rd Duke of Lennox, on 7 March 1626. They had nine sons (10 on list below?) and three daughters:

- Thomas Howard, 5th Duke of Norfolk (1626/27–1677), died without issue
- Henry Howard, 6th Duke of Norfolk (1628–1683/84), had issue; (ancestor of 7th through 9th Dukes of Norfolk)
- Philip Howard (1629–1694), Catholic Cardinal
- Charles Howard (1630–1713), married Mary Tattershall (d. 1695), had issue; they were the grandparents of Charles Howard, 10th Duke of Norfolk;
- Lady Anne Howard (born 1632)
- Lady Catherine Howard (1634–1655)
- Talbot Howard (born 1636)
- Edward Howard (1637–1691), married Anne Wilbraham, had issue.
- Francis Howard (1640–1683), died in Geele, Belgium as stated in his brother Cardinal Philip Howard's Biography.
- Bernard Howard of Glossop (1641–1717), married Catherine Tattershall (died 1727, sister of his brother Charles's wife Mary) and had issue, including Bernard Howard II of Glossop, who married Anne Roper (died 1744), had issue, including Henry Howard of Glossop and Sheffield, who married Juliana Molyneux, had issue, including Bernard Howard, 12th Duke of Norfolk (from who all subsequent Dukes of Norfolk descend) and Lord Henry Howard-Molyneux-Howard;
- Esme Howard (1645–1728), had one daughter, who died unmarried
- Lady Elizabeth Howard (1651–1705)
- John Howard (1652–1711)

== Ancestry ==
Ancestors of Henry Howard, 15th Earl of Arundel

16. Henry Howard, Earl of Surrey
8. Thomas Howard, 4th Duke of Norfolk
4. Philip Howard, 13th Earl of Arundel
9. Lady Mary FitzAlan
2. Thomas Howard, 14th Earl of Arundel
10. Thomas Dacre, 4th Baron Dacre
5. Anne Dacre
11. Elizabeth Leyburne
1. Henry Howard, 15th Earl of Arundel
12. George Talbot, 6th Earl of Shrewsbury
6. Gilbert Talbot, 7th Earl of Shrewsbury
13. Lady Gertrude Manners
3. Lady Alethea Tabot
14. Sir William Cavendish
7. Mary Cavendish
15. Elizabeth Hardwick

Parliament of England
Preceded by William Mill; Nicholas Jordain	Member of Parliament for Arundel; 1628–1629; With: John Alford	Parliament suspended until 1640
Parliament of Ireland
Preceded by	Member of Parliament for Callan; 1634–1635	Succeeded by
Political offices
Preceded by The Earl of Cumberland; The Lord Clifford; The Earl of Suffolk	Lord Lieutenant of Northumberland jointly with The Earl of Arundel; The Earl of Cumberland; The Lord Clifford; The Earl of Suffolk; 1632–1639	Succeeded by The Earl of Northumberland
Preceded by The Earl of Cumberland; The Lord Clifford; The Earl of Suffolk	Lord Lieutenant of Westmorland jointly with The Earl of Arundel; The Earl of Cumberland; The Lord Clifford; The Earl of Suffolk; 1632–1639	Succeeded by The Earl of Cumberland; The Lord Clifford
Preceded by The Earl of Cumberland; The Lord Clifford; The Earl of Suffolk	Lord Lieutenant of Cumberland jointly with The Earl of Arundel 1632–1642; The Earl of Cumberland 1632–1639; The Lord Clifford 1632–1639; The Earl of Suffolk 1632–1639; 1632–1642	Vacant English Interregnum
Preceded by The Earl of Arundel	Lord Lieutenant of Norfolk jointly with The Earl of Arundel 1633–1642; 1633–1642	Vacant English Interregnum
Preceded by The Earl of Nottingham; The Viscount Wimbledon; The Earl of Arundel	Lord Lieutenant of Surrey jointly with The Earl of Nottingham 1636–1642; The Viscount Wimbledon 1636–1638; The Earl of Arundel 1636–1642; 1636–1642	Vacant English Interregnum
Preceded by The Earl of Dorset; The Earl of Northumberland	Lord Lieutenant of Sussex jointly with The Earl of Dorset; The Earl of Northumberland; 1636–1642	Vacant English Interregnum
Preceded by The Earl of Arundel	Custos Rotulorum of Norfolk, Sussex and Surrey; 1636–1642	Vacant English Interregnum
Peerage of England
Preceded by Thomas Howard	Earl of Arundel; 1646–1652	Succeeded by Thomas Howard
Preceded by Thomas Howard	Baron Mowbray (writ in acceleration); 1640–1652	Succeeded by Thomas Howard
