= Earl of Cumberland =

Title created in Peerage of England in 1525

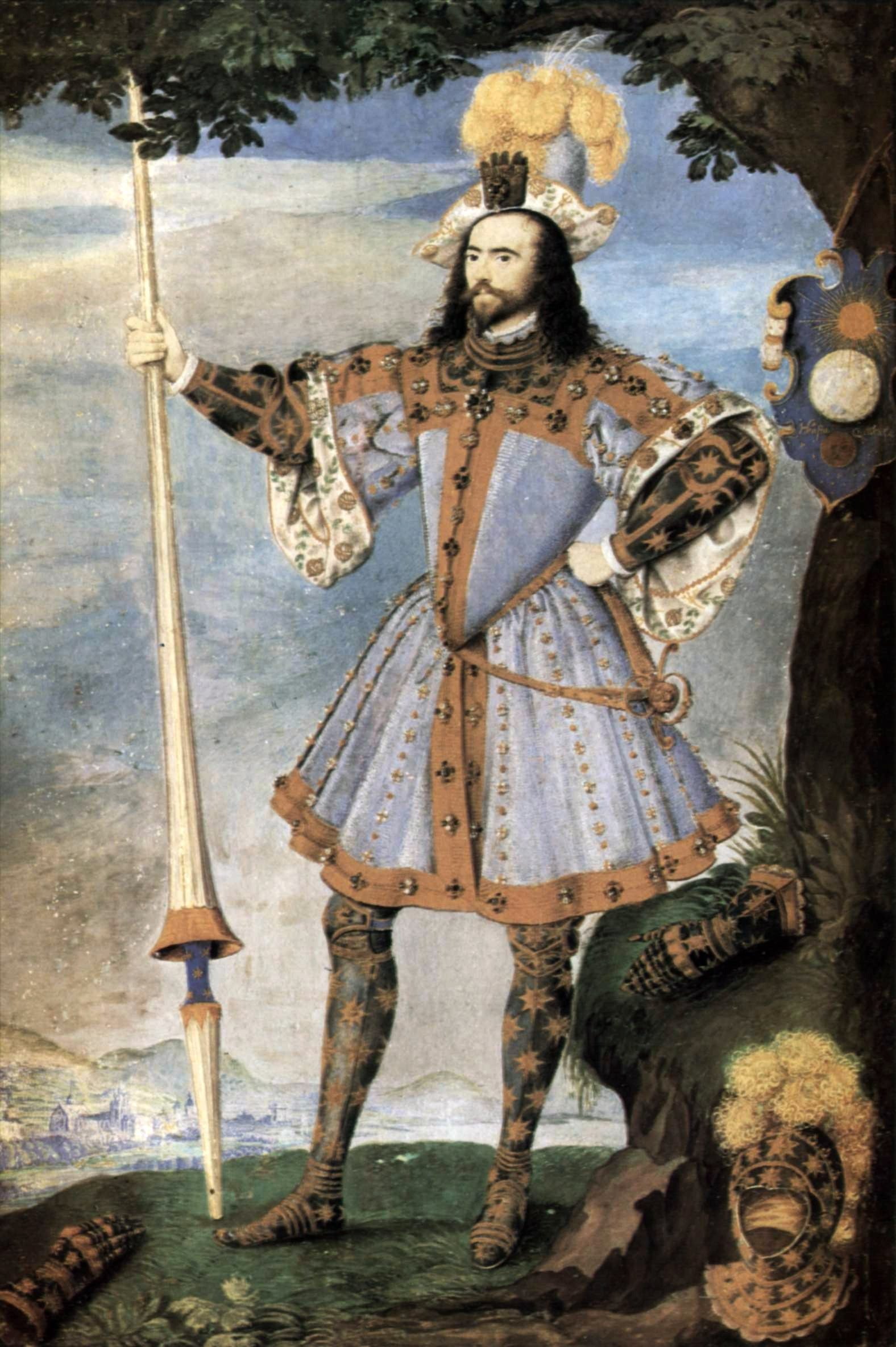
George Clifford, 3rd Earl of Cumberland, portrait by Nicholas Hilliard, c. 1590.

The title of Earl of Cumberland was created in the Peerage of England in 1525 for the 11th Baron de Clifford. It became extinct in 1643. The Dukedom of Cumberland was created the following year for Prince Rupert of the Rhine, maternal nephew of Charles I.

The subsidiary title of the first three earls was Baron de Clifford. The last earl was created Baron Clifford before he became earl, in 1628.

== Earls of Cumberland (1525) ==
- Henry Clifford, 1st Earl of Cumberland (1493–1542)
- Henry Clifford, 2nd Earl of Cumberland (1517–1570)
- George Clifford, 3rd Earl of Cumberland (1558–1605)
- Francis Clifford, 4th Earl of Cumberland (1559–1641)
- Henry Clifford, 5th Earl of Cumberland (1591–1643)
