= Lord Lieutenant of Northumberland =

Lord Lieutenant of Northumberland Dr Caroline Pryer
- Incumbent
- Assumed office 1 May 2024
- Monarch: Charles III
- Custos Rotulorum of Northumberland
- Preceded by: Jane Percy, Duchess of Northumberland

This is a list of people who have served as Lord-Lieutenant of Northumberland. Since 1802, all Lords Lieutenant have also been Custos Rotulorum of Northumberland.

Lord-lieutenants are the Crowns representative in every County.

Dr Caroline Pryer is the Incumbent, since the 1 May 2024.

- Henry Percy, 3rd Earl of Northumberland
- Henry Percy, 4th Earl of Northumberland ?–1489
- Henry Algernon Percy, 5th Earl of Northumberland 28 April 1489 – 19 May 1527
- Henry Hastings, 3rd Earl of Huntingdon 20 August 1586 – 14 December 1595
- vacant
- George Clifford, 3rd Earl of Cumberland 1603–1605
- vacant
- Francis Clifford, 4th Earl of Cumberland 27 October 1607 – 31 August 1639 jointly with
- George Home, 1st Earl of Dunbar 27 October 1607 – 20 January 1611 and
- Theophilus Howard, 2nd Earl of Suffolk 27 October 1607 – 31 August 1639 and
- Henry Clifford, 1st Baron Clifford 27 October 1607 – 31 August 1639 and
- Thomas Howard, 21st Earl of Arundel 23 July 1632 – 31 August 1639 and
- Henry Howard, Lord Maltravers 23 July 1632 – 31 August 1639
- Algernon Percy, 10th Earl of Northumberland 13 November 1626 – 1642
- Interregnum
- Algernon Percy, 10th Earl of Northumberland 12 September 1660 – 13 October 1668 jointly with
- Joceline Percy, 11th Earl of Northumberland 12 September 1660 – 31 May 1670
- William Cavendish, 1st Duke of Newcastle-upon-Tyne 13 July 1670 – 25 December 1676 jointly with
- Henry Cavendish, 2nd Duke of Newcastle-upon-Tyne 13 July 1670 – 20 April 1689
- Richard Lumley, 1st Earl of Scarbrough 20 April 1689 – 17 December 1721
- Richard Lumley, 2nd Earl of Scarbrough 24 January 1722 – 29 January 1740
- Charles Bennet, 2nd Earl of Tankerville 6 March 1740 – 14 March 1753
- Hugh Percy, 1st Duke of Northumberland 23 March 1753 – 6 June 1786
- Hugh Percy, 2nd Duke of Northumberland 16 September 1786 – 1798
- In commission
- Hugh Percy, 2nd Duke of Northumberland 4 June 1802 – 10 July 1817
- Hugh Percy, 3rd Duke of Northumberland 18 August 1817 – 11 February 1847
- Henry Grey, 3rd Earl Grey 13 March 1847 – 1 January 1877
- Algernon Percy, 6th Duke of Northumberland 1 January 1877 – 2 January 1899
- Albert Grey, 4th Earl Grey 1 March 1899 – 13 December 1904
- Henry Percy, 7th Duke of Northumberland 13 December 1904 – 14 May 1918
- Alan Percy, 8th Duke of Northumberland 19 July 1918 – 23 August 1930
- Sir Charles Trevelyan, 3rd Baronet 7 November 1930 – 28 April 1949
- Wentworth Beaumont, 2nd Viscount Allendale 28 April 1949 – 16 December 1956
- Hugh Percy, 10th Duke of Northumberland 16 May 1956 – 3 January 1984
- Matthew White Ridley, 4th Viscount Ridley 3 January 1984 – 25 August 2000
- Sir John Riddell, 13th Baronet 25 August 2000 – 11 May 2009
- Jane Percy, Duchess of Northumberland 12 May 2009 – 1 May 2024
- Caroline Pryer 1 May 2024 – present

== Deputy Lieutenants ==
Deputy Lieutenants traditionally supported the Lord-Lieutenant. There could be many deputy lieutenants at any time, depending on the population of the county. Their appointment did not terminate with the changing of the Lord-Lieutenant, but they often retired at age 75.

- Edward Grey, 1st Viscount Grey of Fallodon 11 April 1901
- Sir Benjamin Chapman Browne 11 April 1901
- Sir William Haswell Stephenson 11 April 1901
- William Watson-Armstrong, 1st Baron Armstrong 11 April 1901
- Shallross Fitzherbert Widdrington 11 April 1901
- Henry de La Poer Beresford, 6th Marquess of Waterford 21 May 1901
- George Bennet, 7th Earl of Tankerville 21 May 1901
- Sir Hubert Jerningham 21 May 1901
- Matthew White Ridley, 2nd Viscount Ridley 21 May 1901
- Lawrence William Adamson, 21 May 1901
- Stephen Sanderson, 21 May 1901
- John Coppin Straker, 21 May 1901
- Hugh Andrews,21 May 1901
- Addington Francis Baker Cresswell, 21 May 1901
- Pierre Gabriel Theodore, 1st Count de Loriol Chandieu
