= Custos Rotulorum of Sussex =

This is a list of people who have served as Custos Rotulorum of Sussex.

- Sir William Shelley bef. 1544–1549
- Sir Richard Sackville 1549–1566
- Thomas Sackville, 1st Earl of Dorset bef. 1573–1608
- Thomas Howard, 21st Earl of Arundel 1608–1636
- Henry Howard, Baron Maltravers 1636–1646
- Interregnum
- Algernon Percy, 10th Earl of Northumberland 1660–1668
- Joceline Percy, 11th Earl of Northumberland 1668–1670
- Richard Sackville, 5th Earl of Dorset 1670–1677
- Charles Sackville, 6th Earl of Dorset 1677–1706

For later custodes rotulorum, see Lord Lieutenant of Sussex.
