= Lord Lieutenant of Sussex =

Civil post in Sussex, England

This is a list of people who served as Lord Lieutenant of Sussex. From 1677 until 1974, all Lord Lieutenants were also Custos Rotulorum of Sussex.

== Lord Lieutenants of Sussex to 1974 ==
- Henry FitzAlan, 19th Earl of Arundel 1551–? jointly with
- Thomas West, 9th Baron De La Warr 1551–?
- Henry FitzAlan, 19th Earl of Arundel 1559–1561
- John Lumley, 1st Baron Lumley 1561–1569
- Anthony Browne, 1st Viscount Montagu 1570–1585 jointly with
- William West, 1st Baron De La Warr 1570 – 1585 and
- Thomas Sackville, 1st Baron Buckhurst 1570 – 1585
- Charles Howard, 1st Earl of Nottingham 3 July 1585 – 26 August 1608 jointly with
- Thomas Sackville, 1st Earl of Dorset 1586 – 19 April 1608 and
- Henry Percy, 3rd Earl of Northumberland 1586 – 26 August 1608
- Robert Sackville, 2nd Earl of Dorset 26 August 1608 – 27 February 1609
- vacant
- Richard Sackville, 3rd Earl of Dorset 10 December 1612 – 28 March 1624
- Edward Sackville, 4th Earl of Dorset 13 July 1624 – 1642 jointly with
- Algernon Percy, 10th Earl of Northumberland 16 September 1635 – 1642 and
- Henry Howard, Baron Maltravers 2 June 1636 – 1642
- English Interregnum
- Algernon Percy, 10th Earl of Northumberland 11 August 1660 – 13 October 1668
- Joceline Percy, 11th Earl of Northumberland 9 November 1668 – 31 May 1670
- Richard Sackville, 5th Earl of Dorset 15 July 1670 – 27 August 1677 jointly with
- Charles Sackville, 6th Earl of Dorset 15 July 1670 – 28 February 1688
- Francis Browne, 4th Viscount Montagu 28 February 1688 – 17 April 1689
- Charles Sackville, 6th Earl of Dorset 17 April 1689 – 29 January 1706
- Algernon Seymour, 7th Duke of Somerset 22 April 1706 – 7 February 1750
- vacant
- John Ashburnham, 2nd Earl of Ashburnham 18 March 1754 – 20 September 1757
- George Nevill, 1st Earl of Abergavenny 20 September 1757 – 4 July 1761
- Thomas Pelham-Holles, 1st Duke of Newcastle-upon-Tyne 4 July 1761 – 15 January 1763
- Charles Wyndham, 2nd Earl of Egremont 15 January 1763 – 21 August 1763
- Charles Lennox, 3rd Duke of Richmond 23 November 1763 – 29 December 1806
- Charles Howard, 11th Duke of Norfolk 19 January 1807 – 16 December 1815
- Charles Lennox, 4th Duke of Richmond 11 March 1816 – 28 August 1819
- George Wyndham, 3rd Earl of Egremont 18 November 1819 – 19 June 1835
- Charles Gordon-Lennox, 5th Duke of Richmond 19 June 1835 – 21 October 1860
- Henry Pelham, 3rd Earl of Chichester 21 November 1860 – 16 March 1886
- Henry Brand, 1st Viscount Hampden 6 April 1886 – 14 March 1892
- William Nevill, 1st Marquess of Abergavenny 12 April 1892 – 19 December 1905
- Henry Fitzalan-Howard, 15th Duke of Norfolk 19 December 1905 – 11 February 1917
- Charles Wyndham, 3rd Baron Leconfield 26 March 1917 – 25 January 1949
- Bernard Fitzalan-Howard, 16th Duke of Norfolk 25 January 1949 – 31 March 1974

At this point the Lieutenancy was split into two, per the Local Government Act 1972, and replaced by the Lord Lieutenant of East Sussex and the Lord Lieutenant of West Sussex.
