= Custos Rotulorum of Norfolk =

This is a list of people who have served as Custos Rotulorum of Norfolk.

- Sir Richard Southwell bef. 1544 – aft. 1547
- Sir James Boleyn bef. 1558 – 1561
- Sir William Woodhouse bef. 1562 – 1564
- Sir Christopher Heydon bef. 1573 – 1579
- Sir Drue Drury bef. 1584 – 1617
- Sir Philip Wodehouse, 1st Baronet 1617
- Thomas Howard, 21st Earl of Arundel 1617–1636
- Henry Howard, Lord Maltravers 1636–1646
- Interregnum
- Sir Philip Wodehouse, 3rd Baronet 1660–1681
- Henry Richardson, 3rd Lord Cramond 1681–1689
- Henry Howard, 7th Duke of Norfolk 1689–1701

For later custodes rotulorum, see Lord Lieutenant of Norfolk.
