= Algernon Percy, 10th Earl of Northumberland =

English nobleman (1602–1668)

The Right Honourable The Earl of Northumberland KG JP
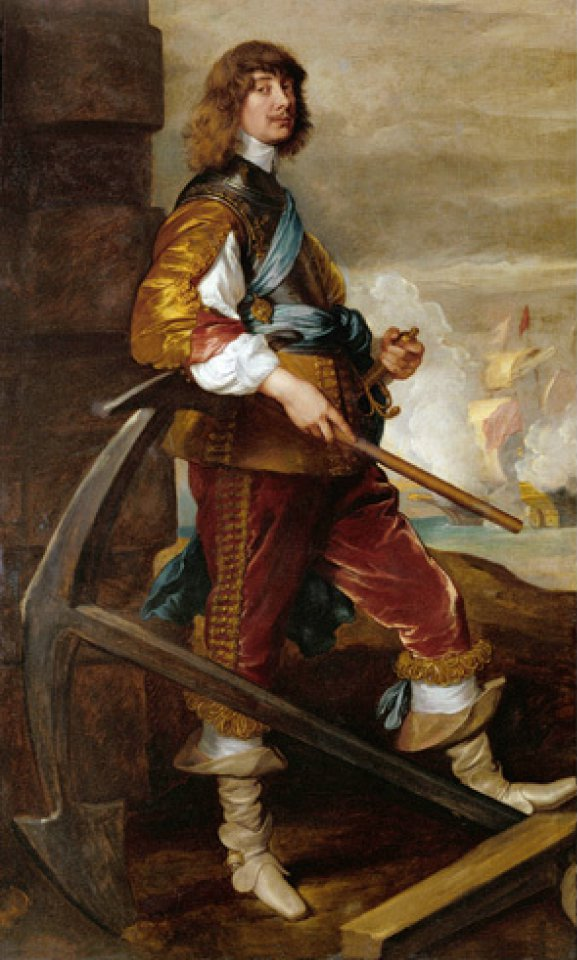
- Portrait by Anthony van Dyck

Lord Lieutenant of Sussex Lord Lieutenant of Northumberland
- In office 1661–1668

Lord High Admiral
- In office 1638–1642

Lord Lieutenant of Cumberland Lord Lieutenant of Westmorland
- In office 1626–1639

Member of Parliament for Chichester
- In office 1625–1626

Member of Parliament for Sussex
- In office 1624–1625

Personal details
- Born: 29 September 1602 Essex House, London, England
- Died: 13 October 1668 (aged 66) Petworth House, West Sussex, England
- Resting place: Westminster Chapel
- Spouse(s): Lady Anne Cecil (? – 1637); Lady Elizabeth Howard
- Children: Lady Anne Percy; Elizabeth Capell, Countess of Essex; Josceline Percy, 11th Earl of Northumberland
- Parents: Henry Percy, Earl of Northumberland (father); Lady Dorothy Devereux (mother)
- Education: St John's College, Cambridge
- Occupation: Aristocrat; politician

Algernon Percy, 10th Earl of Northumberland, 4th Baron Percy, KG, JP (29 September 1602 – 13 October 1668), was an English aristocrat, and supporter of the Parliamentary cause in the First English Civil War.

The Percys had been the leading family in Northern England for centuries, and one of the richest, a combination that made them both essential to a stable regime, and dangerous. His ancestors included Henry "Hotspur", who led two rebellions, and died at Shrewsbury in 1405; his great-uncle was executed for treason in 1537, as was his uncle, the 2nd Earl of Essex, in 1601. His grandfather died in the Tower of London, where his father Henry Percy was held from 1605 to 1621. From 1569 to 1630, the Percys were barred from visiting their estates in the North.

This made his support, and that of his cousin, the 3rd Earl of Essex, an important asset for Parliament when the civil war began in 1642. His position as Lord High Admiral also helped secure the Royal Navy, a decisive factor in winning the war.

While contemporaries acknowledged this was driven by a genuine belief in constitutional monarchy, his innate caution meant he could appear unreliable. He supported peace moves in 1643, then the war party headed by Oliver Cromwell, followed by a number of changes in allegiance. The breaking point was his refusal to support the execution of Charles I in 1649. During the 1649 to 1660 Commonwealth of England, he lived on his estates.

Attempts to re-enter politics after the 1660 Restoration failed, although he held several minor positions under Charles II. He died at Petworth House in October 1668.

== Biographical details ==
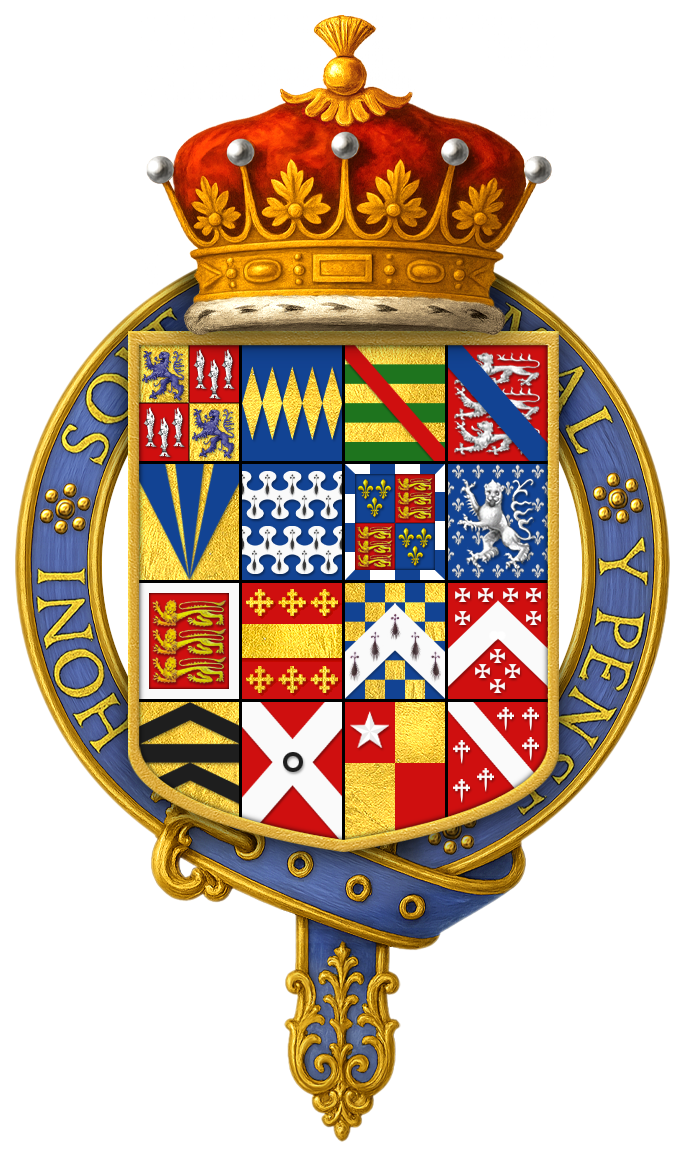
Quartered arms of Sir Algernon Percy, 10 Earl of Northumberland, KG

Algernon Percy was the third, but eldest surviving, son of Henry Percy, 9th Earl of Northumberland, the so-called 'Wizard Earl.' His mother Dorothy was sister of Robert Devereux, 2nd Earl of Essex, executed for treason in 1601. The marriage was not a success; Henry claimed the terms of the marriage contract had not been fulfilled, and considered his wife a bad influence on his sons. In 1605, he was accused of complicity in the Gunpowder Plot, and imprisoned in the Tower of London, where he remained until 1621.

His sister, Lucy Hay née Percy, dowager countess of Carlisle, and his younger brother, Henry Percy, were members of the household of Charles I's queen, Henrietta Maria. Another sister, Dorothy, was married to Robert Sidney, 2nd Earl of Leicester.

In 1629, Algernon married Lady Anne Cecil, daughter of William Cecil, 2nd Earl of Salisbury; his father considered it a bad match, allegedly because he blamed Anne's grandfather for his imprisonment. Before her death in 1637, they had five daughters, two of whom lived to adulthood; Anne (died 1654), and Elizabeth (1636–1718), who married Arthur Capell, 1st Earl of Essex. His second marriage to Lady Elizabeth Howard (died 1705) produced his son and heir Josceline (1644–1670).

== Career; 1615–1642 ==
Despite his imprisonment, Percy spent long periods with his father, who attempted to supervise and control his education, which followed the normal path for nobility of the period. from 1615 to 1618, he attended St John's College, Cambridge, then studied law at the Middle Temple in London. In 1618, he and his tutor, Edward Dowse, began a six-year tour of Europe, including visits to the Dutch Republic, Italy, and France.

After returning to England in 1624, he was elected MP for Sussex, then Chichester. In March 1626, he moved to the House of Lords, becoming known as "Baron Percy." When his father died in 1632, he succeeded to his title.

In November 1626, he was appointed joint Lord Lieutenant of Cumberland, Westmorland, and Northumberland. Percy became a leader in the House of Lords of the faction opposed to Charles I's favourite, George Villiers, 1st Duke of Buckingham.

=== Naval career ===
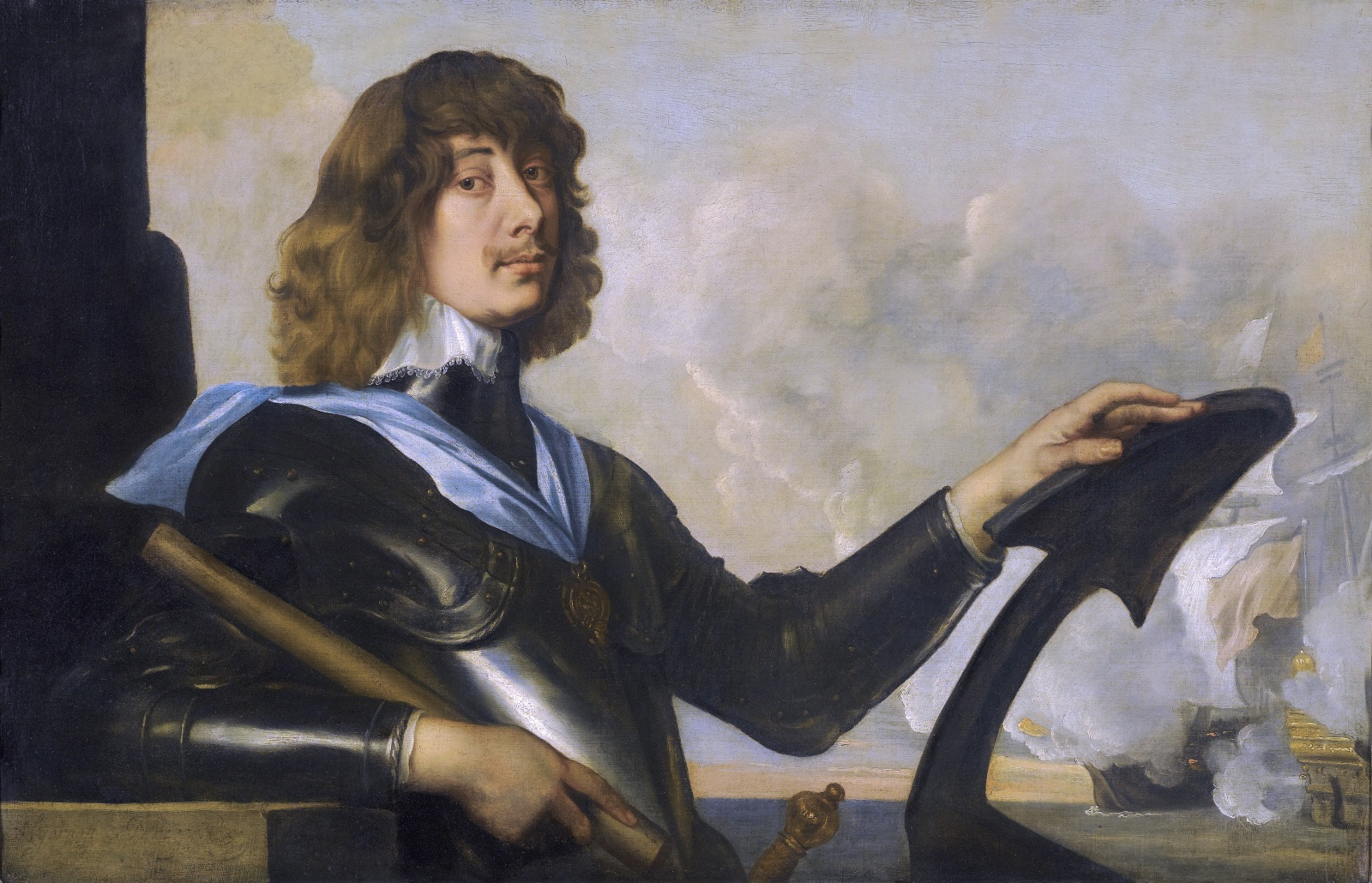
Algernon Percy

Throughout the early 1630s, the 10th Earl attempted to ingratiate himself with Charles I's court, initially unsuccessfully, although his family connections in the Queen's household did manage to get him admitted to the Order of the Garter in 1635. By 1636–1637, he was in good enough standing at court to be appointed admiral of the ship money fleet. Northumberland attempted to initiate naval reforms, often bypassing the lords of the admiralty and submitting his proposals directly to Charles I and the Privy Council. Although most historians would not consider Northumberland a Puritan, he did enforce the Oath of Supremacy on his fleet and removed three Catholic officers who refused to take the oath.

Northumberland's first expedition as admiral in 1636 was to force Dutch ships fishing in waters claimed by England to purchase English fishing licences, in exchange for which the English fleet would offer protection from the Dunkirkers. If Dutch sea captains refused to purchase the licences, their nets were cut.

Northumberland was less enthusiastic about his second expedition as admiral, which was to transport Spanish money to the Spanish Netherlands in 1637. His political faction was strongly pro-French and anti-Spanish, so he rankled at the thought of aiding the Spaniards.

==== Lord High Admiral ====
In 1638, two of Northumberland's prominent supporters at court — Thomas Wentworth and Archbishop of Canterbury William Laud — used their influence at court to have him made Lord High Admiral of England, a position which had been vacant since the assassination of the 1st Duke of Buckingham in 1628. At the time he was appointed, it was understood that Charles I's son James would become Lord High Admiral upon attaining his majority, although the Civil Wars occurred before this could happen and Charles removed Northumberland from the post in 1642.

=== Events leading to the Civil Wars ===
In response to the rise of the Scottish Covenanters, who opposed the attempt to introduce the Book of Common Prayer in Scotland in 1637, Charles I appointed an eight-man subcommittee of the Privy Council to deal with the issue. Northumberland's patron, Thomas Wentworth, favoured war with Scotland, while Northumberland did not want to go to war, and feared that his estates in northern England would be occupied during the hostilities. As such, when Wentworth had Northumberland appointed general of the English forces during the second of the Bishops' Wars in January 1640, Northumberland was happy to let illness prevent him from joining the army in the field, and Northumberland was entirely defeatist about the prospect of beating the Covenanters militarily. In May 1640, Northumberland was one of only two members of a subcommittee of the Privy Council who opposed the dissolution of the Short Parliament, a move that confirmed his break with Wentworth (whom Charles had recently named Earl of Strafford) and earned him the displeasure of the King.

When the Long Parliament met, Northumberland became one of the leading critics of royal policy. During Strafford's trial for high treason and the subsequent bill of attainder against him, Northumberland gave evidence at his trial which, though favourable on the important point of bringing the Irish army to England, was on the whole damaging.

Northumberland's brother Henry was involved in the First Army Plot of 1641, an attempt to rescue Strafford from the Tower of London and to forcibly dissolve the Long Parliament. Northumberland encouraged his brother to write a letter exposing the royalist plot to rescue Strafford, and then, at John Pym's urging, agreed to allow Denzil Holles and John Hampden to publish this letter.

== The English Civil War, 1642–1649 ==
=== Northumberland's role in the First English Civil War, 1642–1646 ===
==== Break with the king ====
With the coming of the English Civil War, Northumberland became the highest-ranking member of Charles I's government to side with the Parliamentarians.

His first action in open defiance of royal authority came in November 1641, when he obeyed Parliament's instruction to prepare four ships to take men and arms under parliamentary control to Ireland to suppress the rebellion there. He did not, however, support the Grand Remonstrance. However, when James Stewart, 1st Duke of Richmond suggested in January 1642 that the parliament adjourn for six months, Northumberland led a protest which favoured sanctioning Richmond for breach of privilege. In February, Parliament named Northumberland Lord Lieutenant of Sussex, Pembrokeshire, and Anglesey. Northumberland subsequently voted in favour of the Militia Ordinance. During the subsequent fighting between royalist and parliamentary forces, Northumberland's control of the navy was a crucial factor in securing parliamentary victory. As a result, Charles I removed Northumberland from the post of Lord High Admiral in late June 1642 and Northumberland relinquished the position. In July, he accepted a position on the parliamentary committee of public safety.

Northumberland's support for the war wavered shortly thereafter, however, in the wake of setbacks faced by parliamentary forces in 1642–1643; he was also disappointed that Parliament chose Robert Rich, 2nd Earl of Warwick rather than himself as the new Lord High Admiral. He was apparently appalled by the violence of the Battle of Edgehill and the Battle of Turnham Green, and became the leader of a party favouring peace by early-to-mid-1643.

==== Second marriage ====
Northumberland's first wife died of smallpox in 1637. In October 1642, he remarried, to Lady Elizabeth, daughter of Theophilus Howard, 2nd Earl of Suffolk and thus his first wife's cousin.

==== Conversion to the peace faction ====
In April 1643, Northumberland headed the parliamentary delegation to negotiate with Charles I at Oxford, but Charles was willing to grant little. Returning to London, Northumberland's peace party was increasingly attacked by the party favouring continued war: for example, in June, he was accused of complicity in Waller's Plot, though he was never prosecuted. In August, a leading hawk, Isaac Penington, the Lord Mayor of London instigated a plot whereby a number of lords were physically threatened, in the hopes that he would be able to have Northumberland arrested. After Northumberland was unable to convince his cousin, Robert Devereux, 3rd Earl of Essex to support further peace negotiations with the royalists, he retired to his estates at Petworth—unlike other "peace lords", who joined the King at Oxford at this time.

==== Conversion to the war party ====
Northumberland did not remain at Petworth for long, though. Although he had opposed an alliance between parliament and Scotland against the King, following the passage of the Solemn League and Covenant in September 1643, Northumberland returned to the capital and took the Covenant. He was soon appointed to the newly created Committee of Both Kingdoms, serving as its first chairman. Northumberland would gain a reputation as a supporter of the Scots on the committee – many speculated that this was because Scottish forces were occupying his lands in the north. Thus, although he continued to favour negotiations with Charles I, he was quickly coming around to the war party's position. Northumberland was one of only four lords to vote in favour of the Self-denying Ordinance. Soon, he would prove to be one of the greatest supporters of the New Model Army, with his servant Robert Scawen chairing parliament's army committee.

In March 1645, Parliament made Northumberland guardian of Charles' two young children, Princess Elizabeth and the Duke of Gloucester (and also the Duke of York in July 1646), and there was talk that Northumberland might be made king if negotiations with Charles failed. Following the failure of the negotiations at Uxbridge, Northumberland was thoroughly behind the war party, now known as the Independents. In spite of Northumberland's political conversion, he did not vote in favour of the bill of attainder against his old patron, Archbishop Laud.

=== 1647: Between the First and Second English Civil War ===
In early 1647, Northumberland sided with Edward Montagu, 2nd Earl of Manchester and the Presbyterian party against the Independents as they attempted to draw up terms acceptable to the King.

In the emerging dispute between parliament and the army, Northumberland sided with the army, and in July 1647, he was one of nine peers who left Parliament for the army following riots around Westminster. Meetings were subsequently held between Northumberland and the army at his property, Syon House.

Northumberland led a final attempt to negotiate with Charles I in December 1647, but this failed.

=== Role in the Regicide ===
Northumberland opposed the Vote of No Addresses in January 1648 and backed the continuation of attempts to agree terms with Charles I, along with former members of the Peace Party in the House of Commons, such as Denzil Holles. Attitudes on both sides hardened following Royalist defeat in the February to August 1648 Second English Civil War and a significant section of Parliament and senior officers of the New Model Army, including Oliver Cromwell, concluded further negotiation with Charles I was pointless. In December 1648, Pride's Purge excluded those MPs who wanted to continue talks, creating the so-called Rump Parliament which voted to put the king on trial. Northumberland led the Lords in opposing the Execution of Charles I on 30 January 1649.

== Life during the English Interregnum, 1649–1660 ==
Northumberland withdrew from public life following the execution of Charles I. In May 1649, he was relieved of responsibility for the king's children and no longer had any official duties. He was briefly placed under house arrest in 1655 after John Thurloe accused him of encouraging his northern tenants to participate in the Penruddock uprising.

Northumberland refused requests from both Oliver Cromwell and Richard Cromwell to sit in the upper house of their parliaments.

== Life following the Restoration, 1660–1668 ==
With the coming of the Restoration in 1660, Northumberland attempted to re-enter politics by organizing the Suffolk House cabal, which included Edward Montagu, 2nd Earl of Manchester, Denzil Holles, Oliver St John, and William Pierrepont, and which hoped to force on Charles II the terms offered to Charles I at Newport. This cabal collapsed when General Monck chose to support the Convention Parliament in April 1660.

With Charles II's return to England in May 1660, Northumberland rushed to curry favour with the new king. He did however oppose the bill to execute the regicides responsible for Charles I's death.

Charles II appointed Northumberland to his Privy Council in late May 1660, and he was named Lord Lieutenant of Sussex in August and Lord Lieutenant of Northumberland in September. His return to politics was completed with his service as Lord High Constable of England at Charles II's coronation in April 1661. Northumberland gained a reputation as a diligent enforcer of the Clarendon Code and as an efficient organizer of the militias.

During the period of Restoration politics, Northumberland's closest ally at court was Edward Montagu, 2nd Earl of Manchester, while Edward Hyde, 1st Earl of Clarendon remained a constant enemy, a rivalry which climaxed with Northumberland voting in favour of Clarendon's impeachment in 1667.

Northumberland died at Petworth on 13 October 1668 and was buried there shortly afterwards. His son Josceline succeeded him as 11th Earl of Northumberland.

== Notes ==
Political offices
Preceded by The Earl of Cumberland; The Lord Clifford; The Earl of Suffolk	Lord Lieutenant of Cumberland jointly with The Earl of Cumberland 1632–1639; The Lord Clifford 1632–1639; The Earl of Suffolk 1632–1639; The Earl of Arundel 1632–1639; Lord Maltravers 1632–1642; 1626–1639	Succeeded by The Earl of Arundel; Lord Maltravers
Preceded by The Earl of Cumberland; The Lord Clifford; The Earl of Suffolk	Lord Lieutenant of Westmorland jointly with The Earl of Cumberland 1632–1639; The Lord Clifford 1632–1639; The Earl of Suffolk 1632–1639; The Earl of Arundel 1632–1639; Lord Maltravers 1632–1642; 1626–1639	Succeeded by The Earl of Cumberland; The Lord Clifford
Preceded by The Earl of Cumberland; The Lord Clifford; The Earl of Suffolk	Lord Lieutenant of Northumberland jointly with The Earl of Cumberland 1626–1639; The Lord Clifford 1626–1639; The Earl of Suffolk 1626–1639; The Earl of Arundel 1632–1639; Lord Maltravers 1632–1639; 1626–1642	English Interregnum
Preceded by The Earl of Dorset	Lord Lieutenant of Sussex jointly with The Earl of Dorset 1635–1642; Lord Maltravers 1636–1642; 1635–1642	English Interregnum
Preceded by William Juxon	Lord High Admiral; 1638–1643	Succeeded by Francis Cottington
Honorary titles
English Interregnum	Lord Lieutenant of Northumberland jointly with Lord Percy; 1660–1668	Succeeded by The Earl of Northumberland
English Interregnum	Lord Lieutenant and Custos Rotulorum of Sussex; 1660–1668	Succeeded by The Earl of Northumberland
Vacant Title last held by The Duke of Buckingham	Lord High Constable; 1661	Vacant Title next held by The Duke of Grafton
Peerage of England
Preceded by Henry Percy	Earl of Northumberland; 1632–1668	Succeeded by Josceline Percy
Preceded by Henry Percy	Baron Percy (writ in acceleration); 1626–1668	Succeeded by Josceline Percy
