= Francis Clifford, 4th Earl of Cumberland =

English noble

The Right Honourable The Earl of Cumberland
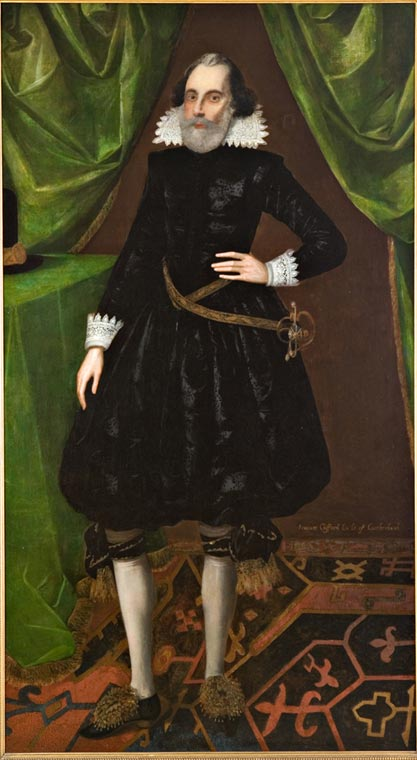

Lord Lieutenant of Westmorland
- In office 1607–1641
- Monarchs: James VI and I Charles I
- Preceded by: The 3rd Earl of Cumberland
- Succeeded by: The 5th Earl of Cumberland

Custos Rotulorum of Cumberland
- In office 1605–1641
- Preceded by: The Lord Scrope of Bolton
- Succeeded by: The 15th Earl of Arundel

Lord Lieutenant of Cumberland Lord Lieutenant of Northumberland
- In office 1607–1639
- Preceded by: The 3rd Earl of Cumberland
- Succeeded by: The 14th Earl of Arundel; The 10th Earl of Northumberland

Member of Parliament for Yorkshire
- In office 1604–1606

High Sheriff of Yorkshire
- In office 1600–1601
- Preceded by: Sir Robert Swift
- Succeeded by: Sir William Wentworth

Member of Parliament for Westmorland
- In office 1584–1588

Personal details
- Born: 1559 Brougham Castle, Westmorland, England
- Died: 4 January 1641 (aged 81) Skipton Castle, Yorkshire, England
- Spouse: Grisold Hughes (m. 1589)
- Children: Lady Frances Clifford; Lady Margaret Clifford; Henry Clifford, 5th Earl of Cumberland
- Parents: Henry Clifford, Earl of Cumberland; Anne Dacre
- Relatives: The Cliffords
- Occupation: Aristocrat; politician

Francis Clifford, 4th Earl of Cumberland (1559 – 4 January 1641) was a member of the Clifford family which held the seat of Skipton from 1310 to 1676.

He was the second son of Henry Clifford, 2nd Earl of Cumberland and Anne Dacre and inherited his title and estates on the death of his brother George, who had willed them to him in place of his daughter Anne. A long lawsuit between them over the possession of the family estates was settled in 1617.

He was elected Member of Parliament for Westmorland in 1584 and 1586 and for Yorkshire in 1604. He was appointed Sheriff of Yorkshire in 1600, constable of Knaresborough castle in 1604 and keeper of Carlisle castle in 1605. He was Custos Rotulorum of Cumberland from 1605 to 1639 and joint Lord Lieutenant of Northumberland (1607–1639), Westmorland (1607–1641) and Newcastle and a member of the Council of the North in 1619.

He married Grisold Hughes, daughter of Thomas Hughes and Elizabeth Dwnn (or Don), daughter of Sir Griffith Dwnn (or Don) and Elizabeth Roche-Eden, circa March 1589.

Children of Francis Clifford, 4th Earl of Cumberland and Grisold Hughes:

- Lady Frances Clifford, married Sir Gervase Clifton, 1st Baronet
- Lady Margaret Clifford (died 1622) married Thomas Wentworth, 1st Earl of Strafford.
- Henry Clifford, 5th Earl of Cumberland b. 28 Feb 1591/92 – d. 11 Dec 1643

He died on 21 January 1640/41.

Political offices
Preceded by The Lord Scrope of Bolton	Custos Rotulorum of Cumberland; 1605?–1641	Vacant Title next held by Lord Maltravers
Vacant Title last held by The Earl of Cumberland	Lord Lieutenant of Cumberland; 1607–1639; With: The Earl of Suffolk 1607–1639; The Lord Clifford 1607–1639; The Earl of Dunbar 1607–1611; The Earl of Northumberland 1626–1639; The Earl of Arundel 1632–1639; Lord Maltravers 1632–1639	Succeeded by The Earl of Arundel; Lord Maltravers
Vacant Title last held by The Earl of Cumberland	Lord Lieutenant of Northumberland; 1607–1639; With: The Earl of Suffolk 1607–1639; The Lord Clifford 1607–1639; The Earl of Dunbar 1607–1611; The Earl of Northumberland 1626–1639; The Earl of Arundel 1632–1639; Lord Maltravers 1632–1639	Succeeded by The Earl of Northumberland
Vacant Title last held by The Earl of Cumberland	Lord Lieutenant of Westmorland; 1607–1641; With: The Earl of Suffolk 1607–1639; The Lord Clifford 1607–1642; The Earl of Dunbar 1607–1611; The Earl of Northumberland 1626–1639; The Earl of Arundel 1632–1639; Lord Maltravers 1632–1639	Succeeded by The Earl of Cumberland
Peerage of England
Preceded by George Clifford	Earl of Cumberland; 1605–1641	Succeeded by Henry Clifford
