= Custos Rotulorum of Northumberland =

This is a list of people who have served as Custos Rotulorum of Northumberland.

- Robert Horsley bef. 1547–?
- Sir Robert Brandling bef. 1558–1568
- Sir John Forster bef. 1573 – aft. 1594
- Ralph Eure, 3rd Baron Eure 1596–1598
- Sir Robert Carey 1598 – bef. 1605
- Edward Talbot, 8th Earl of Shrewsbury bef. 1605–1618
- Sir Ralph Delaval 1618–1628
- William Cavendish, 1st Earl of Newcastle 1628–1632
- Sir William Widdrington 1632–1646
- Interregnum
- William Widdrington, 2nd Baron Widdrington 1660–1675
- Henry Cavendish, 2nd Duke of Newcastle 1675–1688
- Richard Lumley, 1st Earl of Scarbrough 1689–1721
- Richard Lumley, 2nd Earl of Scarbrough 1722–1740
- Charles Bennet, 2nd Earl of Tankerville 1740–1753
- Hugh Percy, 1st Duke of Northumberland 1753–1786
- Hugh Percy, 2nd Duke of Northumberland 1786–1800
- William Cavendish-Bentinck, 3rd Duke of Portland 1800–1802
- Hugh Percy, 2nd Duke of Northumberland 1802–1817

For later custodes rotulorum, see Lord Lieutenant of Northumberland.
