= George Clifford, 3rd Earl of Cumberland =

English noble (1558–1605)

George Clifford KG
- Earl of Cumberland
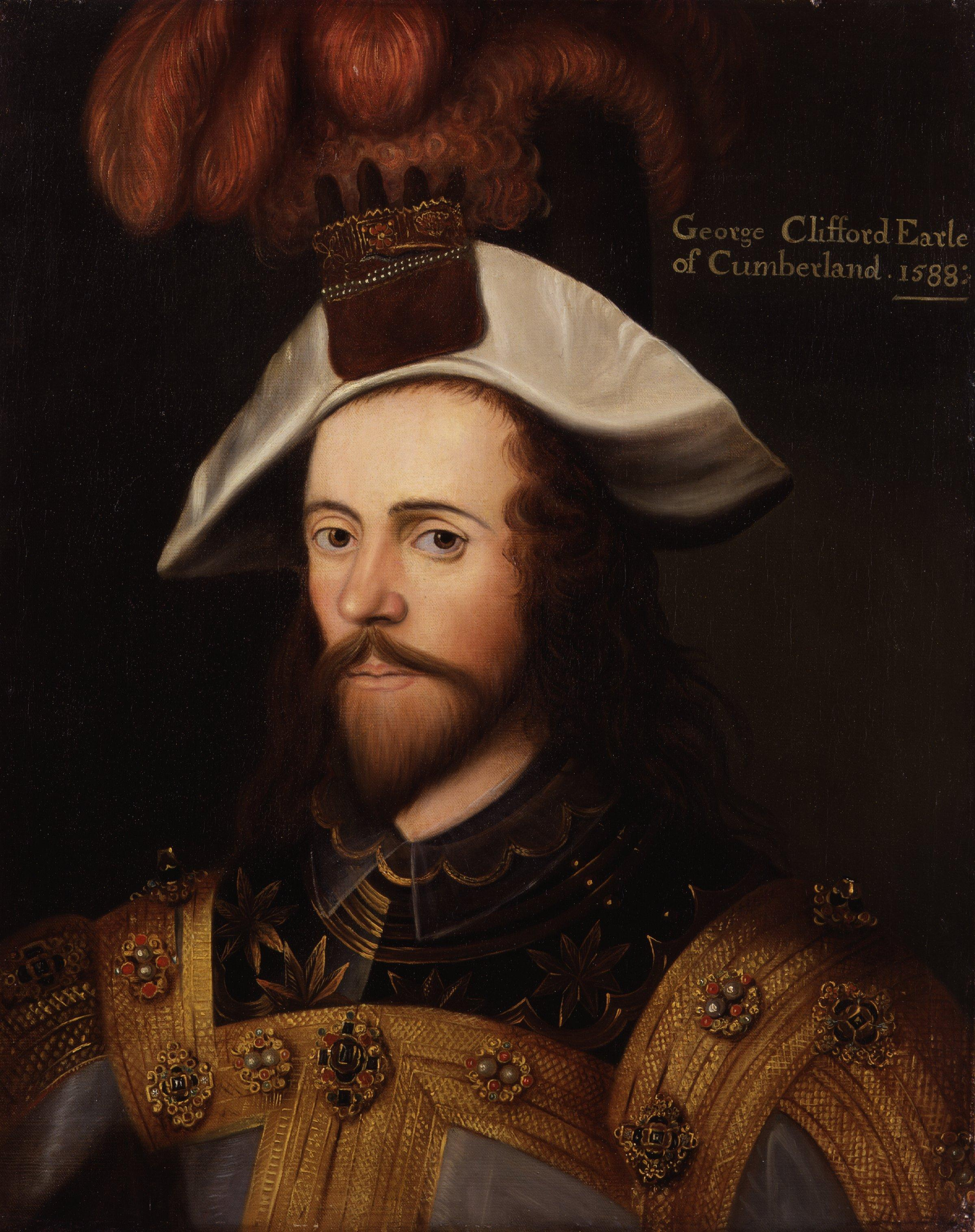
- George Clifford, 3rd Earl of Cumberland, after Nicholas Hilliard
- Tenure: January 1570 – 30 October 1605
- Predecessor: Henry Clifford, 2nd Earl of Cumberland
- Successor: Francis Clifford, 4th Earl of Cumberland
- Other titles: 13th Baron de Clifford; 13th Lord of Skipton
- Born: 8 August 1558; Brougham Castle, Westmorland, England
- Died: 30 October 1605 (aged 47); Liberty of the Savoy, London, England
- Residence: Appleby Castle; Brougham Castle; Skipton Castle; Londesborough Hall
- Wars and battles: Battle of San Juan
- Spouse: Lady Margaret Russell
- Issue: Anne Clifford, 14th Baroness de Clifford suo jure
- Parents: Henry Clifford, 2nd Earl of Cumberland; Anne Dacre

British Governor of Puerto Rico
- In office 21 June – 13 August 1598
- Monarch: Elizabeth I
- Secretary of State of England: Robert Cecil
- Preceded by: Antonio de Mosquera (as Spanish governor)
- Succeeded by: John Berkeley

George Clifford, 3rd Earl of Cumberland, 13th Baron de Clifford, 13th Lord of Skipton (8 August 1558 – 30 October 1605), was an English peer, naval commander, and courtier of Queen Elizabeth I of England. He was notable at court for his jousting, at the Accession Day Tilts, which were highlights of the year at court. Two famous survivals, his portrait miniature by Nicholas Hilliard (c. 1590, now National Maritime Museum) and a garniture of Greenwich armour (now at the Metropolitan Museum of Art), reflect this important part of his life. In contrast, he neglected his estates in the far north of England and left a long succession dispute between his heirs.

== Early life and wardship ==
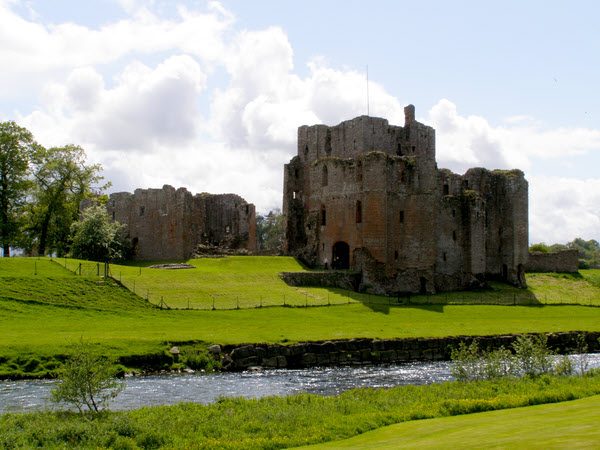
Brougham Castle, birthplace of George Clifford, a residence of the Clifford family since the late 13th century

George Clifford was born on 8 August 1558 at Brougham Castle in Westmorland, the son and heir of Henry Clifford, 2nd Earl of Cumberland (d. January 1570) by his second wife, Anne Dacre (c. 1538 – died c. July 1581), daughter of William Dacre, 3rd Baron Dacre.

The Barons de Clifford, a junior branch of the Clifford feudal barons of Clifford of Clifford Castle in Herefordshire, had established themselves in the late 13th century at Appleby Castle in Westmorland, in the north of England.

George succeeded as Earl of Cumberland and Baron de Clifford when his father died in 1570, leaving George a minor, aged 12. His valuable wardship and marriage was granted by Queen Elizabeth I to Francis Russell, 2nd Earl of Bedford, KG (died 1585), who in 1577, married George off to his daughter Lady Margaret Russell (1560–1616). The marriage had been arranged in their infancy by their respective fathers, which later did not prove to be a happy one.

== Life at court ==
Life at court meant that George spent an increasing amount of time in southern England, away from his family's estates. As a result, Brougham Castle, one of his properties in the north, was neglected and abandoned. Although in 1589, he built the original Londesborough Hall, an Elizabethan country house located in East Riding of Yorkshire. George's fellow courtier commented on his northern upbringing, writing to the steward of Robert Devereux, 2nd Earl of Essex, that he disliked Clifford as "the rudest Earll by reson of his northerly bringen up".

George Clifford was described as a man of great personal beauty, strong and active, accomplished in all knightly exercises, splendid in his dress, and of romantic valour. On the other hand, he was a gambler and a spendthrift, a faithless husband, and later, for several years before his death, was separated from his wife.

== Queen's Champion and KG ==
Quartered arms of Sir George Clifford, 3rd Earl of Cumberland

Clifford rose in the world as an accomplished jouster, and became Queen Elizabeth's second Champion on the retirement of Sir Henry Lee of Ditchley. A portrait miniature by Nicholas Hilliard, around 1590, commemorates the appointment, showing him in tilting attire with the Queen's glove, set in diamonds, pinned as a plume to his hat as a sign of her favour. He sat as a Peer in the trial of Mary, Queen of Scots. The Queen made him a Knight of the Garter in 1592, and Clifford was also involved in the formation of the East India Company.

== Naval career ==
Clifford was a man of irregular life, and having run through a great part of his very handsome property, seized on the opportunity offered by the war with Spain to re-establish himself. In 1588, he commanded the galleon Elizabeth Bonaventure in the Anglo-Spanish War, during which he had had some success. His portrait was included in the Armada Tapestries.

He led and invested in a number of expeditions, but many were turned back due to storms or lack of prizes. His first success was an expedition to the Azores in 1589, taking a number of Portuguese and Spanish prizes. He suffered losses in the Battle of Berlengas Islands in 1591, and in 1592 he helped to prepare an expedition with Walter Raleigh, which led to the Battle of Flores, and the capture of the richly laden Portuguese ship, Madre de Deus, off Flores Island in the Azores. At the end of 1593, Clifford financed three ships for a further expedition to the Azores, which resulted in the action of Faial between the English and a joint Iberian/Portuguese fleet.

Clifford later commissioned the building of his own ship, the 38-gun Scourge of Malice. During the Battle of San Juan in 1598, he achieved fame for having captured Fort San Felipe del Morro, the citadel protecting San Juan, Puerto Rico. Clifford and his force of men had arrived in Puerto Rico on 15 June 1598, but by November of that year had withdrew from the island due to severe bouts of dysentery which started to plague his men.

Clifford was often spoken of as a sort of nautical Quixote, a title curiously unsuitable to the courtier, gambler, and buccaneer, in all of which guises history presents him. His love of adventure was strong, and he staked his money on the success of his cruises in much the same spirit that he did on the speed of his horses or the turn of his dice. And he spared his body no more than his purse. His courage was unimpeachable, and the temper which he showed in times of difficulty, won him both credit and popularity. All the great wealth he gained from his buccaneering, he lost in jousting and horse racing, and was eventually obliged to sell his inherited lands.

In April 1600, the Admiralty Court heard evidence that the Swann, a pirate vessel that seized a French trade ship in 1599, was owned by the Earl. England and France were at peace, and the Earl had no Letters of Reprisal from the Admiralty, but it is unknown if any action was taken against him.

== Marriage, children and succession dispute ==
In 1577, George married Lady Margaret Russell (1560–1616), a daughter of his guardian Francis Russell, 2nd Earl of Bedford and Margaret St John. Earl Russell had acquired his valuable wardship, as well as the right to marry George off to whomsoever he chose. By his wife Margaret, George had the following children:

- Francis Clifford (1584 – 8 December 1589)
- Robert Clifford (21 September 1585 – 24 May 1591)
- Lady Anne Clifford, suo jure 14th Baroness de Clifford (30 January 1590 – 22 March 1676), his daughter and sole heiress, and wife of Richard Sackville, 3rd Earl of Dorset.

Clifford's two sons, Robert and Francis, had both died young, before the age of 6, thus his only surviving child and daughter Anne became his sole heiress. She inherited the title Baron de Clifford suo jure, having been created by writ in 1299 to be able to descend in the female line. She also inherited £15,000. The vast majority of his estate, however, Clifford bequeathed to his brother Francis Clifford, 4th Earl of Cumberland, who also inherited the earldom, which by the letters patent of its creation was precluded from passing to a female, as was usual. After lengthy litigation, Clifford's daughter Anne won much of the land, including Brougham and Appleby castles.

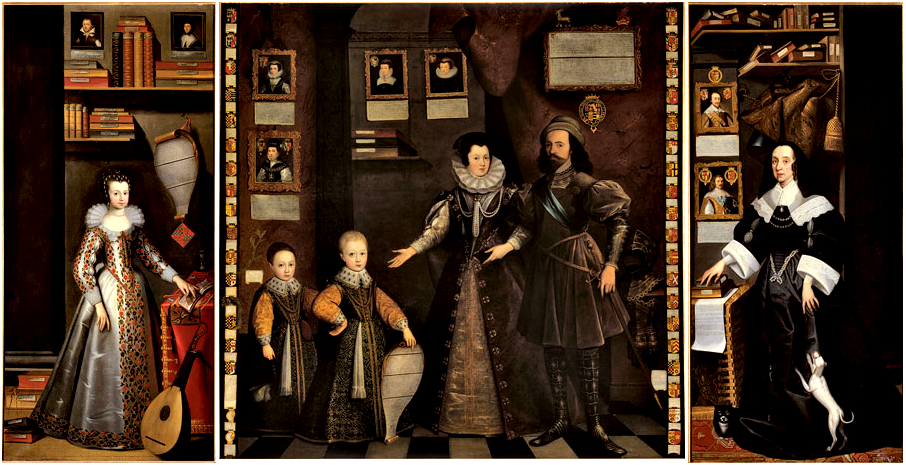
The Great Picture, 1646. Anne Clifford as a girl at left and as a mature woman at right. The central panel shows her parents and young brothers.

The Great Picture is a large triptych group portrait, measuring 8 ft 5" high and 16 ft 2" wide, commissioned in 1646 by Lady Anne Clifford, attributed to Jan van Belcamp (1610–1653). It formerly hung in Appleby Castle and is now displayed at the Abbot Hall Art Gallery in Kendal, Cumbria. It depicts Lady Anne as a girl, on the left, and as a mature woman, on the right. The central panel shows her parents and her small brothers. The painting is replete with significant elements, referring to her life and to her succession to her paternal inheritance, gained after a lengthy legal dispute, only settled in 1617. The House of Lords postponed the hearing of the matter of the barony, which remained dormant until 1678, when Nicholas Tufton, 3rd Earl of Thanet, was allowed to claim the peerage and become the fifteenth Baron de Clifford.

The 3rd and 4th Earls of Cumberland are frequently erroneously associated with the progenitors of the Clifford name in early New England; neither man emigrated to the new world, nor did other known members of the Cumberland Branch of Cliffords.

== Death and burial ==
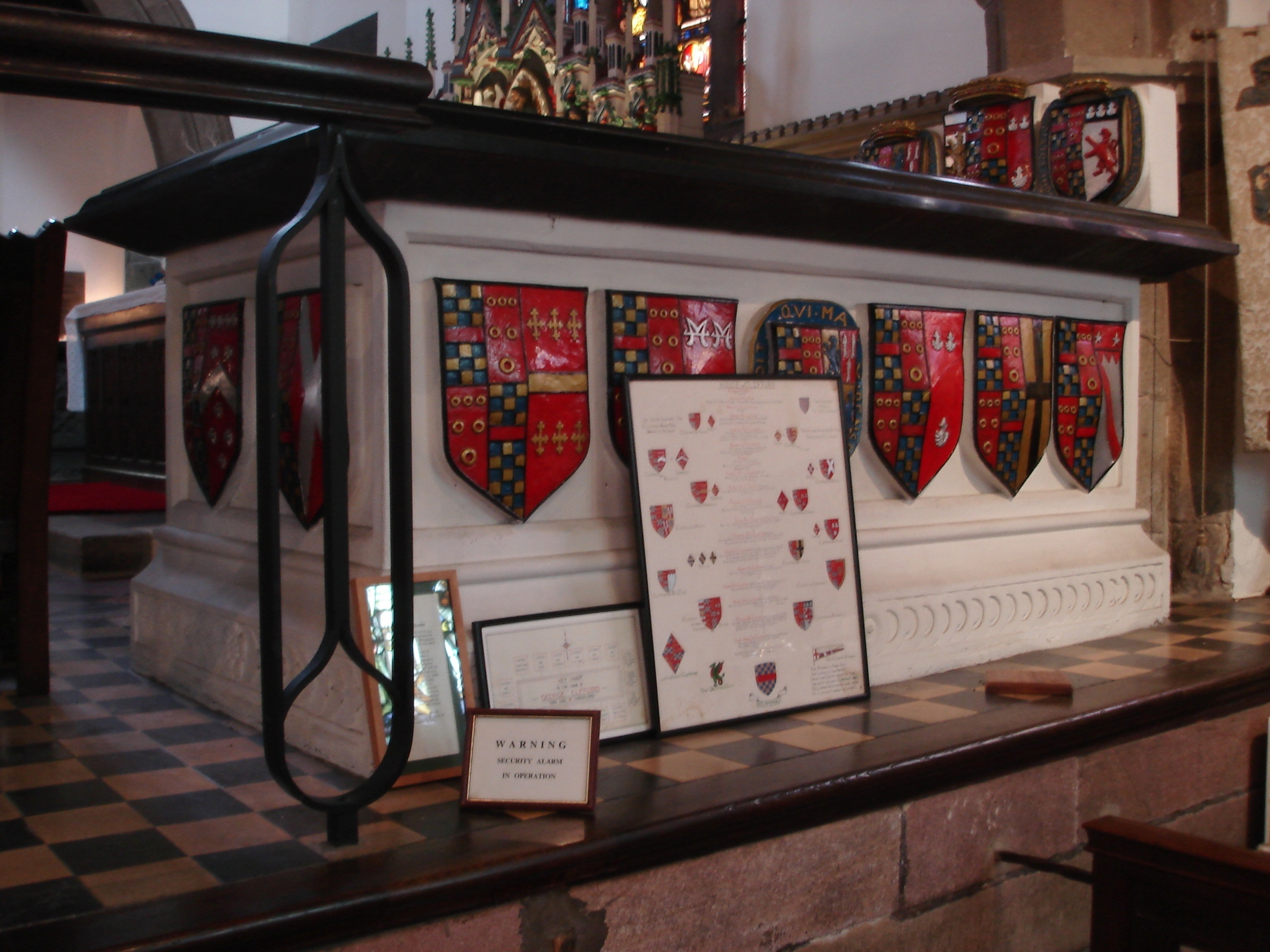
Chest tomb of George Clifford in Holy Trinity Church, Skipton

George Clifford died on 30 October 1605 at the duchy house of the Savoy in London. His body was embalmed and buried in the family vault at Skipton Castle in Craven, Yorkshire, his family seat, where a black marble altar tomb to his memory was erected by his daughter, Lady Anne Clifford. Also, his chest tomb monument survives in Holy Trinity church, Skipton, adjacent to the castle. It is profusely decorated with heraldry, showing the arms of Clifford quartering Vipont (the feudal barons of Appleby, from whom the Cliffords inherited Appleby Castle and vast estates in Westmorland), impaling the arms of Russell as well as the wives of Clifford's paternal predecessors: Beauchamp, de Roos, Percy, Dacre, Berkeley, Neville, etc.

== Suit of armour ==
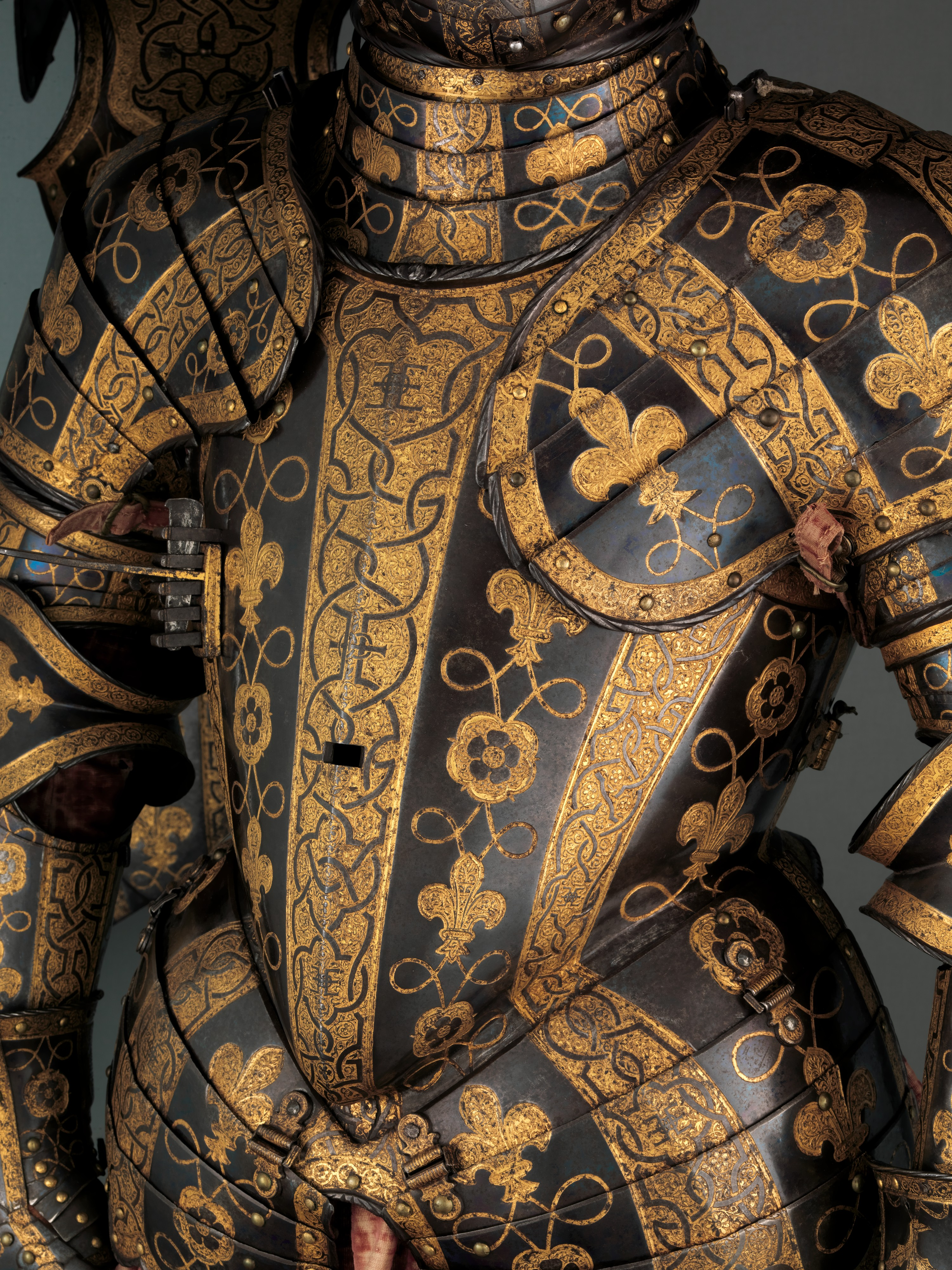
Sir George Clifford's tournament armour, Metropolitan Museum of Art, New York

The Cumberland harness comprises the following pieces: a armet, a gorget, a breast- and back-plate, the taces and tassets, and the complete leg defenses inclusive of sollerets. The jambs, are not laminated above the ankle, but are of one piece. The pieces for the tilt are an additional close helmet, a grand guard, a reinforcing piece for the left elbow, four vamplates for the lance, and a reinforcing mezeil for the helmet. The horse armor of the suit, consisting of two sets of bow saddle, steels, one set of cantle saddle steels, the chanfron with small crinet, and the stir ups. In the Tower is an unfinished mezeil which appears to be a piece of this suit, on it the rose and fleur-de-lis are recessed, but no engraving has been executed.

In the centre of all the pieces is a broad vertical band of gilt floriated scrolls etched, protected by being slightly recessed below the surface the conventional interlaced strapwork being raised and left in blue, thus contrasting with the gilded diaper groundwork. The double cypher of Queen Elizabeth, of two E's adossés connected by two entwined annulets, is also blue, and shows out conspicuously from the rest; two of these monograms occur on all the principal portions of the suit; on each side of the vertical band are etched and gilt emblems of the Tudor family, two open cinquefoil roses with a fleur de-lis between connected by true lovers' knots. A recessed and gilt border of roses enclosed in annulets runs round the top and bottom of each piece, and narrow vertical stripes of etched and gilded scrolls divide the patterns; in these borders are the rivets, with latten heads, which secured the linings in position.

== In literature ==
In Virginia Woolf's novel Orlando: A Biography, the "Earl of Cumberland" discovers Orlando and his lover asleep amongst his cargo and believes them to be ghosts sent to punish him for buccaneering. In his terror, the Earl vows to mend his ways and, in repentance, founds a row of almshouses. Although not explicitly stated, the Earl referred to must be the 3rd Earl, due to the relevant action in the novel occurring shortly after the death of Queen Elizabeth I.

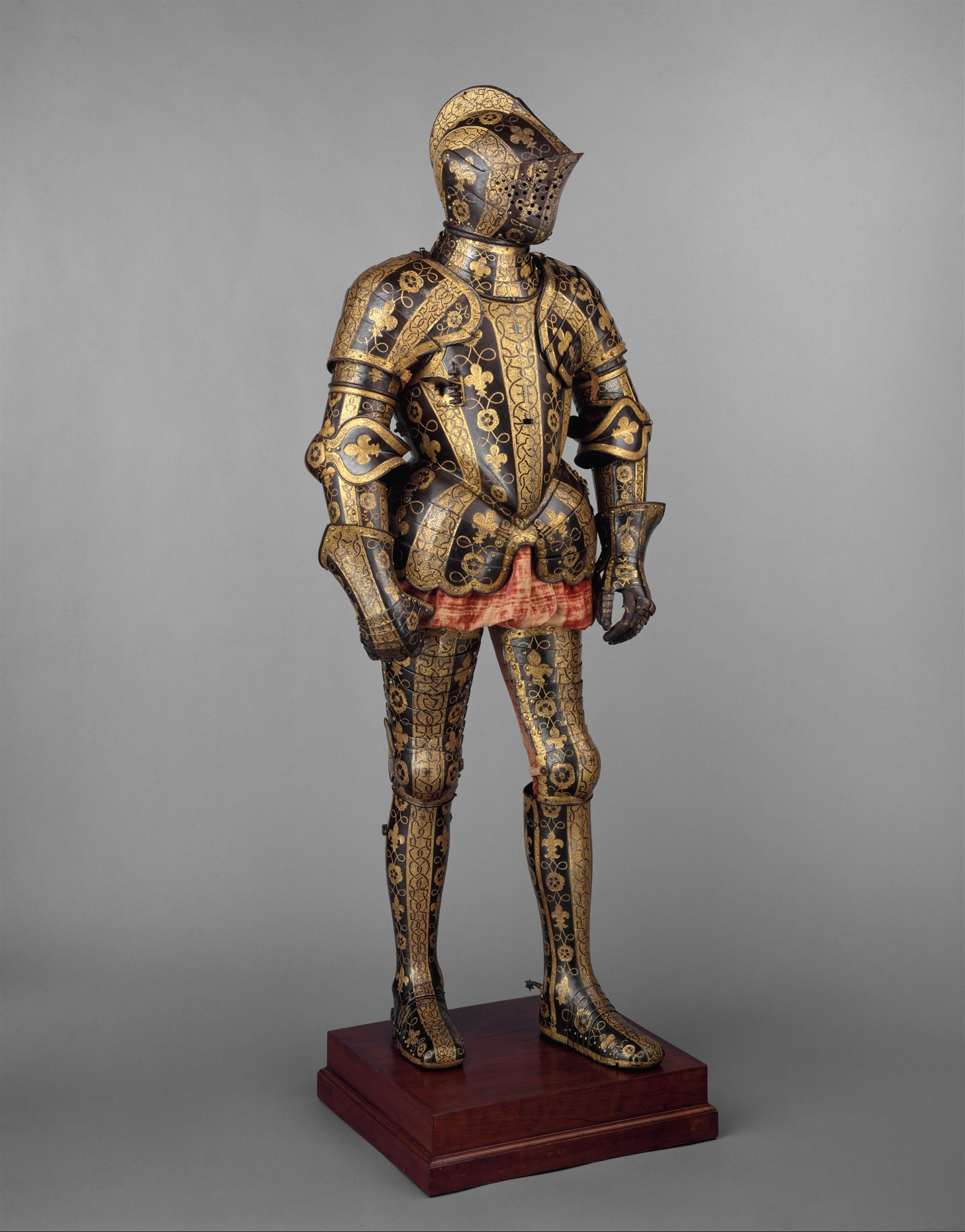
The full armour in New York

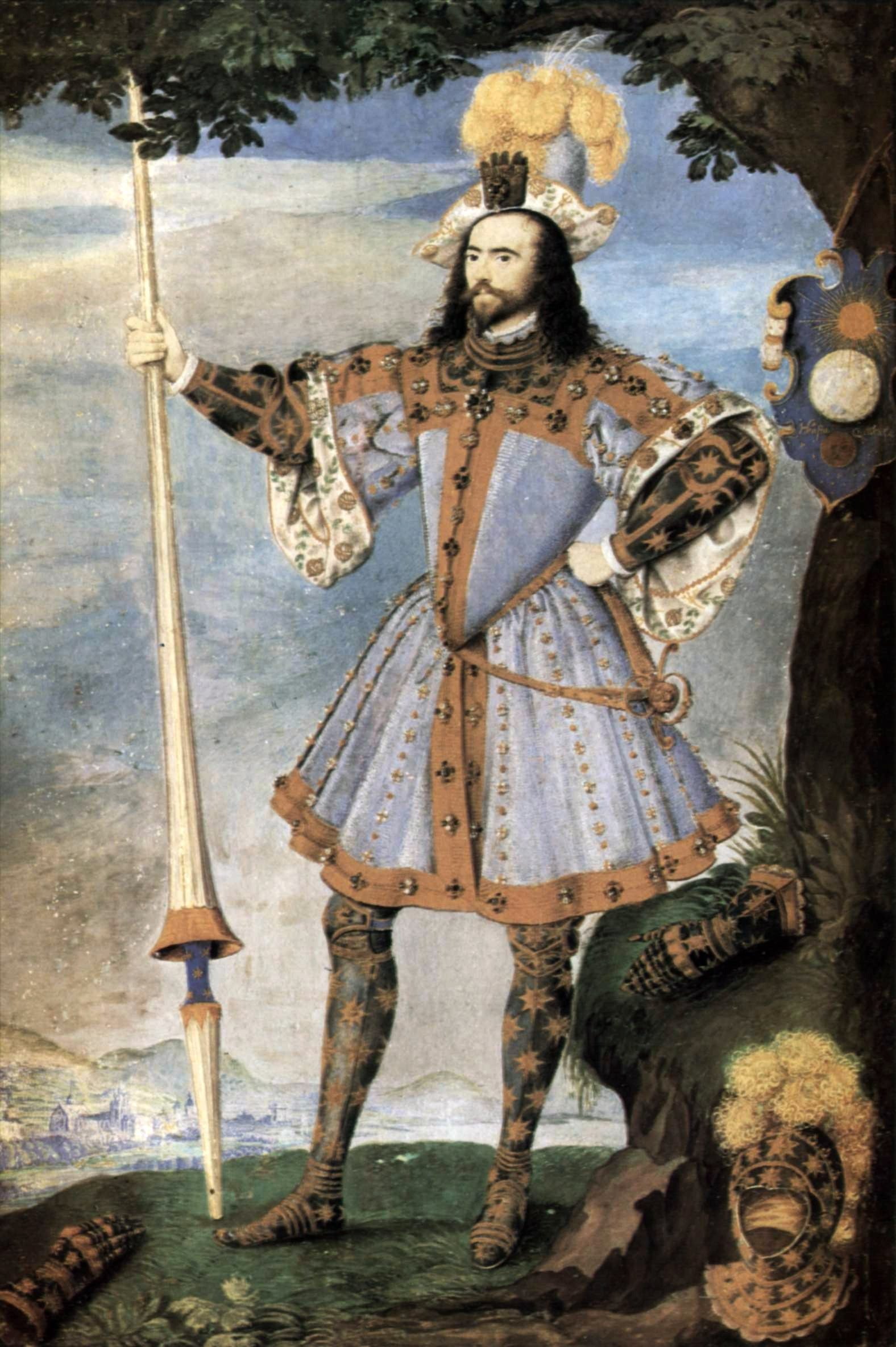
A full-body portrait of Clifford

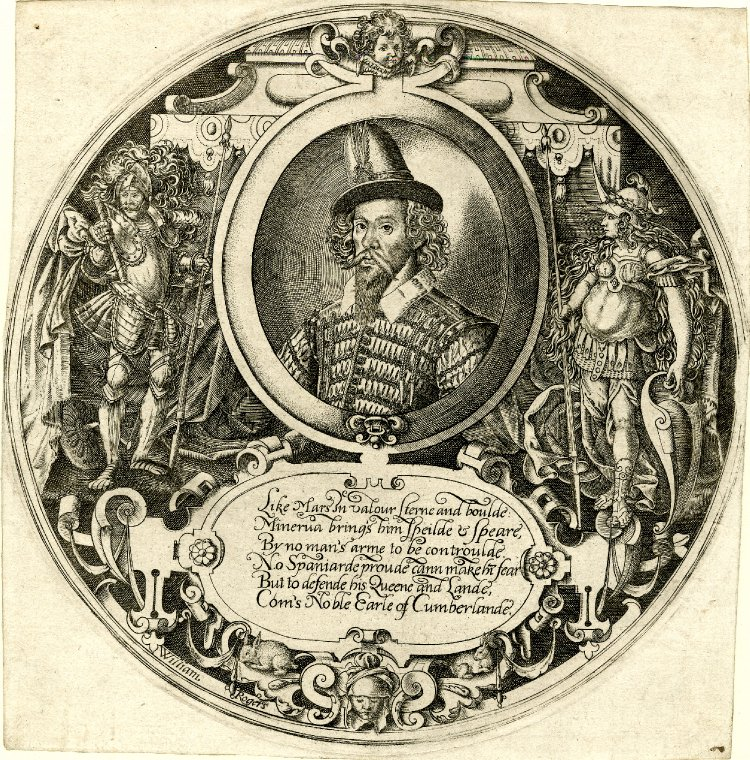
Engraved portrait by William Rogers

Arms of de Clifford: Chequy or and azure, a fesse gules

== Ancestry ==
Ancestors of George Clifford, 3rd Earl of Cumberland

16. John Clifford, 9th Baron de Clifford
8. Henry Clifford, 10th Baron de Clifford
17. Margaret Bromflete
4. Henry Clifford, 1st Earl of Cumberland
18. Sir John St. John of Bletso
9. Anne St. John
19. Alice Bradshaigh
2. Henry Clifford, 2nd Earl of Cumberland
20. Henry Percy, 4th Earl of Northumberland
10. Henry Percy, 5th Earl of Northumberland
21. Lady Maud Herbert
5. Lady Margaret Percy
22. Robert Spencer of Spencer CombeSir Robert Spencer
11. Catherine Spencer
23. Lady Eleanor Beaufort
1. George Clifford, 3rd Earl of Cumberland
24. Humphrey Dacre, 1st Baron Dacre
12. Thomas Dacre, 2nd Baron Dacre
25. Mabel Parr
6. William Dacre, 3rd Baron Dacre
26. Sir Robert de Greystock
13. Elizabeth Greystoke, Baroness Greystoke
27. Lady Elizabeth Grey
3. Hon. Anne Dacre
28. John Talbot, 3rd Earl of Shrewsbury
14. George Talbot, 4th Earl of Shrewsbury
29. Lady Catherine Stafford
7. Lady Elizabeth Talbot
30. William Hastings, 1st Baron Hastings
15. Anne Hastings, Countess of Shrewsbury
31. Lady Katherine Neville

Neither George Clifford, 3rd Earl of Cumberland, other members of the Cliffords of Cumberland branch, nor any of the earl's offspring, are known progenitors of the early New England settlers of the same surname. Much genealogical confusion has occurred due to the frequent repetition of first names amongst the various branches of the House of Clifford.

Political offices
Vacant Title last held by The Earl of Huntingdon	Lord Lieutenant of Cumberland, Northumberland and Westmorland; 1603–1605	Vacant Title next held by The Earl of Cumberland
Peerage of England
Preceded by Henry Clifford	Earl of Cumberland; 1570–1605	Succeeded by Francis Clifford
Preceded by Henry Clifford	Baron de Clifford; 1570–1605	Dormant Title next held by Anne Clifford
