= Hugh Hastings =

Hugh Hastings may refer to:

- Hugh Hastings (soldier, died 1347) (c.1310–1347), English administrator and soldier
- Hugh Hastings (soldier, died 1369), English soldier and noble who fought in the Hundred Years' War, son of the above
- Hugh Hastings (soldier, died 1386), English soldier and noble who fought in the Hundred Years' War, son of the above
- Hugh Hastings (playwright) (1917–2004), Australian writer and World War II naval veteran

== See also ==
- Hugh Hastings Romilly (1856–1892), British explorer in the Pacific
