= Grey v Hastings =

15th century English heraldry law case

The shield blazoned Or, a maunch gules, which was the subject of the case

Grey v Hastings (1410) was a heraldic law of arms case brought in England. The case resulted from two different families found using the same undifferenced coat of arms.

Edward Hastings of Elsing and Reginald Grey of Ruthin disputed each other's right to bear the undifferenced arms. The right to the arms was granted to Lord Grey, however, rather than being able to bear the undifferenced arms of Hastings of Sutton, he won the right to the higher status quartered arms born by his deceased cousin the Earl of Pembroke: Quarterly, 1st and 4th: Or, a maunch gules (Hastings); 2nd and 3rd: Barry of argent and azure, an orle of martlets gules (Pembroke) (shown below).

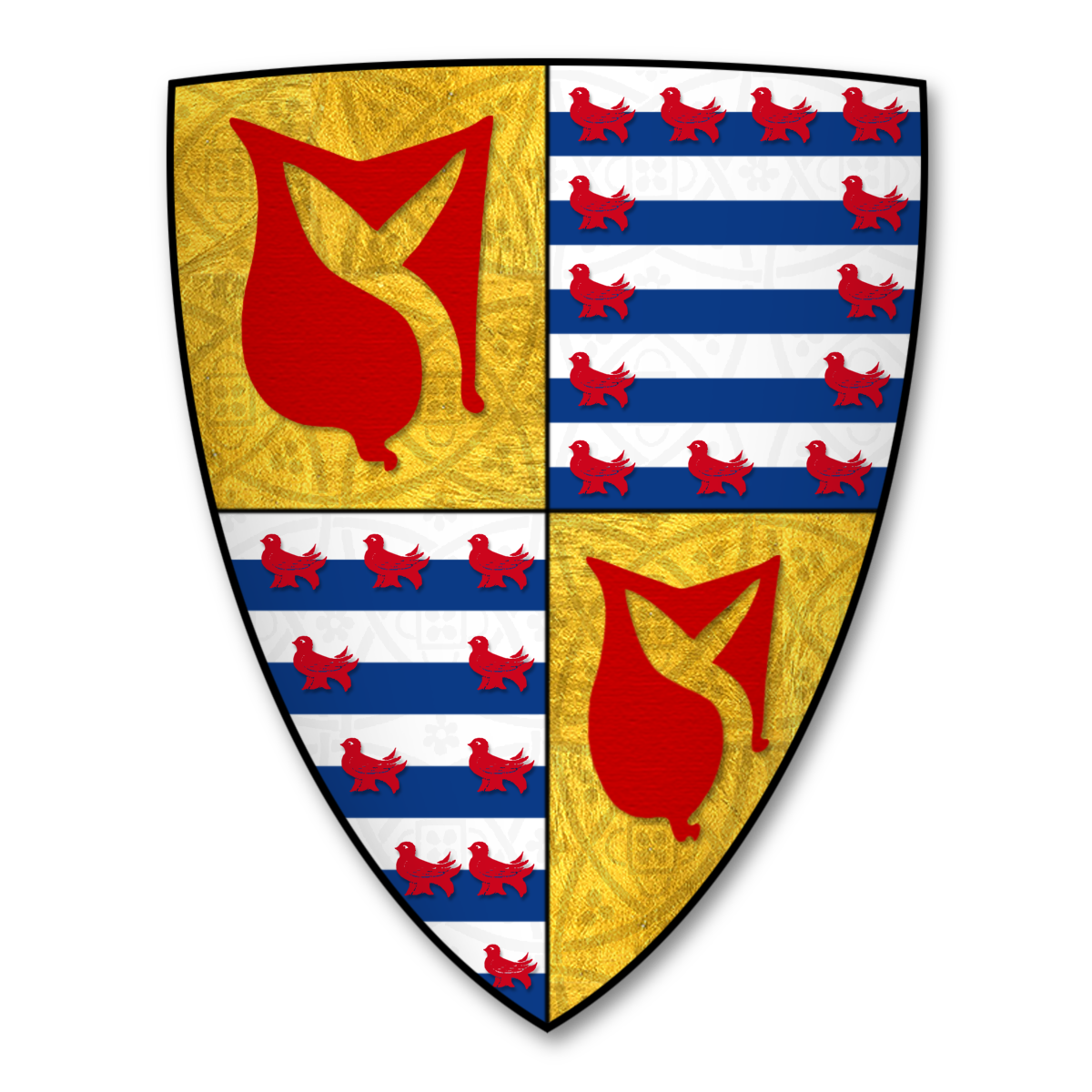
Arms borne by John Hastings, 3rd Earl of Pembroke before he died without issue during a jousting tournament at Woodstock Palace in 1389

.

Lord Hastings appealed the case, however, refused to pay court costs, to not create a presumption of acquiescence based on the contemporary rules of evidence, and was imprisoned.

== See also ==
- Court of Chivalry
- College of Arms
- Scrope v Grosvenor
- Warbelton v Gorges
