= Hugh Hastings III =

14th century English noble

Arms of Hugh Hastings: Quarterly 1st and 4th: Or, a maunch gules, a label of three argent (Hastings of Elsing); 2nd and 3rd: Gules, a bend argent (Foliot).

Hugh Hastings III (died 1386/1387), Lord of Elsing, Brisley and Grimston, was an English soldier and noble who fought in the Hundred Years' War.

Hugh III was the eldest son of Hugh Hastings II and Margery de Everingham. He was knighted by John of Gaunt on the Great Chevauchée to France in 1373. He bore the same arms as his grandfather, Hugh Hastings I: those of Hastings with a label, quartered with those of Foliot. He served in the English expeditions to Brittany in 1378 and 1379. He travelled throughout the eastern Mediterranean, visiting Jerusalem and Rhodes. According to Robert de Fishlake, who accompanied him, he left an escutcheon of his arms everywhere he stayed. He took part in the English invasion of Scotland in 1385.

In 1386, he gave evidence in the case of Scrope v Grosvenor, a famous heraldric law dispute. His son Edward would later be involved in his own heraldic law dispute with Lord Reginald Grey over the use of the undifferenced Hastings arms, Grey v Hastings. In 1386, Hugh also took part in the expedition with John of Gaunt to Castile. He distinguished himself at the siege of Brest on the way to Spain. He was killed in Spain.

Hugh married Anne, daughter of Edward Despenser, Lord of Glamorgan and Morgannwg and Elizabeth Deburghersh; they are known to have had the following issue:

- Hugh Hastings (died 1396), married Constance Blount, without issue.
- Edward Hastings (died 1437), married firstly Muriel Dinham, had issue, married secondly Margery Clifton, no further issue.
