= John Hastings (died 1477) =

English soldier and administrator

John Hastings (about 1412 – 1477) was an English landowner, soldier and administrator.

== Early life ==
Born about 1412, he was the son of Sir Edward Hastings (died 1438) and his first wife Muriel Dinham, daughter of Sir John Dinham (died 1428) and his first wife Eleanor Montagu (died 1396). His paternal grandparents were Sir Hugh Hastings (died 1386) and his wife Anne Despenser (died 1426).

== Career ==
In 1438, while serving with the English forces in Normandy as commander of the garrison at Saint-Lô, he learned that he had inherited his father's estates, at Elsing and Gressenhall in Norfolk and Fenwick in Yorkshire, but never pursued any claim to the other arms or titles that had dominated his father's life. Returning to Norfolk, in 1441 he was appointed Constable of Norwich Castle, which included responsibility for the gaol, on a salary of 20 pounds a year for life. In 1474 he served a year as Sheriff of Norfolk and Suffolk. He died at Elsing in 1477, and was buried beside his wife at Gressenhall, where a monument commemorated them.

== Personal life ==
In or after 1434, he married Anne Morley (died 1471), daughter of Thomas Morley, 5th Baron Morley (died 1435) and his wife Isabel de la Pole (died 1467). As they were related, they had to plead ignorance of the link and apply for legitimation of existing and future children. Their children included:

- Sir Hugh Hastings (died 1488), who was MP for Yorkshire in 1472 and Sheriff of Yorkshire in 1479.
- Elizabeth Hastings, who married Sir Robert Hildyard, of Winestead.
