= St Mary's Church, Elsing =

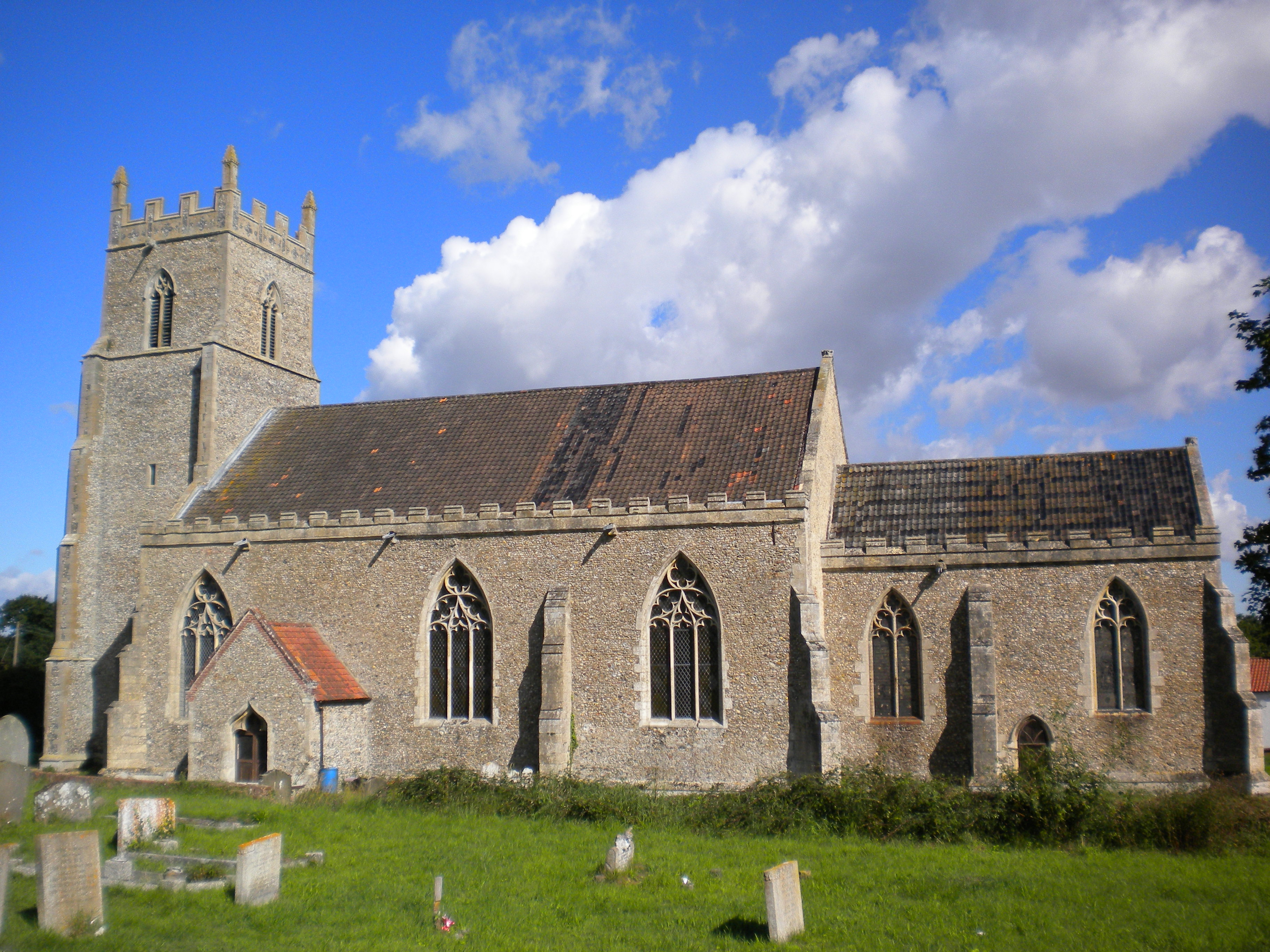
- St Mary's church from the south
- St Mary's Church, Elsing
- 52.7076°N 1.0355°E
- OS grid reference: TG 05170 16539
- Location: Elsing, Norfolk
- Country: England
- Denomination: Church of England

History
- Status: Parish church
- Dedication: Saint Mary

Architecture
- Functional status: Active
- Heritage designation: Grade I
- Designated: 30 May 1960
- Style: Decorated Gothic

Administration
- Province: Canterbury
- Diocese: Diocese of Norwich
- Archdeaconry: Lynn
- Deanery: Sparham
- Parish: Elsing: St Mary

St Mary's is an Anglican parish church in Elsing, in the Breckland district of Norfolk, England. The 14th-century church was built to a single plan in Decorated Gothic style by a local knight and has remained largely unaltered to the present day. The church contains a brass monument of national importance, a tall medieval font cover and rood screen paintings. The chancel retains some stained glass contemporary with the construction of the building.

== History ==
Elsing is recorded as having a church, endowed with 18 acres (7.3 ha) of land, in the Domesday Book of 1086. The church was rebuilt by Sir Hugh de Hastings, and his wife Margaret in around 1330 to a single uniform plan. Sir Hugh, whose maternal grandfather was the powerful earl Hugh le Despenser, was summoned to parliament by King Edward III, with whom he was on good terms and who seems to have been a mourner at Hugh's funeral, as shown on his monumental brass. Some masonry from an earlier church survives in the west wall of the nave. Wall paintings discovered around 1860 and subsequently plastered over showed four scenes in the story of John the Baptist in 14th-century style. The first scene, which seems to have been hastily plastered over, was said by the rector to have shown Herodias dancing before Herod, with her attitude "rollicking and bent to the ground, so that her auburn hair touched the very ground." Of the other scenes which were traced and recorded at the time, scene two showed John the Baptist preaching before Herod and Herodias, and scene three John coming from the prison, watched by Herodias wearing 14th-century style shoes. Scene four was described as the best preserved, showing John about to be decapitated.

Lying on a medieval pilgrimage route to Walsingham the church also venerated St Anne, who is shown teaching the Virgin in a painted rood screen panel. Another panel shows the Visitation, with Elizabeth shown in a nun's habit.

In the 20th century a small organ built by Norman and Beard in 1901 was installed in the north-east corner of the nave.

== Architecture ==
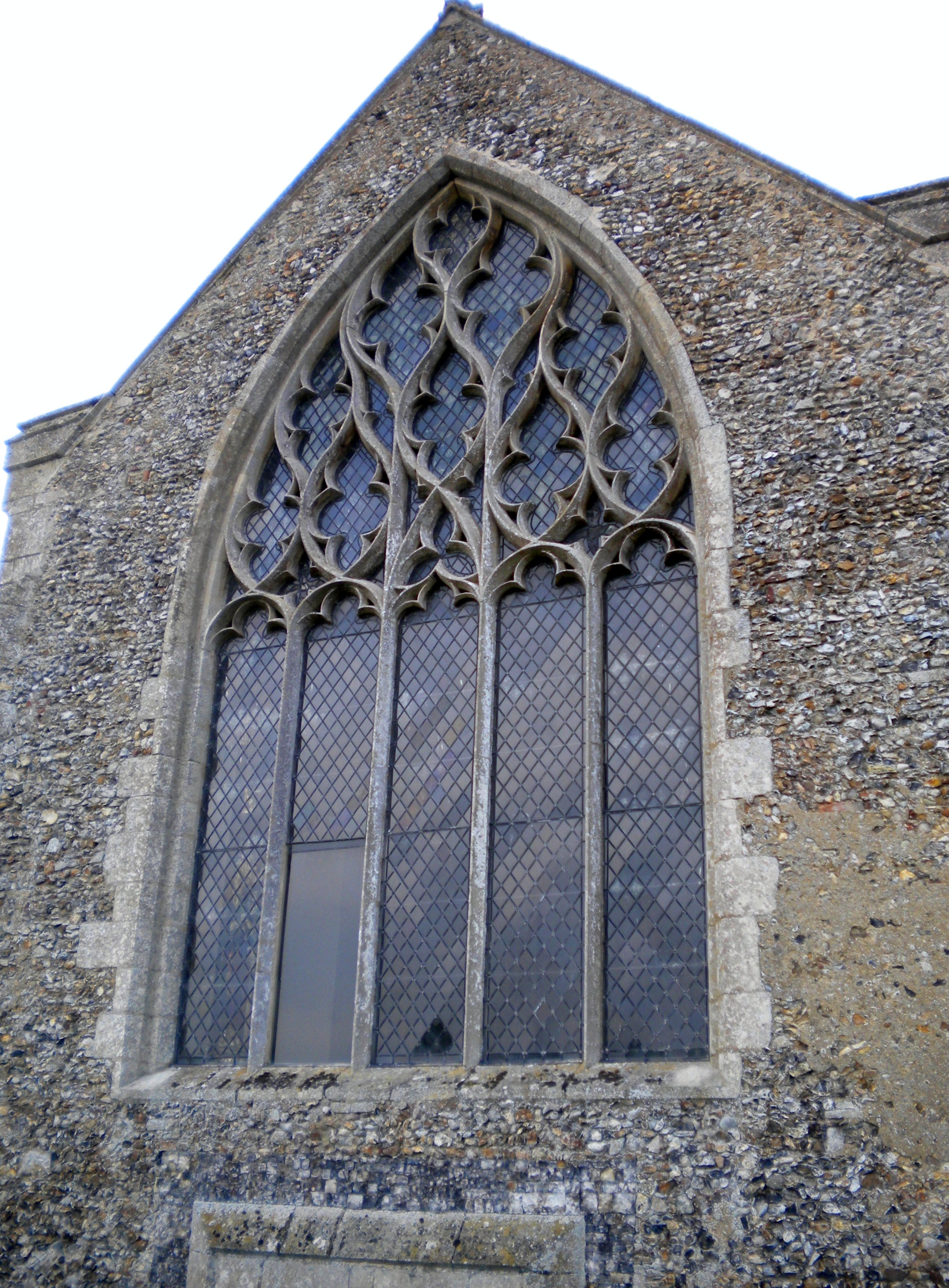
The east window

The church is built of flint with stone dressings and stands at the centre of a rectangular churchyard. The tower at the western end has battlements with an early example of flushwork panelling. The bell openings have reticulated tracery, with two minor reticulation units within the major one. The nave, without pillars or aisles, is nearly 40 feet (12 m) wide, the widest among Norfolk's parish churches, giving a large preaching space as pioneered by the mendicants. The nave and chancel have battlemented parapets and a pantiled roof built in 1781, supported by kingposts on arched ties, which solved earlier problems caused by the width of the nave. The nave has three large three-light windows on each side with Curvilinear tracery based on the petal motif. The west door is of Perpendicular style opening into the nave through a tall narrow tower arch. There are both north and south doors with porches, all having boldly cusped ogee arches. The floor is of buff pamment stone.

The chancel has a five-light east window with intricate Curvilinear tracery and three other two-light windows. Now with mostly plain glass the east window was recorded in the 1860s as having figures of Sir Hugh and Lady de Hastings holding a model of the church. The south-east window contains a small stained glass figure of the Virgin from a Coronation dating from the building of the church and a slightly later apostle in red and brown of about 1375. The south-west window has two complete apostles, one in green and yellow and the other in brown and lilac. The plain sedilia and piscina niche have ogee arches. In the southeast corner is a vestry with a Y-tracery window. Against the south wall is the tomb-chest of Dame Anne Browne (died 1623) with a black marble lid and an inscription in black lettering on the wall. The brass of Sir Hugh Hastings has been lifted from the church floor and mounted on a plinth at the centre of the chancel.

== Hastings brass ==
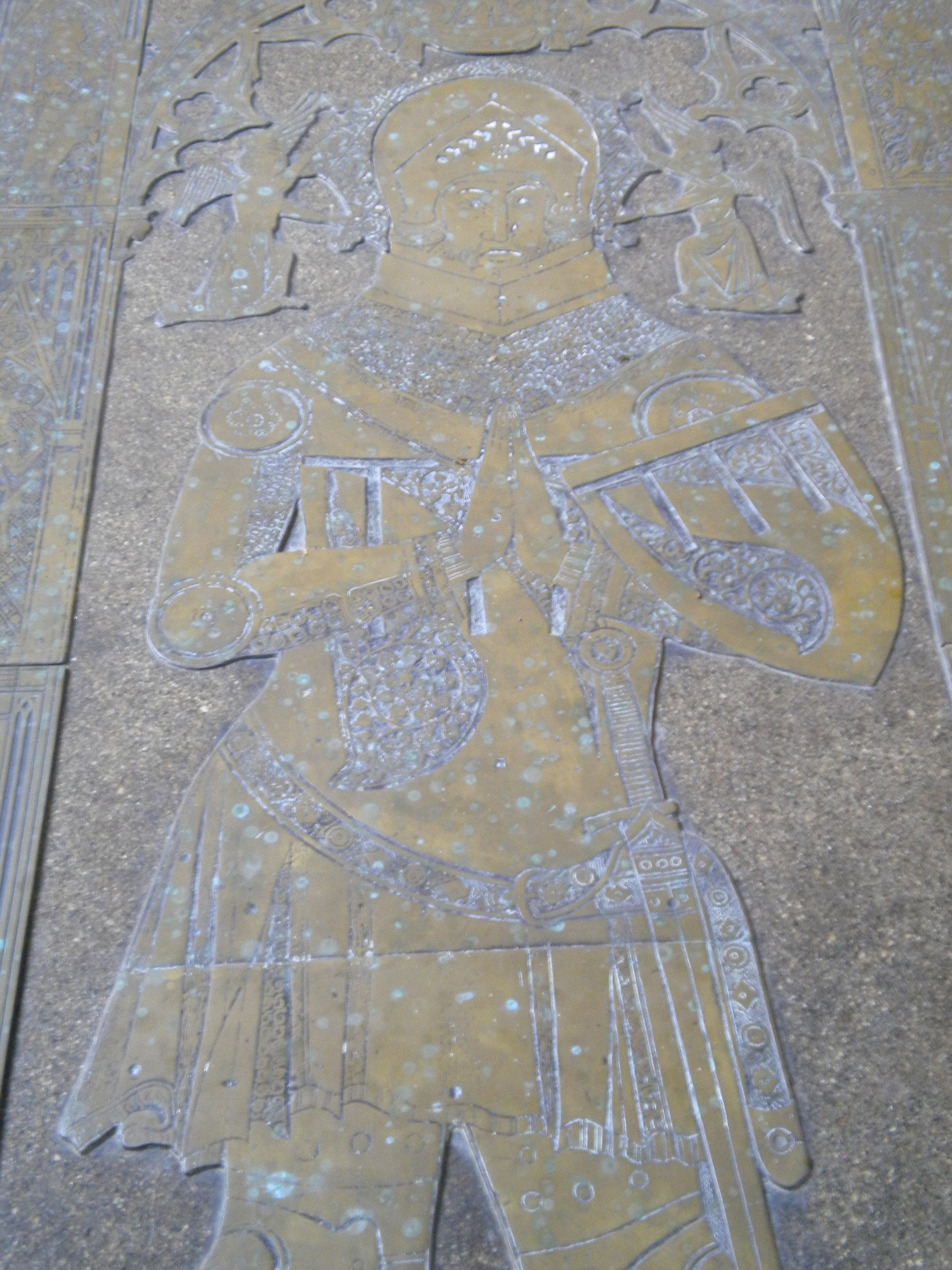
The replica brass memorial of Sir Hugh Hastings

The brass memorial to Sir Hugh Hastings (died 1347), the largest of all English church brasses, has been described by Nikolaus Pevsner as “the most sumptuous of all English church brasses”. With some parts missing, it shows a 5 feet 6 inches (1.68 m) long figure in armour with hands together in prayer while two angels hold his pillows. In the cusped arch above tiny angels receive his soul. In a gable above this is a mounted St George spearing a devil in an octofoiled circle. Above this are two plaques with the Coronation of the Virgin between two angels in the corners. To the left and right four tiers of mourning figures represent Edward III, Thomas Beauchamp Earl of Warwick, Lord Grey of Ruthyn, Henry Plantagenet Earl of Lancaster, the Earl of Pembroke, Hugh le Despenser, Ralph de Stafford, and Almeric, Lord St Amand. Pembroke and Despenser are now missing.

Originally decorated with coloured glass and coloured pastes, the brass is now mounted on a low plinth at the centre of the chancel and kept covered for protection. A replica which can be used for brass rubbings is displayed in the north-west corner of the nave.

== Font and font cover ==
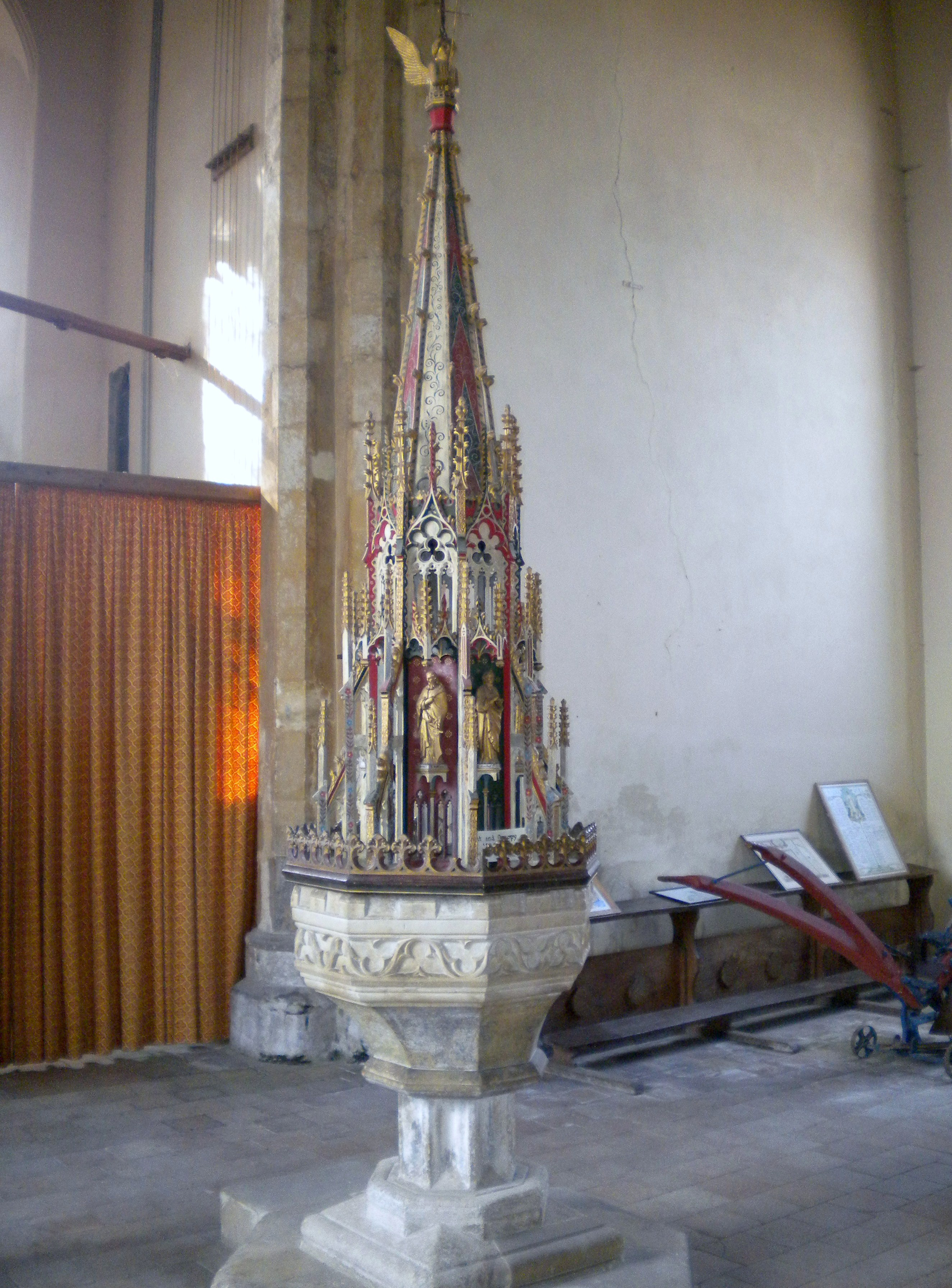
The font and cover

The single-stemmed Decorated style octagonal font has each wave of a frieze filled with an ogee trefoil and with battlements above. Suspended by a rope from the roof above is a tall and highly ornate font cover in Perpendicular Gothic style with carved figures, some original, in niches between diagonal pierced vanes with rich crocheting topped by a spire and winged angel.

== Bells ==
The tower contains a ring of five bells, hung for change ringing, however as of 2010 the bells are not ringable. The second, third and fifth bells were cast in 1622 by William and Alice Brend, the fourth in 1660 by Elias Brend and the treble in 1705 by Thomas Newman. The second, third and fourth are listed by the Church of England as being of historical significance as good examples of their respective founders' work, and the frame in which the bells hang is also regarded as being historically important.

== The church today ==
The church is part of a group of parishes which also includes All Saints, Bawdeswell, St Mary, Bylaugh, St Thomas, Foxley and St Mary, Sparham. The building was granted Grade I listed status on 30 May 1960.
