= Edward Hastings (died 1437) =

English landowner and soldier

Sir Edward Hastings (died 1437) was an English landowner and soldier who fought in the Hundred Years' War but spent much of his life and fortune on unsuccessful claims to hereditary honours.

== Origins ==
Born on 21 May 1382 at the family property of Fenwick in Yorkshire, and baptised that day at Campsall, he was the second son of Sir Hugh Hastings (died 1386) and his wife Anne Despenser (died 1426), daughter of Edward Despenser, 1st Baron Despenser (died 1375) and his wife Elizabeth Burghersh (died 1409). His paternal grandparents were Sir Hugh Hastings (died 1369) and his wife Margaret Everingham (died 1375).

== Career ==
His father, a noted soldier and supporter of John of Gaunt, Duke of Lancaster, died on the duke's campaign in Galicia in 1386 and his elder brother Hugh died at Calais in 1396 without leaving children. This left him at age 14 heir to his father and also theoretical heir in the male line to John Hastings, 3rd Earl of Pembroke and 5th Baron Hastings, who had died childless after a jousting injury in 1389. Most of the lands and titles of the earl had however passed to Reginald Grey, 3rd Baron Grey of Ruthin (died 1440), whose descent was through the female line.

In 1399, shortly after the coronation of John of Gaunt's son as King Henry IV, he was knighted and was enrolled as a king's knight with a salary of 40 pounds a year until he came into his inheritance. On the king's expedition to Scotland in 1400 he was serving with Grey, who challenged his right to bear the Hastings arms of Or, a maunch gules and, after initiating a law suit the next year even though Hastings was not yet 21, in 1403 had him imprisoned in the Tower of London. In 1404 he ceded to the king the rights his father had held from John of Gaunt in the manor of Sutton Scotney, which had been concealed since 1386, and in 1404 was preparing to serve abroad under the king's son Thomas of Lancaster, Duke of Clarence. After long preliminaries a hearing of Grey's case began in 1407 and the judgement, when eventually given in 1410, was victory for Grey with costs against Hastings, who lodged an appeal.

Before the coronation in 1413 of the next king, Henry V, he claimed the hereditary rights to carry the great gilt spurs and the second sword and to act as the king's naperer. Not only were these claims disallowed but for a second time he was imprisoned in the Tower of London and not set free until the following year.

There was still no hearing of his appeal against Grey and he had not paid the costs. After service abroad in Normandy during 1415 and 1416, in the retinue of Thomas Beaufort, Earl of Dorset, in 1417 he challenged the costs due to Grey and was ordered to pay the huge sum of 987 pounds. When he refused to pay, claiming that to do so would be to accept Grey's rights, he was imprisoned in the Marshalsea and remained there, sometimes in irons like a common criminal, until shortly after January 1434. Finally paying enough to satisfy Grey, who cancelled the balance, he died on 6 January 1438.

Over 400 years after his death, having suffered imprisonment and impoverishment rather than renounce his rights, a court decided in 1841 that he had in fact been Baron Hastings ever since 1396 and that the arms and title he claimed had therefore been inherited by his descendants.

== Family ==
First married to Muriel Dinham, daughter of Sir John Dinham (died 1428), of Hartland, and his first wife Eleanor Montagu (died 1396), they had a son John Hastings, born about 1412, who in 1438 inherited his father's estates at Fenwick, Grimston and Wellow in Nottinghamshire and Mossley in Yorkshire, but never made any claim to the arms or titles that had occupied so much of father's life.

Before 1427 he married secondly Margaret Clifton (died 1456), daughter of Sir Robert Clifton, of Old Buckenham, and his wife Alice. They had no children and after his death she married as his first wife Sir John Wyndham (died 1475), of Felbrigg and Runton.
