= Margaret Grey =

Cambro-Norman noblewoman

- Born: c. 1397; Ruthin Castle, Denbighshire, Wales
- Died: after April 1426 and before October 1427
- Noble family: Grey
- Spouse: William Bonville, 1st Baron Bonville
- Issue: Philippa Bonville (uncertain) (Note: There is conflicting evidence regarding Philippa's relationship to William Bonville. The only two 17th-century sources differ: a Heraldic visitation of 1620 states that she was his sister, but William Pole (1561–1635) recorded that she was his daughter. Scholars continue to disagree which is correct, see for example Roskell, 1993, and Weis, 1999.); William Bonville; Margaret Bonville; Elizabeth Bonville
- Father: Reginald Grey, Knt., 3rd Baron Grey de Ruthyn
- Mother: Margaret de Ros

Margaret Grey (c. 1397 – after April 1426 and before October 1427) was a Cambro-Norman noblewoman, the daughter of Reginald Grey, 3rd Baron Grey de Ruthyn, a powerful Welsh Marcher Lord, who was the implacable enemy of Owain Glyndŵr.

Margaret was the first wife of William Bonville, K.G., first Lord Bonville, who was decapitated by Queen consort Margaret of Anjou following the Yorkist defeat at the Second Battle of St Albans.

== Family ==
Margaret Grey was born in Ruthin Castle, Denbighshire, Wales circa 1397, daughter of Reginald Grey, Knt., 3rd Baron Grey de Ruthyn (c. 1362 – 1440) and Margaret de Ros (c. 1363 – c. 1413/4). She had two full-blooded brothers and two full-blooded sisters. Her elder brother was Sir John Grey, K.G., who married Constance Holland, the granddaughter of John of Gaunt. Her paternal grandparents were Reginald Grey, 2nd Baron Grey de Ruthyn and Alianore Le Strange of Blackmere, and her maternal grandparents were Thomas de Ros, 4th Baron de Ros and Beatrice de Stafford.

Her father was a powerful Marcher Lord of the Welsh Marches. It was his dispute with Owain Glyndŵr over a piece of moorland called the common of Croisau that caused the latter's rebellion against King Henry IV of England. Margaret's father was taken prisoner by Glyndŵr in January 1402, and ransomed for the sum of 10,000 marks which was paid by King Henry. In September 1400, the town of Ruthin had been razed to the ground by the Welsh in revenge for the destruction of Glyndŵr's manor of Sycharth by Grey and his men; however, the castle was left standing, and its inhabitants unharmed.

On 7 February 1415, Margaret's father married, secondly, Joan de Astley, by whom he had another six children.

== Marriage and issue ==
On 12 December 1414, Margaret Grey married William Bonville, K.G., first Lord Bonville (1392–1461), eldest son of Sir John Bonville and Elizabeth FitzRoger. She was his first wife. (Note: Vivian (1895), p. 102 states, "Sir William Bonville of Chewton [...] = Margaret, da. of ... Meriet." However, in Weis (1985), "Margaret, da. of Meriet" was identified as Margaret, the daughter of Reynold Grey, Knt., 3rd Lord Grey of Ruthin and his 1st wife, Margaret de Ros by Robert Behra based on Calendar Close Rolls, 1413–1419, p. 199.) They made their home at the Manor of Chewton Mendip, in Somerset, and had several children:

- Philippa Bonville (uncertain) (living 1464). She married twice, firstly after 12 May 1427, to William Grenville (died c. 1450), of Bideford, Devon and Kilkhampton, Cornwall. Her second marriage, by 1451, was to John Almescombe.
- William Bonville, Esq. (died 30 December 1460), married Elizabeth Harington, by whom he had one son, William Bonville, 6th Baron Harington of Aldingham, who in his turn married Katherine Neville; they were the parents of Cecily Bonville, Marchioness of Dorset. William Bonville, Esq., and his son, the 6th Baron Harington were both slain and left dead on the field during the Yorkist defeat at the Battle of Wakefield.
- Margaret Bonville (died before July 1487), married Sir William Courtenay (c. 1428 – September 1485) of Powderham (Bonville's ally against the latter's cousin the Earl of Devon of Tiverton Castle), by whom she had four sons and one daughter:
- Elizabeth Bonville (died 14 February 1491), married Sir William Tailboys, by whom she had at least one son, Sir Robert Tailboys (1451 – 10 January 1495).

Margaret Grey's husband, William Bonville, K.G., first Lord Bonville, was knighted before 1417 during the campaigns in France of King Henry V. He was Knight of the Shire for Somerset in 1421, and for Devon in 1422, 1425 and 1427. In 1423, he was appointed by the king as Sheriff of Devon. On 8 February 1461, he was elected as a Knight of the Garter.

Margaret Grey herself died sometime after April 1426 and before October 1427. Her husband married secondly about 9 October 1427 to Elizabeth Courtenay, the daughter of Edward Courtenay, 3rd Earl of Devon. Lord Bonville and Elizabeth Courtenay had no issue. On 10 March 1449, he received a writ of summons to Parliament as Lord Bonville of Chewton and became 1st Baron Bonville.

== Bibliography ==
- Cokayne, George Edward. The Complete Peerage edited by Vicary Gibbs. Vol. II. (London: St Catherine Press, 1912).
- Costain, Thomas B. The Last Plantagenets. (New York: Popular Library, 1962).
- Dalton, John, M.A., F.S.A. The Collegiate Church of Ottery St Mary. (Cambridge, 1917).
- Edmondson, Joseph, Esq., F.S.A. A Complete Body of Heraldry. Vol. I. (London, 1780).
- Faris, David. Plantagenet Ancestry of Seventeenth-Century Colonists. 2nd ed. (Boston: New England Historic Genealogical Society, 1999).
- Hoskins, W. G. A New Survey of England: Devon. (Newton Abbot, Devon: David & Charles (Publishers) Ltd., 1972).
- Pole, William. Collections Towards a Description of the County of Devon. (London, 1791).
- Rogers, W.H. Hamilton. The Strife of the Roses and Days of the Tudors in the West. (Exeter, 1890).
- Roskell, J. S.; Clark, L.; Rawcliffe, C. R. The History of Parliament: The House of Commons 1386–1421. Vol. 2. (Stroud: Alan Sutton Publishing, 1993).
- Vivian, Lt.Col. J.L., (Ed.) The Visitations of the County of Devon: Comprising the Heralds' Visitations of 1531, 1564 & 1620. (Exeter, 1895).
- Weis, Frederick Lewis., et al. The Magna Charta Sureties, 1215. Fifth edition. (Baltimore: Genealogical Publishing Co., Inc., 1999).
