= Richard Stucley =

Member of Parliament in England (died 1441)

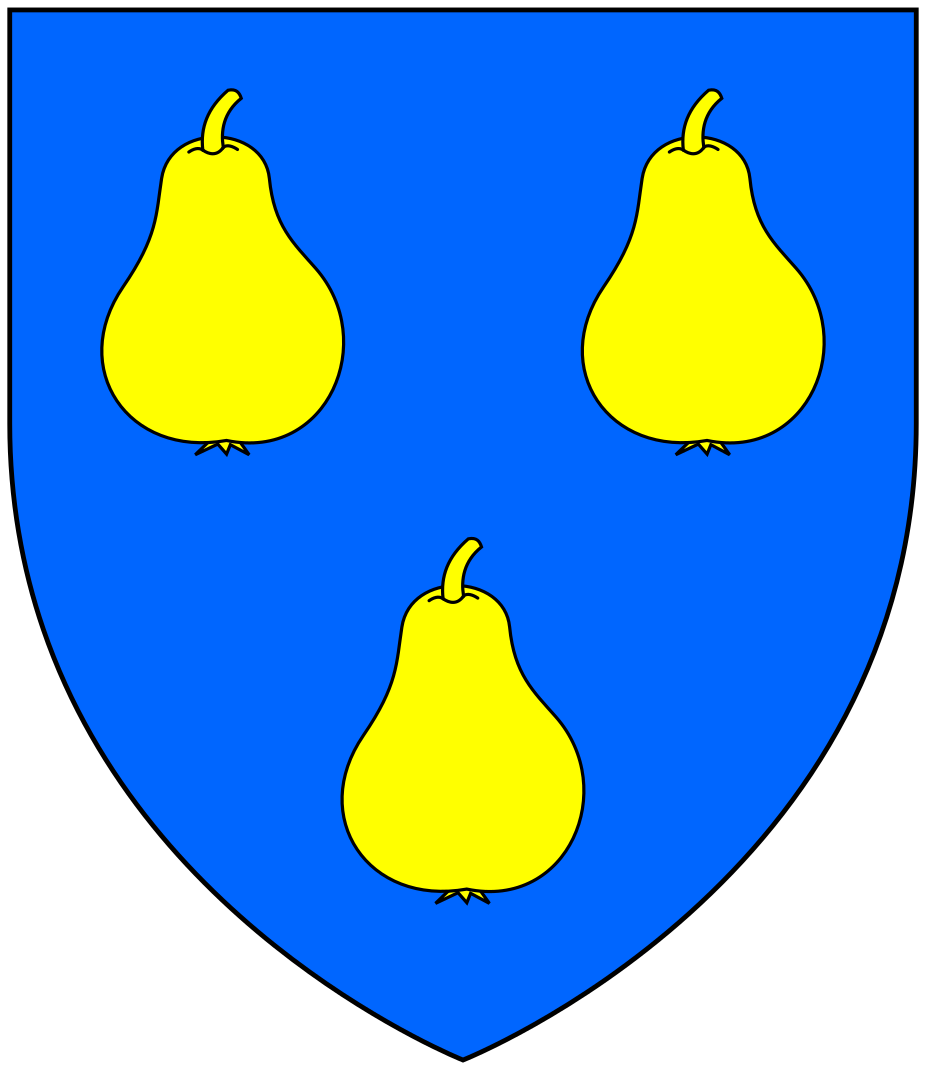
Arms of Stucley: Azure, three pears pendant or Motto: Bellement et Hardiment ("beautifully and bravely")

Richard Stucley (died 1441), of Merston and Chewton Mendip, was an English landowner, administrator and politician who married an heiress and through his son Hugh, who also married an heiress, became the ancestor of a major Devon family.

== Early life ==
Born in the 1370s, his family may have been connected with the village of Great Stukeley in Huntingdonshire.

== Career ==
He initially appears in the Royal Household of Richard II in 1396 as a king's esquire, paid by a life interest in the manor of Ridgewell in Essex, his only landholding, which yielded him 15 pounds a year. He worked with Roger Walden, the Lord High Treasurer, and his brother, the MP John Walden, on land transactions and was also involved at the Court of Exchequer.

In 1397 his fortunes were transformed through marrying a widow who brought him estates in at least six counties yielding an income of over 100 pounds a year. Her lands included: Chewton and Trent in Somerset; Merston in Sussex; part of West Kington in Wiltshire; Mapperton in Dorset; Selling, Kent; and Glen Magna in Leicestershire.

As a considerable and wealthy landowner, from 1398 on he undertook various responsibilities in local government, primarily in Sussex and Somerset or adjoining counties. In Sussex, through the MP Sir William Percy he came under the patronage of the local magnates, the Earls of Arundel, first Richard and then from 1406 Thomas.

In 1412 he was Collector of Customs for Chichester as well as escheator for Somerset and Dorset, in 1416 a justice of the peace for Sussex, and in 1418 on the Commission of Array for both Sussex and Surrey, raising troops for the war in France. He was chosen as Member of Parliament for Sussex in 1415, March 1416 and 1417.

In 1413 he had been asked to take on the feoffeeship of the West Country estates of William Botreaux, 3rd Baron Botreaux, and he later did a similar service for Thomas Camoys, 1st Baron Camoys.

In 1414 his wife died and by a settlement the two had made in 1410 he was able not only to retain her estates for life but also to pass some on to their elder son Roger. This arrangement was challenged by his elder stepson William, who obtained judgements which by 1422 stripped Stucley of all his late wife's lands except possibly for a part of Merston. Though no longer a significant landowner, he was not impoverished and, while no longer seeking public office, his credit was still good for private transactions with noble and gentry associates such as Lord Botreaux, the MP Sir Richard Stafford, and Sir Edward Stradling.

He died shortly before 28 November 1441.

== Marriage and children ==
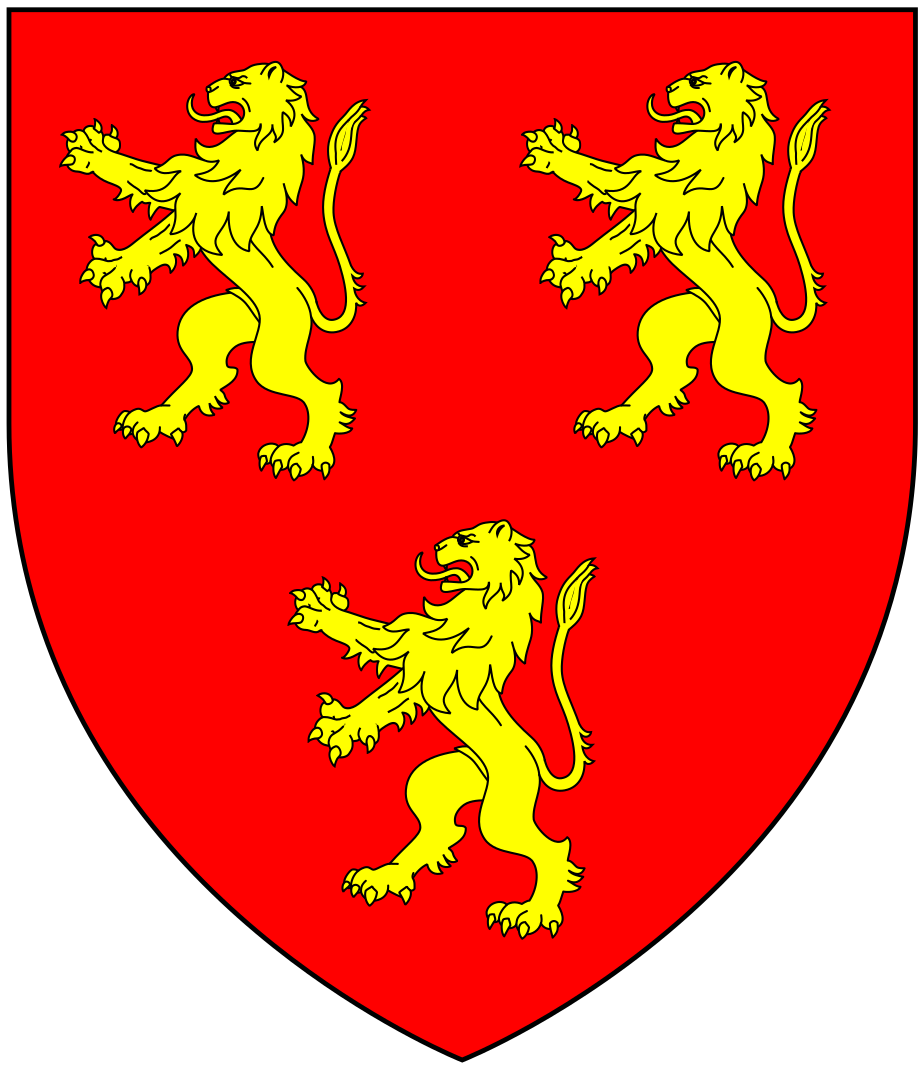
Arms of FitzRoger: Gules, three lions rampant or. These arms were subsequently quartered by the Stucley family and are visible in stained glass in King's Nympton church in Devon.

By an agreement dated 6 December 1396, he married Elizabeth (1370–1414), widow of Sir John Bonville (died 21 October 1396) and daughter and sole heiress of John FitzRoger (died before 1372), of Chewton, and his wife Alice (died 1426). Elizabeth's paternal grandfather was Sir Henry FitzRoger (died 1352), of Chewton, who married Elizabeth Holland (died 1387), daughter of Robert Holland, 1st Baron Holand. As well as the FitzRoger lands she had inherited, Elizabeth brought him three or four Bonville stepchildren: William, later 1st Baron Bonville, Thomas, Isabel, and possibly Philippa.

He and Elizabeth had two known children:

- Roger (born c. 1397), who does not seem to have lived long.
- Hugh (c. 1398 – 1457), High Sheriff of Devon in 1448, who married Catherine Affeton, heiress of the Affeton estate in Devon, and founded a family that was prominent in the West Country for generations.
