= William Bonville, 1st Baron Bonville =

English noble

William Bonville
- 1st Baron Bonville
- Successor: Cecily Bonville
- Born: 12 or 31 August 1392; Shute Manor, Shute, Devon
- Died: 18 February 1461 (aged 68); Following the Second Battle of St Albans
- Noble family: Bonville
- Spouses: Margaret Grey; Elizabeth Courtenay
- Issue Detail: Philippa Bonville (Note: There is conflicting evidence regarding Philippa's relationship to William Bonville. See Margaret Grey (Bonville's first wife) for details.); William Bonville; Margaret Bonville; Elizabeth Bonville; John Bonville (illegitimate)
- Father: Sir John Bonville
- Mother: Elizabeth Fitzroger

William Bonville, 1st Baron Bonville (Note: Occasionally spelt Bonneville.) (12 or 31 August 1392 – 18 February 1461), was an English nobleman and an important, powerful landowner in south-west England during the Late Middle Ages. Bonville's father died before Bonville reached adulthood. As a result, he grew up in the household of his grandfather and namesake, who was a prominent member of the Devon gentry. Both Bonville's father and grandfather had been successful in politics and land acquisition, and when Bonville came of age, he gained control of a large estate. He augmented this further by a series of lawsuits against his stepfather, Richard Stucley. Bonville undertook royal service, which then meant fighting in France in the later years of the Hundred Years' War. In 1415, he joined the English invasion of France in the retinue of Thomas, Duke of Clarence, Henry V's brother, and fought in the Agincourt campaign. Throughout his life, Bonville was despatched on further operations in France, but increasingly events in the south-west of England took up more of his time and energy, as he became involved in a feud with his powerful neighbour Thomas Courtenay, Earl of Devon.

In 1437, King Henry VI granted Bonville the profitable office of steward of the Duchy of Cornwall. This had traditionally been a hereditary office of the earls of Devon, and the Earl was enraged at its loss. The dispute soon descended into violence, and Bonville and Courtenay ravaged each other's properties. The situation was exacerbated in 1442 when the Crown appointed Courtenay to effectively the same stewardship it had appointed Bonville, which inflamed the situation even more. The feud between them continued intermittently for the next decade. Generally, Henry and his government failed to intervene between the two parties; when it did, its efforts were ineffectual. On one occasion Bonville was persuaded to undertake further service in France—primarily to get Bonville out of the region—but the mission was poorly funded, a military failure, and when Bonville returned the feud reignited. In 1453, King Henry became ill and entered a catatonic state for eighteen months, heightening the political factionalism that had riven his reign.

Bonville generally seems to have remained loyal to the king, although his guiding motivation was to support whoever would aid him in his struggle against Courtenay. Their feud was part of a broader breakdown in law and order which eventually evolved into the Wars of the Roses in 1455. Bonville seems to have managed to avoid implication in the variable swings in political fortune which followed until 1460. At this point, he threw in his lot with the rebellious Richard, Duke of York. His new allegiance brought him little profit; his son was killed alongside York at the Battle of Wakefield in December 1460, while Bonville himself took part in the Second Battle of St Albans two months later on the losing side; with the new Earl of Devon watching, he was beheaded on 18 February 1461.

== Background and early life ==
The Bonvilles were one of the major gentry families of late-fourteenth-century Devon, often working in close co-operation with their neighbours. The most important of these were the Courtenay earls of Devon. Bonville's grandfather had been a retainer of the 11th Earl, Edward. The historian Christine Carpenter comments, on the family's social position, that they were of sufficiently "landed and official status to be regarded as what might be termed 'super-knights' "; she echoed the medievalist K. B. McFarlane, who had previously described the family as "a powerful and respected element in Devon...there was no need for them to stand in dread of the great, for they were not small themselves".

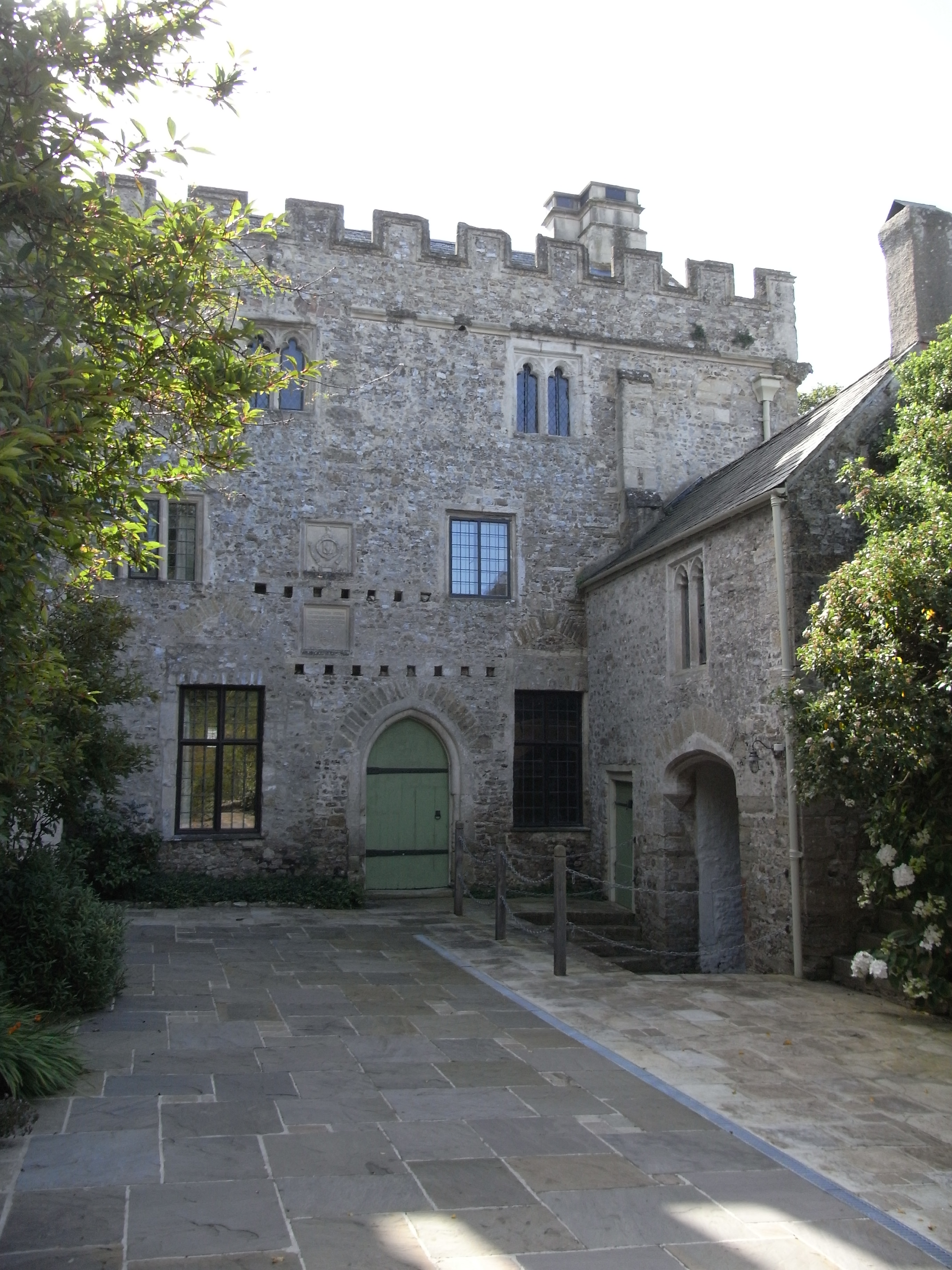
Very little of the original medieval manor house remains of Bonville's birthplace; the section shown here is from the late fourteenth century.

William Bonville was born on either 12 or 31 August 1392 or 1393 in Shute, Devon, to John Bonville (d. 1396) and Elizabeth Fitzroger (c. 1370–c. 1414). William Bonville's grandfather was his namesake Sir William Bonville, who had been member of Parliament for Somerset and Devon on multiple occasions and has been described by a historian as one of "the most prominent west-country gentry in the late fourteenth century". On hearing of the birth of his grandson, a contemporary reports, Sir William "raised his hands to heaven and praised God". Along with the Abbot of Newenham, he stood godparent to the young William. The younger William was heir to both his father and grandfather; the latter—who had married twice—had substantially expanded the family patrimony. He has been described by the scholar Ralph Griffiths as a "capable, energetic and well-connected man".

Bonville's father died when his son was four, and young William probably grew up in his grandfather's household. Grandfather Bonville died in 1408, while Bonville was still legally a minor. As was customary, King Henry IV took both Bonville's wardship and marriage into his own hands. This was valuable royal patronage, which the King granted firstly to Sir John Tiptoft, and then to Edward, Duke of York. Bonville had a younger brother, Thomas, who, by the time William came of age, had already married a cousin of Robert, Baron Poynings. This connection to the Poynings family, the historian J. S. Roskell has suggested, was instrumental in Bonville's own marriage.

=== Marriages and children ===
In 1414 he married Margaret Grey, daughter of Reginald, Baron Grey of Ruthin. Lord Grey promised to pay 200 marks (Note: A medieval English mark was an accounting unit equivalent to two-thirds of a pound.) to Bonville on the wedding day, and Bonville likewise contracted to settle estates to the value of 100 pounds on himself and his wife, jointly. Grey also paid another 200 marks in instalments over the following four years. With Margaret he had four known children:

William Bonville, who around 1443 married Elizabeth Harington, only daughter of William Harington, 5th Baron Harington.
Margaret Bonville, who married Sir William Courtenay, of Powderham.
Philippa Bonville,who married Sir William Grenville, of Stowe, whose mother was from a branch of the Courtenay family.
Elizabeth Bonville,who by November 1446 married an important Midlands landowner, Sir William Tailboys.

These marriages further enhanced Bonville's aristocratic and political connections.

After Margaret died, sometime between April 1426 and October 1427, he married Elizabeth Courtenay, widow of John Harington, 4th Baron Harington and daughter of his grandfather's associate Edward Courtenay, 3rd Earl of Devon. The couple required papal dispensation to marry because Elizabeth was already a godmother to one of Bonville's daughters and in the eyes of the church this placed her within a prohibited degree of consanguinity. Since Elizabeth was already well connected, being the sister-in-law of William Harington, 5th Baron Harington, and aunt of Thomas Courtenay, 5th Earl of Devon, this marriage greatly increased Bonville's links to the peerage.

With Elizabeth he had no known children, but with Isabel Kirkby he had an illegitimate son, John Bonville (died 1491), who married Alice Dennis. His father granted him a financial endowment in 1453, and at death bequeathed him "substantial" property.

The location of Shute, Bonville's birthplace, within Devon and England.

=== Estates and wealth ===
Bonville's father and grandfather had both had successful careers. As such, when Bonville came of age in 1414 he inherited an income of approximately £900 per annum; for context, the historian Martin Cherry says this was "a figure not far short of that enjoyed by the fifteenth-century earls of Devon themselves". His lands—comprising 18 manors—were situated all over England, although concentrated in Devon, particularly around Shute in the south-east of the county, and Somerset. These lands encompassed his grandfather's patrimony, with manors in Devon, Somerset, Dorset and Wiltshire. The Fitzroger estates were mainly in Leicestershire, the East Midlands, and the south-east of England in Kent and Sussex.

Owing to the deaths of their husbands in 1396 and 1408, respectively, Bonville's mother and grandmother each held a third of his inheritance in dower. (Note: The legal concept of dower had existed since the late twelfth century as a means of protecting a woman from being left landless if her husband died first. He would, when they married, assign certain estates to her—a dos nominata, or dower—usually a third of everything he was seised of. By the fifteenth century, the widow was deemed entitled to her dower; the historian Rowena Archer argues that this made it "one of the most destructive of baronial incidents" on account of how a long-lived dowager could reduce an inheritance over generations.) His mother had remarried in 1397, to Richard Stucley, (Note: Also spelled Styuecle.) an important Essex landowner. In 1410 she granted Stucley a life-interest in her inheritance, with remainder to their children. On her death in April 1414 Stucley thereby gained Devon lands worth around £105 per annum as well as Wiltshire manors of the Bonville estate, including the valuable manor of Chewton. Stucley based his claim on the tradition of courtesy. On reaching his legal majority, Bonville sued his stepfather for his maternal inheritance. This struggle took over six years, but he succeeded in establishing his rights to the estates by 1422. Bonville's grandmother survived until 1426; by then Bonville had also inherited substantial estates from other relatives, including a cousin and an aunt. These brought him the manors of Yelverton and Mudford Sock, and as a result, says the History of Parliament, "without doubt Bonville ranked among the very wealthiest landowners of the West Country".

== Political career and royal service ==
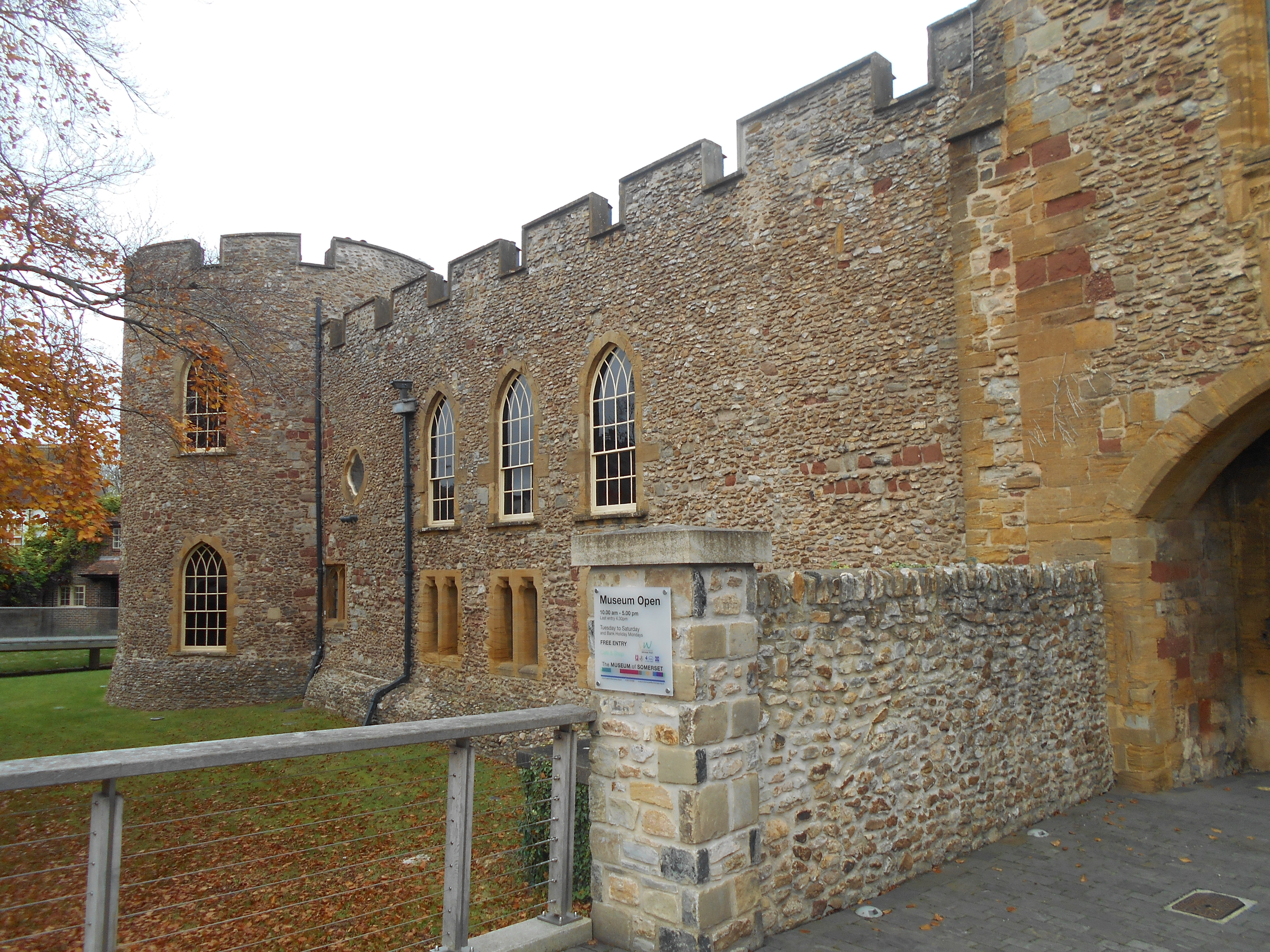
The main gate, in 2017, of Bonville's castle at Taunton, which was besieged by the Earl of Devon

Bonville undertook royal service in France in 1415, and joined Henry V's Agincourt campaign, travelling in the retinue of the King's brother, Thomas, Duke of Clarence. While in Normandy, sometime before his seventeenth birthday, Bonville was knighted. (Note: It is unknown, however, whether Bonville fought in the Battle of Agincourt itself. The historian Clifford J. Rogers notes that the numbers known to have begun the campaign had been reduced by early losses, sickness and those otherwise invalided to England after the siege of Harfleur in particular.)

In 1421, Bonville acted as one of the Duke of Clarence's executors following the latter's death at the Battle of Baugé. Roskell suggests that Bonville must have been greatly trusted by Clarence—at the time of his death, heir presumptive to the English throne—because the Duke had borrowed money from Bonville. Bonville had returned to England before May, when he attended parliament at Westminster. Henry V died in France in August 1422 leaving his six-month-old son Henry VI as his heir, and his surviving brothers, John, Duke of Bedford, and Humphrey, Duke of Gloucester, as the baby King's regents. (Note: Clarence had predeceased King Henry, having been killed at the Battle of Baugé the previous year.) The war in France continued in spite of Henry VI's youth, and Bonville returned in 1423 in Gloucester's army. Bonville fought in the campaign to regain Le Crotoy, bringing with him a retinue of ten men-at-arms and 30 archers.

On his return to England, much of Bonville's time was occupied with the administration of his estates. Extensive as they were, there was occasional friction—some of it violent—with his neighbours. In 1427 he was engaged in a bitter feud with Sir Thomas Brooke, whom Bonville—described as a "thrusting and able man"—accused of unilaterally enclosing parkland in Axmouth and obstructing roads that Bonville's tenants needed to use. The matter went to the arbitration of Bonville's godfather, the Abbot of Newenham, who found against Brooke, who had to pay all Bonville's legal costs and reverse his enclosure. By now, Bonville was also a royal official, having been appointed Sheriff of Devon in 1423, although he received few other commissions in the county before 1430. (Note: Prior to the 1430s, he was only appointed to commissions of array for Dorset in April 1418 and March 1419.) From then on he was regularly occupied with his duties as a royal official in the region: he was a justice of the peace for Devon from July 1431, for Somerset from March 1435, and for Cornwall from November 1438. Other commissions included local inquiries into necromancy, piracy, extortion, desertion (from the Earl of Warwick's fleet in 1438), felonies, smuggling and concealment of treasure.

In 1437 King Henry VI's minority ended, and he began his personal rule. Bonville was appointed to the King's Council, being described as a "King's knight". He was zealous in combating piracy off the Cornish coast, to such an extent that in 1454 the Duke of Burgundy made an official complaint to the English government about the treatment meted out to Burgundian shipping in the area. In 1440 Bonville, with Sir Philip Courtenay—a close friend of Bonville's—commanded a small fleet of thirty galleys to patrol the Channel. They saw little action; the occasional encounters with the enemy did not necessarily go in their favour, as on one occasion rival Portuguese merchants captured two ships from Bonville's fleet.

=== Feud with the Earl of Devon ===
==== 1437–1440 ====
In 1437, Bonville was appointed Steward of the county of Cornwall for life, for which he received a salary of 40 marks yearly. This immediately made him an enemy of the young Earl of Devon, Thomas Courtenay; Courtenay's wealth was already reduced by his mother's dower, (Note: Courtenay had been born in 1414, had come of age in 1425, but his mother, Anne Talbot, survived until 1441. During this time she controlled, through both her dower and jointures, approximately two-thirds of the Courtenay inheritance. Furthermore, she had set up a council to manage the estate. This, says Archer, severely mismanaged it.) and so granting Bonville the stewardship was not only a blow to the regional hegemony the Courtenays traditionally enjoyed but reduced the earl's income further. The stewardship was a significant source of patronage to whoever held it in its own right. During the Earl's minority, Courtenay influence in Devon waned and shifted towards the county's upper gentry ("among whom Bonville was pre-eminent", argues Cherry). The historian Hannes Kleineke has argued that the minority created a power vacuum in the county which the regional gentry, such as Bonville, had helped fill. This enabled them to find new areas of profit in the absence of traditional Courtenay patronage. Bonville's (and other local gentry's) pre-eminence in Devon was found to be almost unassailable by the Earl, who wished to regain the regional authority that his ancestors had held. This friction between Bonville and Courtenay soon turned violent.

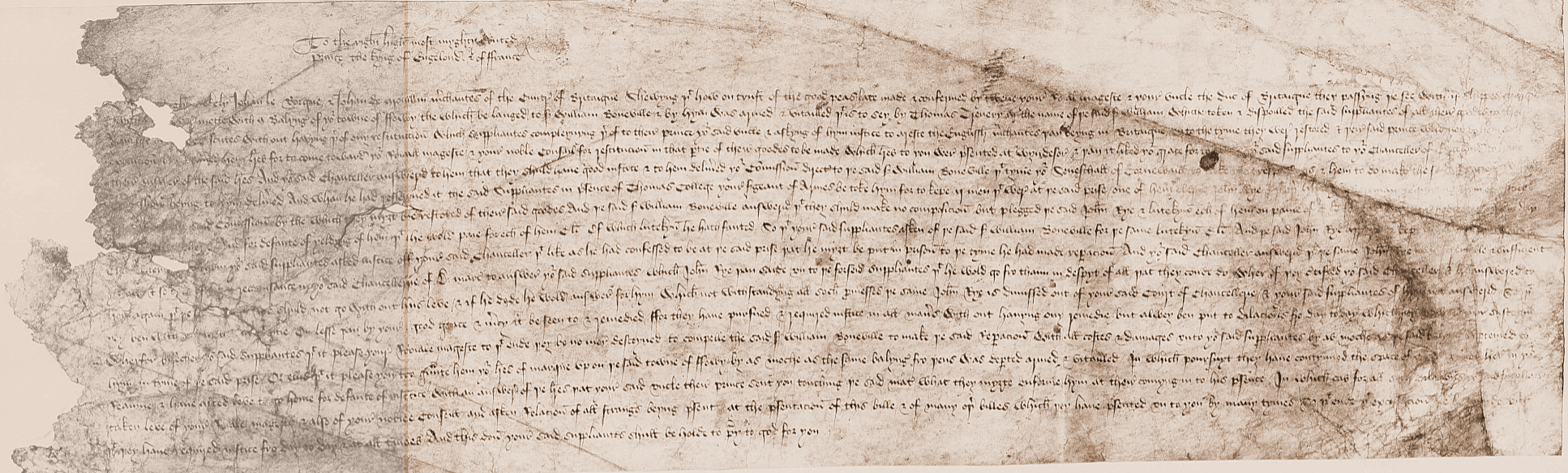

The grant of the stewardship has been described by Carpenter as "the immediate catalyst for the Courtenay–Bonville feud, which had been threatening for some time". It was one of many internecine and familial feuds within the English noble families in the second half of Henry VI's reign. (Note: Feuds between baronial and noble families had become particularly common in fifteenth-century England. Apart from that of Bonville's and Courtenay's in the southwest, another dispute that descended into armed feuding took place between the Percies and the Nevilles in Yorkshire; this was of such violence and breadth that it directly influenced national politics. Less impactful nationally yet still regionally destructive were the feuds between the Harrington and Stanley families in the northwest, John, Lord Talbot and James, Earl of Wiltshire on the Welsh marches, between William Tailboys and Ralph, Lord Cromwell in the Midlands, and, resulting in a battlefield confrontation at Nibley Green which saw Viscount Lisle killed in action, the feud over the Berkeley inheritance in Gloucestershire.) It was further exacerbated, in 1440, by what the Griffiths calls "a serious blunder" by the crown—a contemporary council minute described the grant as causing "grete trouble". Courtenay—in what Griffiths describes as "imprudent treatment" by the crown—was granted the office of steward of the Duchy of Cornwall. This, Cherry says, was "a post so similar to that held by Bonville as to be hardly distinguishable from it," (Note: The historian Christine Carpenter has described this "double grant" as the "most famous instance" of what she has termed the "deskilling" of governmental administrative departments in the early years of Henry VI's personal rule, which resulted in, as Bonville and Courtenay discovered, not only a "lack of control over grants, but outright confusion and contradiction".) and disrupted an already fragile balance of power in the region. Violence between Bonville and Courtenay broke out soon after and "divers and many men [were] hurte". In November 1442 both men were summoned before the King's Council to explain themselves. Bonville attended in person and was bound over. Courtenay, says Griffiths, "disdainfully made his excuses".

Bonville antagonised Courtenay by going out of his way to recruit men to his retinue who had traditionally been retained by the Earl. An arbitration took place; or, at least, a decision was imposed upon them, even if an "unworkable" one, according to the historian John Watts. Bonville was by now fifty years old and had not been abroad for nearly 20 years, but in 1443 the council—probably hoping another stint in France would "divert his ample energies from the West Country"—appointed him seneschal of Gascony. (Note: The Seneschal of Gascony, with four sub-seneschals, headed the military, judicial and administrative framework of the Duchy of Gascony on behalf of its lord.) He was not the government's only option for the post: his own retainer Sir Philip Chetwynd had been governing Guyenne since the previous November. (Note: The governor worked alongside Guyenne's seneschal and was responsible for assembling the ducal parlement, overseeing security and general provisioning for the region. It was his political knowledge and experience, says the medievalist Malcolm Vale, "that ultimately determined his importance".) The council intended that Courtenay should also help relieve Avranches, although in the event he did not do so. Accompanied by Sir John Popham—a "reliable and experienced" soldier—Bonville sailed in March the following year. He had indentured to provide 20 men-at-arms and 600 archers as an advance-guard to a larger expeditionary force. King Henry presented him with a personal gift of £100 towards his campaign expenses. Yet it is almost certain that their fleet did not leave Plymouth for many more months. Griffiths has suggested that by now, "the time had passed when a modest-sized army like Bonville's would do". Its size had been limited by the fact that the vast majority of the men raised by the Crown were despatched to Normandy, which was considered more important. At least one ship and men (possibly amounting to a third of his army) and materiel was lost en route. Bonville focussed on assaulting the harbour, fleet and town of La Rochelle itself (French chroniclers referred to Bonville as a corsair). His campaign achieved little, and Bonville himself was seriously injured in a skirmish.

==== 1440–1453 ====
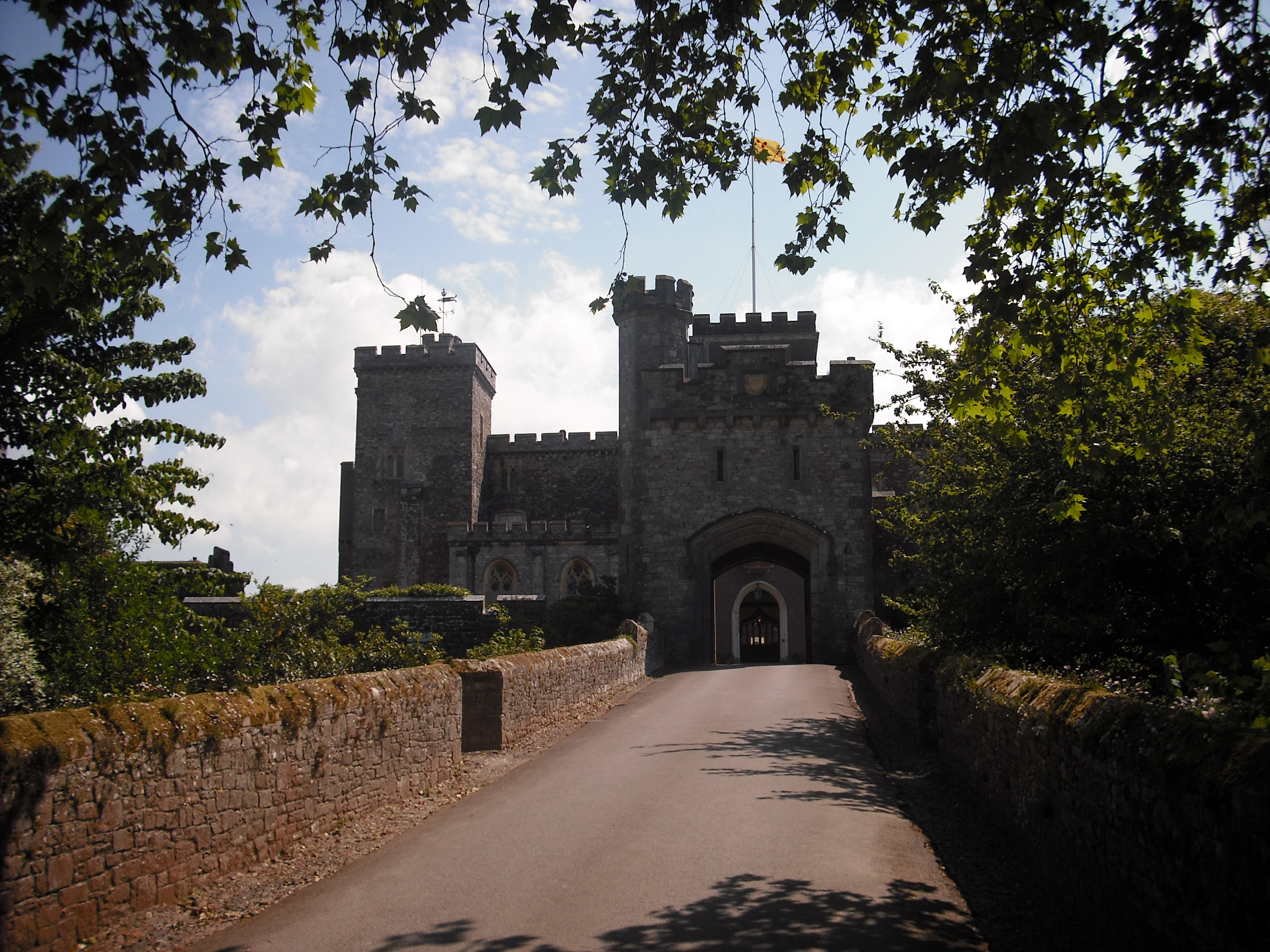
The western entrance of Powderham Castle, as shown in 2010; Bonville attempted to lift Courtenay's siege here on multiple occasions.

Bonville was absent from England for slightly over two years and returned in April 1445. During his absence, Courtenay had become increasingly powerful in Devon. The King, though, was revealing himself to be a weak-willed monarch, unwilling—or unable—to impose the King's peace in the south-west, or, for that matter, elsewhere. Henry was under the influence of his favourite, William de la Pole, Duke of Suffolk, and Suffolk's government could not afford to alienate the Earl of Devon. Conversely, Suffolk was still an attractive ally for Bonville against the Earl, as Bonville's Lincolnshire associate and later son-in-law, Tailboys, was closely linked with Suffolk. (Note: William Tailboys has been described by the historian Roger Virgoe as "exceptionally violent and unscrupulous even for that age". Tailboys was involved in a long-running and increasingly violent feud with Lord Cromwell throughout the 1440s and 1450s, and, Virgoe suggests, probably found Bonville and the latter's connections at court of particular assistance against Cromwell.) Suffolk's policy was one of trying to keep both Bonville and Courtenay happy. Bonville's newly-acquired political proximity to Suffolk brought benefits. In 1444 Bonville joined the duke's retinue to France, where Bonville played a central role in the betrothal ceremony between King Henry and his bride-to-be, Margaret of Anjou. By a writ of 10 March the following year Bonville was elevated to the peerage. This was both in recognition of his successes in France—it had been a "turbulent period" in Gascony—but also a reflection of the esteem Suffolk held him in. As Baron Bonville of Chewton; he was summoned to every parliament until the end of his life as Willelmo Bonville domino Bonville et de Chuton. In 1446 Bonville suppressed a revolt in Somerset, in which Wells Cathedral was attacked by "insurgents against the peace of the Church and the King".

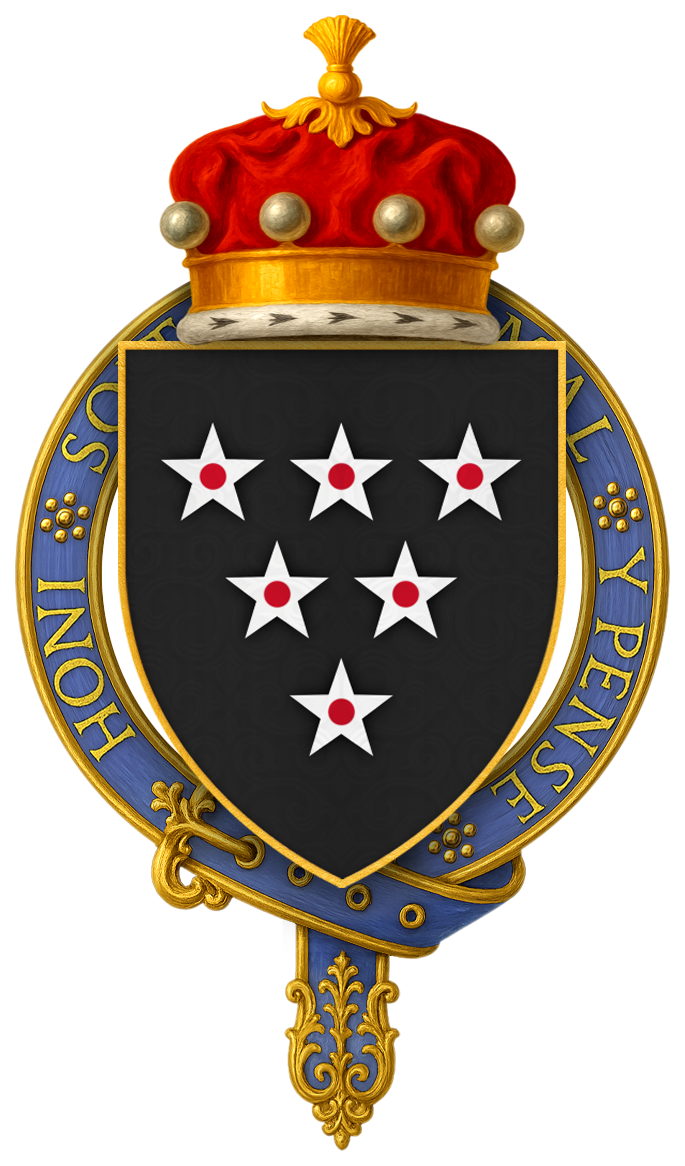
Arms of Bonville: Sable, six mullets argent pierced gules

Bonville's association with Suffolk was not to last. In early 1450, the duke was impeached in the House of Lords and exiled as a result. Suffolk was subsequently murdered en route to the continent. Roskell notes that, although Bonville is known to have attended this parliament, it remains unknown what position he took—if he took any—on Suffolk's impeachment. One of the most powerful critics of Suffolk's government had been Richard, Duke of York, and the Earl of Devon soon allied himself with the duke as a means of furthering his position in the West Country. Courtenay saw his newly-reinforced position as sufficiently secure to allow him to reignite the feud with Bonville, who in Taunton was recruiting men to his banner at sixpence a day. To this end he launched a series of raids onto Bonville properties, which culminated in Courtenay's besieging of Bonville's Taunton Castle with a force of over 5,000 men—a crisis that the contemporary chronicler William Worcester described as "maxima perturbatio". (Note: Translated to English, Worcester described it as "the greatest disturbance".) Fighting alongside Courtenay was Edward Brooke, Lord Cobham, son of the Thomas Brooke whom Bonville had feuded with over a decade previously. Courtenay's alliance with York was not as strong as the Earl believed, and when York arrived in Devon to restore order, he promptly cast both Bonville and Courtenay, with many of their retainers, into prison for a month. Bonville was forced to put Taunton Castle into the duke's custody. This particular phase of the feud was suspended by the holding of a loveday (dies amoris) between Bonville and Courtenay at Colcombe in 1451. This was an important enough political event for it to warrant the attendance of Richard, Lord Rivers and his wife Jacquetta, Lady Rivers as the King's representatives.

The Earl of Devon's continuing alliance with York brought Courtenay further problems in 1452. By then, York felt excluded from the government as the King had a new favourite, Edmund, Duke of Somerset. In February that year York rebelled and marched on London with a large force. He faced the King's army at Blackheath, south-east of London. Courtenay stood alongside him. Somerset and much of the rest of the nobility faced York and Courtenay down: they surrendered without a fight. Bonville had raised a body of men to join the King's army, and subsequently profited from Courtenay's disfavour with the King. The historian A. J. Pollard suggests that Bonville was given "a free hand" in the region as a result of York's and Devon's eclipse and according to Cherry, this allowed Bonville to become the predominant figure in county politics. He was commissioned to oversee the arrest and prosecution of the Earl of Devon's men after Blackheath, and the following year King Henry demonstrated the esteem Bonville stood in when, during Henry's royal progress through the south-west, he stayed at Bonville's caput of Shute. Bonville received further offices and responsibilities. He was confirmed as steward of the Duchy of Cornwall, reappointed seneschal of Gascony and also made lieutenant of Aquitaine. Bonville has been described by historians connected to The Gascon Rolls Project as being "an excellent choice for lieutenant" (Note: The office of lieutenant of Aquitaine went back to at least 1278, and since the Duke of Aquitaine was also King of England, the lieutenant ruled directly on the King's behalf. It was a royal appointment, usually to a close relative of the King, although it was a sporadic one, being mostly filled during periods of war or civil disturbance. It was not a particularly profitable office, notes the economist Michael Postan, and indeed was "as likely to be a source of loss as gain" for the appointee, and the King was regularly forced to provide financial inducements to those he wished to take up the post.) and received the constableship of Exeter Castle. He also received grants of lands and estates in South Teign, the castle, borough and manor of Lydford, the conservancy of the River Exe, and forestry rights in Dartmoor, making him, wrote the historian Bertram Wolffe, "exalted in the west country". Bonville never took up his seneschalcy as what remained of England's territorial possessions in France were lost at the Battle of Castillon in July 1453. King Henry—now in Exeter—appointed Bonville to a large commission of oyer and terminer to investigate sympathy for York's rebellion in the area, and the King made him a gift of £50.

=== Henry's illness and Yorkist government ===
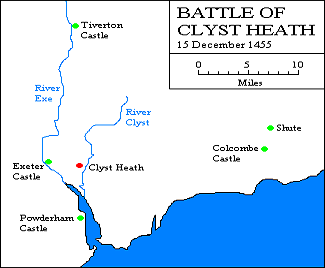
Map of the location of the Clyst engagement, 1455

In August 1453, King Henry suffered a period of illness and mental collapse during which he was unable to respond to people or stimulus. He was, therefore, unable to carry out his royal duties. The Lancastrian regime, already weakened by factionalism, was paralysed, and the national political scene became increasingly tense. Bonville attended a council at Westminster in early 1454. This, a Paston correspondent reported, was only after he had "maken all the puissance they can and may to come hider [to Westminster] with theym". It was rumoured that Bonville was planning to join up with other lords—those of Beaumont, Poynings, Clifford and Egremont—and march on London itself, although in the event this did not occur. (Note: In other words, it was rumoured that Bonville ordered the gathering of the largest force of men (a puissaunce) that he could, and that having done so, he brought them (hider) to Westminster with him; from a letter of 19 January 1454 from John Studley to John Paston.) Everyone, including Bonville, was preparing for war on a national scale.

The House of Lords eventually appointed the Duke of York as protector of the realm during the King's incapacitation, and York appointed Salisbury chancellor. Although Courtenay was nominally York's ally, the Earl did not see any major benefits from this relationship. (York's other allies, argues John Watts, the Nevilles, received York's assistance in their on-going feud with the Percies in Yorkshire.) Bonville experienced no lessening of his position during the protectorate; indeed, he had committed flagrant acts of piracy against foreign shipping off the south-west coast, which went unpunished. The most prominent victims of Bonville's actions were the Duke of Burgundy's merchants; Burgundy was England's ally on the continent, a position which Bonville's ships endangered.

=== Battle of St Albans and Bonville's ascendancy ===
In early 1455 King Henry made a sudden recovery. York and Salisbury were removed from their positions in government and retired to their estates. National politics, already heavily partisan, was tense. The King summoned a great council to be held in Leicester in May. Several chroniclers of the day suggest that Somerset was poisoning the King's mind against York. He and the Nevilles may have feared imminent arrest. In any case, they reacted swiftly and with violence. They ambushed the King's small army at the First Battle of St Albans on the 22nd in a pre-emptive strike. Courtenay fought for the King and was wounded. Bonville may also have been sympathetic to the royal cause, as one of his pursuivants was used as a messenger by the King's councillors. He did not join the royal army, however. Michael Hicks has suggested that both Bonville and Courtenay were more interested in prosecuting their own feud than the national one. King Henry had been captured by the Yorkists after the battle: once again they controlled the government. Although clearly unwilling to turn against his King at this point, Bonville did attend the Yorkist parliament of September 1455, where he voted in favour of the Duke of York's appointment as protector. Bonville was appointed to the parliamentary committee set up to improve naval defence. He also used his local influence to ensure that the vacant Bishopric of Exeter was reserved for the Earl of Salisbury's youngest son, George Neville, and in November Bonville received a general pardon.

In the south-west, Bonville and his ally, James Butler, Earl of Wiltshire (also at this time very close to the court) were recruiting heavily. They caused a proclamation "to be cryed at Taunton in Somersetshire that every man that is likely and wole go with theym and serve theym shalle have vjd. [sixpence] every day as long as he abideth with theym". Bonville's dominance in the south-west forced the Earl of Devon to respond drastically, and at the end of April 1454 Devon brought an armed force of hundreds of men into Exeter in a planned ambush. The plan failed, but Bonville was prevented from carrying out his duty as a collector of a royal loan. Although in the following June both Bonville and Courtenay were instructed by the King to keep the peace—and each bound over for £4,000 to do so—they appear to have continued their war of attrition. Such was the "anarchic state of affairs" in Devon following St Albans that the Michaelmas term judicial sessions that were due to be held in Exeter had to be cancelled. Courtenay went on to terrorise the county with his army and ransacked Bonville's houses. This culminated on 23 October 1455 with what has been described as the "most notorious private crime of the century", when Courtenay's son—also Thomas—and a small force of men attacked and brutally murdered one of Bonville's close councillors, the prominent local lawyer Nicholas Radford. Carpenter comments: "there were other enormities, principally directed against Lord Bonville. Nothing was done".

Devon had committed such offences, so Bonville said, falsely, cowardly and traitourously, in breach of his faith as a knight, his prowess and honour, his allegiance, the common good, and the standards "that should pertain to thy estate" as an earl. So damaging were these charges to the Earl's good name that they could not be ignored.

— Michael Hicks, historian

=== Bonville's challenge and Courtenay's ascendancy ===
Radford's murder marked the beginning of a brief campaign—a "range war"—between the two sides, even more violent than had gone before; which, says Griffiths, turned the region "periodically into a private jousting-field". Edmund Lacey, the Bishop of Exeter, complained that his tenants "dared not occupy the land". Bonville retaliated against Courtenay by looting the Earl's Colcombe manor; says the historian John Gillingham, "on both sides houses were pllaged, cattle driven off, and plenty of plunder taken". Determined to "bring Devon [Courtenay] out into the open on as equal terms as possible", says the historian Michael Hicks, and believing himself to have the "backing of God, the law, and the commonweal", on 22 November 1455 Bonville challenged Courtenay to a duel, albeit for both men to be accompanied by their retainers. He may also have been attempting to draw the Earl out of the city of Exeter, which Courtenay had been occupying for over a fortnight, or to distract him from his siege of Powderham Castle, which Bonville had already twice attempted unsuccessfully to lift. Courtenay had no choice but to take up Bonville's challenge, which openly informed the Earl that "all due salutacions of friendlihode [were now] laide aparte". (Note: The following day, 23 November 1455, Courtenay replied in much the same spirit, informing Bonville that, for Courtenay, "all frendly greting stonde for nougt". The Earl then informs Bonville that he would refute Bonville's slurs "upon thy fals body prove at time and place by me appoynted". Martin Cherry has noted how their antagonistic greetings "neatly parodied" the usual form of greetings that contemporary letters began with.) On 15 December the two sides met in battle near Clyst St Mary, to the east of Exeter. "Moche people wer sleyn": Although the engagement appears to have been somewhat inconclusive, if anyone lost, it was Bonville, who managed to escape alive, although, suggests Hicks, dishonoured, as he had been the challenger. Two days later, Courtenay attacked Bonville's Shute residence, pillaging it thoroughly and carrying away much booty. Courtenay continued his campaign against Bonville for two months.

Neither party had sufficient military or political weight to crush their opponent, and, "nasty as they were, there was little danger of the fights spreading geographically". Outside the region, the national political situation had become increasingly fraught with tension, and the Bonville–Courtenay feud soon became just one battlefield in the broader one of the civil war. The Earl was subsequently imprisoned, although only for a short period, and died in 1458 with neither the feud resolved or Bonville beaten. Bonville was made a Knight of the Garter the same year.

== Wars of the Roses ==
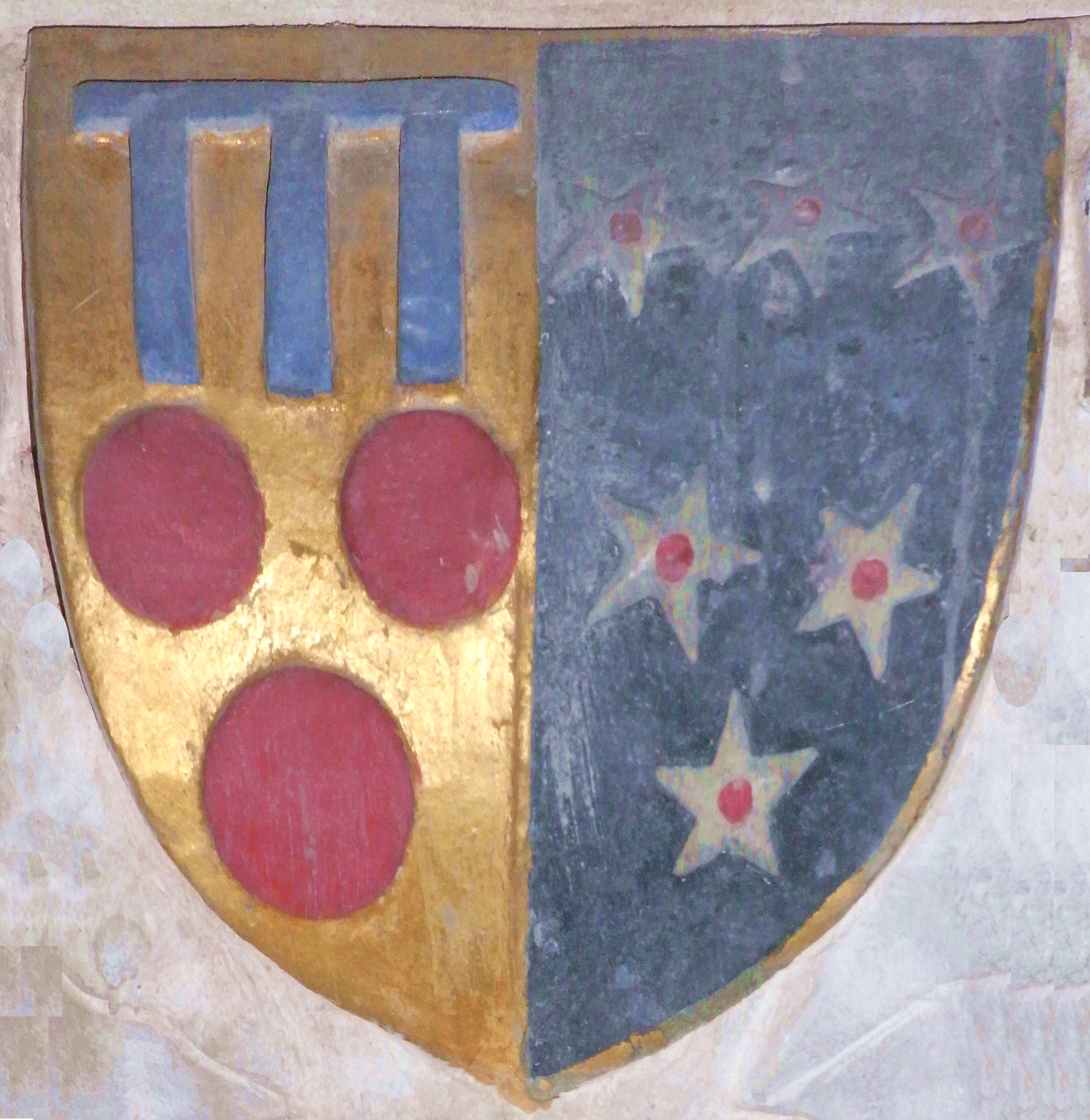
Heraldic escutcheon on easternmost of north aisle piers in St Clement's Church, Powderham, showing the arms of Courtenay of Powderham impaling Bonville. These are the arms of Sir William Courtenay (d. 1485), husband of Margaret, daughter of William, Lord Bonville.

Courtenay, by his actions at St Albans, had earned the support of Henry's powerful Queen, Margaret, who was by now implacably opposed to the Yorkist party. His son Thomas, who inherited the earldom, married the Queen's cousin, Marie de Maine, (Note: Further illustrating the favour Courtenay was in with the Queen, suggests Griffiths, was that the wedding gowns for his son's marriage to Marie were paid for out of the King's own Great Wardrobe.) and in 1458 Bonville's grandson married Katherine Neville, daughter of the powerful northern magnate Richard Neville, Earl of Salisbury. The modern historians Roskell and Woodger in the History of Parliament suggest that throughout this period Bonville managed to conceal any sympathy for the Duke of York and remained "outwardly loyal to Henry VI". The historian Charles Ross has described Bonville during this period as "a veteran servant of the House of Lancaster, who had been promoted to his peerage by King Henry VI [and who] clung to the court he had always served". He swore to uphold the rights of young Edward, Prince of Wales against the Yorkists at the 1459 Parliament, and in early 1460 he was commissioned to raise an army in the south-west.

Within a few months, say Roskell and Woodger, Bonville "revealed his true colours" and fought for the Yorkists at the Battle of Northampton in June 1460. Here the victorious Yorkists again captured King Henry, and Bonville was put in charge of his safe-keeping. Bonville attended the parliament of November that year which passed the Act of Accord. This act effectively granted York the throne on Henry's death, and thus disinherited the Prince of Wales. Margaret and her nobles withdrew to the north, where they gathered an army and began to pillage the Yorkist lords' estates there. York and the Earl of Salisbury, with their smaller army, marched north the following month; Bonville remained in London. Bonville's son William marched with York, and died with him at the Battle of Wakefield, where the Yorkist army went down to a crushing defeat by the Lancastrian army on 30 December 1460.

=== Second Battle of St Albans ===
The Lancastrians proceeded to march south; Salisbury's son, Richard, Earl of Warwick, had been left in charge of the King in London. Bonville, who had been in the south-west raising an army, returned to London. Warwick, Bonville and other lords left the capital on 12 February 1461 with an army to intercept the Queen's force before the latter could reach the city gates. They encountered each other at the Second Battle of St Albans on 17 February 1461. Bonville—along with Sir Thomas Kyriell—was placed in charge of the King, whom the Yorkists had brought with them as the "nominal" head of their army (said the early-20th-century historian C. L. Scofield). They were responsible for Henry's protection during the battle. This, suggests Ross, may indicate that even at this late stage Bonville was still primarily motivated by a wish to protect the King he had served since youth. Warwick's force was rapidly isolated by the swift-moving Lancastrian army, and Warwick fled, leaving the field—and King—to the victorious Lancastrians. Bonville and Kyriell were also captured. The following day they were summoned before the Queen and Prince Edward, and it is possible that both had been promised a pardon by the King. However, in the presence of the Earl of Devon—and probably at his instigation—the two were tried for treason. The result was a foregone conclusion. Prince Edward "was jugge ys own selfe", and sentenced them to death. Both men were beheaded the same day; (Note: Recent scholarship has cast an element of doubt on this story, as it would dovetail neatly into the Yorkist narrative as propaganda. As has been said, "both Bonville and Kyriel were experienced military commanders, and it is unlikely that their role in the battle would have been limited to looking after King Henry". The story presented by the (Yorkist) chroniclers was that the Prince of Wales, encouraged by Queen Margaret, personally passed Bonville's and Kyriel's death sentences. Supposedly she asked him, "Fair son, what manner of death shall these knights, whom you see here, die?", to which the Prince replied, "Let them have their heads taken off". To the Prince, Kyriel is said to have retorted, "May God destroy those who have taught thee this manner of speech!" This stage of the civil wars saw frequent post-battlefield beheadings by the victor. Two months previously, captured Yorkists (including the Earl of Salisbury) had been executed after Wakefield; earlier in February, Lancastrians were killed after the Battle of Mortimer's Cross, including Owen Tudor; Bonville and Kyriel two weeks later at St Albans; and two months later, in April 1461, the Earl of Devon ("who was sick in York and could not get away", commented John Leland). Over 40 other knights and nobles were beheaded by the victorious Yorkists after the Battle of Towton.) the executions were met with what the historian David Grummitt has described as the "general condemnation" of contemporaries. Bonville's death extinguished the male line of the Bonville family of Chute, (Note: Other cadet branches of the family remained; for example at Dillington, where Lord Bonville's cousin John Bonville resided and made a family. This John was the grandson of William, Lord Bonville's paternal uncle, Thomas.) and, says Pollard, settled the Bonville-Courtenay "blood feud" for good.

== Aftermath ==
Bonville's household was almost immediately dissolved, although some of his staff remained with his widow. He had left no will when he died. His estates and wealth were effectively divided three ways: between his widow; his brother; and his illegitimate son. As both Bonville's legitimate sons had predeceased him, his estates and titles passed to his one-year-old great-granddaughter Cecily. She later married Thomas Grey, Marquess of Dorset. A portion of the patrimony had been entailed in the male line by Bonville's grandfather, and these lands descended to his younger brother, Thomas, and then Thomas' son. Much of Bonville's retinue entered the employment of Humphrey Stafford and Bonville's old ally Sir Philip Courtenay of Powderham. Bonville's and Courtenay's deaths prolonged the power vacuum in Devon, and, says the historian Malcolm Mercer, "a dominant source of authority in the area remained elusive thereafter".

Although executed for treason, Bonville escaped attainder due to the victory a few weeks later of Edward of York—son of Richard of York—at the Battle of Towton on 29 March 1461. The Lancastrian army was destroyed: Queen Margaret escaped to Scotland, Henry went on the run in the north, and Edward claimed the throne as King Edward IV. Following the battle, the Earl of Devon was captured and beheaded at York. (Note: Apart from the Bonville and Courtenay families, K. B. McFarlane has identified only three other noble families whose ultimate extinction in the main line was directly attributable to the Wars of the Roses: those of Welles, Hungerford and Talbot.) Edward IV's cousin and chancellor, Archbishop of York George Neville, later called Bonville a "strenuous cavalier", and the 1461 attainder of ex-King Henry referred to Bonville's "prowesse of knyghthode". In recognition of the contribution that Bonville and his family had made to the House of York, Edward granted Bonville's widow Elizabeth a large dower. She died 18 October 1471 having never remarried.
