= John Grey (knight) =

English nobleman and soldier (c. 1387–1439)

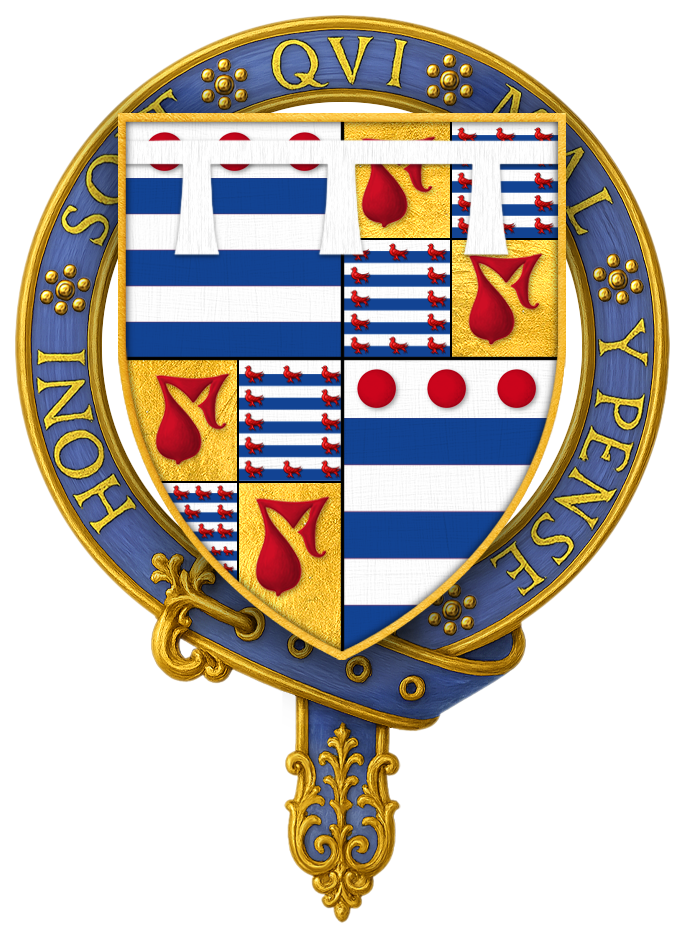
- Arms of Sir John Grey, KG
- Born: c. 1387
- Died: 27 August 1439 (aged 51–52)
- Spouse: Constance Holland (d. 1437)
- Children: 3, including Edmund
- Father: Reginald Grey
- Relatives: Reynold Grey (grandfather); Margaret Grey (sister)

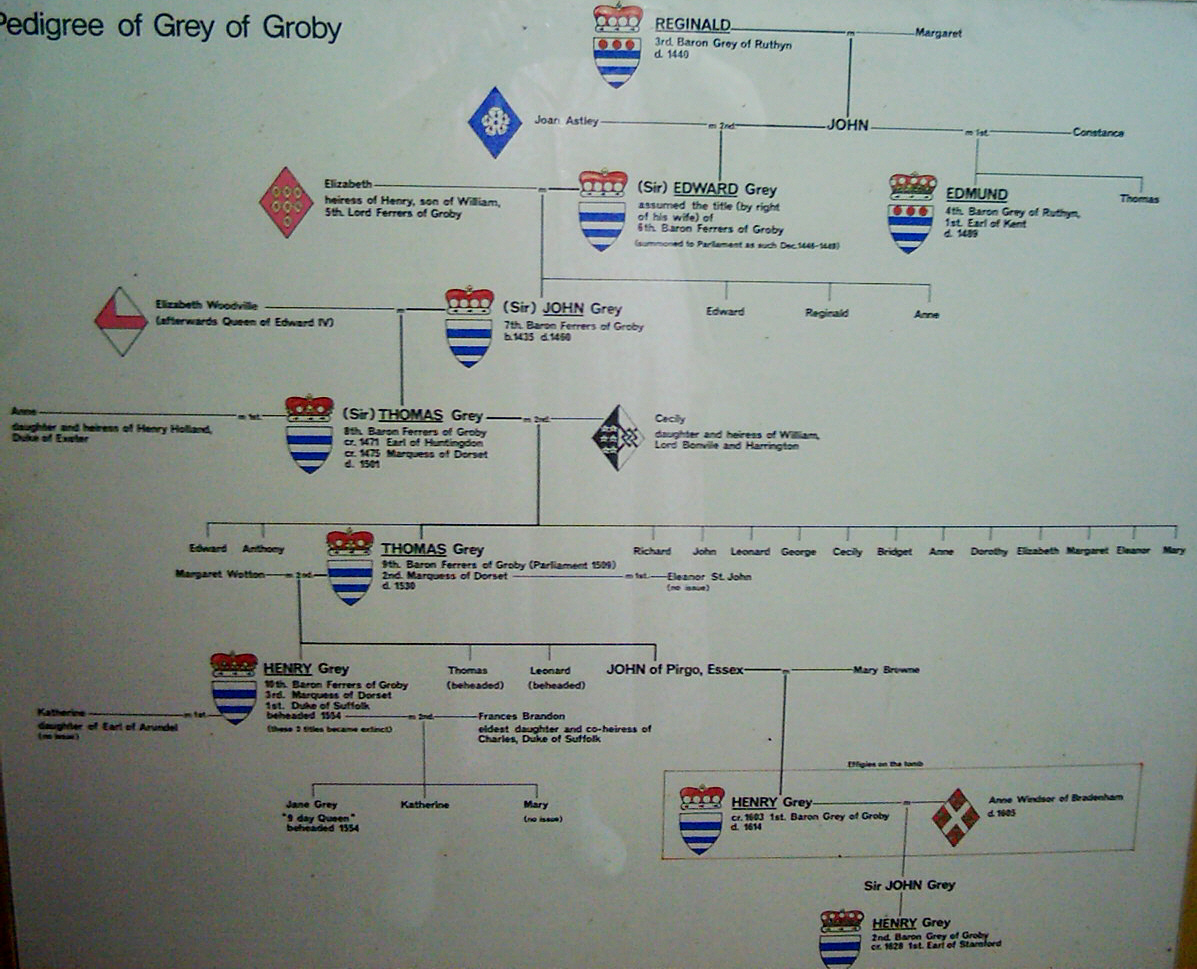
Reginald Grey Pedigree of Grey of Groby displayed within Bradgate Hall ruins.

Sir John Grey (c. 1387 – 27 August 1439), English nobleman and soldier, of Ruthin, Denbighshire, Wales, Badmondisfield (in Wickhambrook), Suffolk, Great Gaddesden, Hertfordshire, etc., second but eldest surviving son and heir apparent of Sir Reginald Grey, 3rd Baron Grey de Ruthyn by his 1st wife, Margaret Roos. He was also Captain of Gournay. He was Lord Lieutenant of Ireland in 1427-28, acting mainly through the Bishop of Meath as his Deputy.

== Biography ==
He travelled with the king to France in 1415 and 1417. He fought at the Battle of Agincourt and was invested as the 151st Knight of the Garter on 5 May 1436.

He married (first) before Trinity term 1410 (as her second husband) Constance Holland (c.1387–14 November 1437), the daughter of John Holland, 1st Duke of Exeter (half brother of King Richard II), by his wife, Elizabeth of Lancaster.

By her mother, Constance was a niece of King Henry IV. Constance married (first) before 1 June 1402 (by papal dispensation dated 18 Sept. 1391, they being related in the fourth degree of kindred) Sir Thomas Mowbray, 4th Earl of Norfolk, Earl of Nottingham, Earl Marshal, Lord Mowbray, Segrave, and Gower. They had no issue. Sir Thomas Mowbray was executed on 8 June 1405 due to his revolt against her uncle, King Henry IV.

Sir John Grey and Constance Holland had three children:

- Sir Edmund Grey, 1st Earl of Kent (1416–1490)
- Sir Thomas Grey, Lord Richemount Grey, of Simpson, Buckinghamshire, Richemount, Bedfordshire, Merton, Westmorland, Langton, Yorkshire, etc., Justice of the Peace for Buckinghamshire, 1453–8, Justice of the Peace for Bedfordshire, 1455. He was created Baron of Richemount Grey by charter dated 25 June 1450, with remainder to his heirs male. He fought on the Lancastrian side at the Battle of Towton on 29 March 1461. He was subsequently attainted Nov. 1461 by the first Parliament of King Edward IV, whereby his honours and lands were forfeited, and he was executed soon afterwards.
- Constance Grey, who married Sir Richard Herbert.

Constance, Countess Marshal, died 12 (or 14) Nov. 1437, and was buried in a chapel at St. Katherine by the Tower, London by her brother, John Holland, Duke of Exeter.

== Death ==
Sir John Grey died on 27 August 1439, in his father's lifetime.
