= Hugh Hastings II =

14th century English noble

Hugh Hastings II (died 1369), Lord of Elsing, Brisley and Grimston, was an English soldier and noble. He fought in the Hundred Years' War.

Hugh was the eldest son of Hugh Hastings and Margery Foliot. After his death, it was claimed that Hugh had first unfurled his banner in battle against the Saracens. He served in John of Gaunt's retinue during his expeditions into Normandy, Brittany, France and Gascony during the Hundred Years War. Captured while in Castile, Hugh was later exchanged in a prisoner exchange. While fighting in France in 1369, he was killed. Both Hugh and his wife are buried at Black Friars, Doncaster.

== Marriage and issue ==
Hugh married Margery, daughter of Adam de Everingham and Joan D'Eilville, they are known to have had the following known issue:

- Hugh Hastings (died 1386), married Anne le Despenser, had issue.
- Margaret Hastings, married firstly John Wingfield, and secondly John Russell.
- Joan Hastings, married Thomas Morley, had issue.
- Alice Hastings, married John Rochford, had issue.
- Elizabeth Hastings, married firstly Thomas Caterton and secondly William Elmham.
