= Maunch =

Heraldic figure

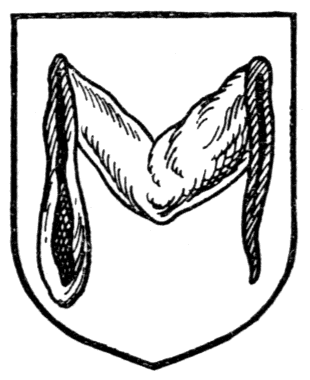
Illustration of a maunch from Arthur Fox-Davies' Complete Guide to Heraldry

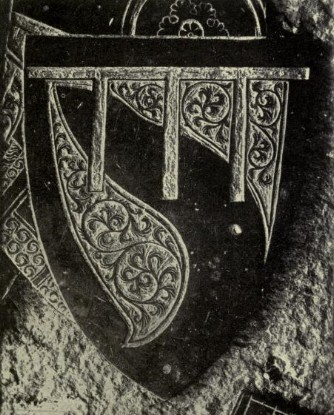
Arms of Hugh Hastings: Or, a maunch gules a label of three points argent for difference

A maunch (from the French manche "sleeve") is a heraldic charge representing a detachable lady's sleeve with a wide pendulous cuff, as worn by fashionable women in the 13th and 14th centuries. Maunches are found most frequently in English heraldry, occurring to a lesser extent in the heraldry of France, Scotland, and other countries.

In the Middle Ages ladies would commonly give their sleeves as favours for knights to wear in tournaments. Thus, heraldic maunches came to symbolise that the armiger was popular with the ladies, or that he loved his wife. Alternatively maunches can occur as canting arms, such as in the arms of the Mohun and Mansel families. French heraldry refers to maunches as manches mal-taillées (meaning "badly cut sleeves") to distinguish them from ordinary sleeves.

== In literature ==
In Sir Thomas Malory's Le Morte d'Arthur, Sir Lancelot fights in a tournament anonymously as an unknown knight using a white shield with a red sleeve on it. He also affixes Lady Elaine le Blanc's sleeve to his helmet to further disguise himself as he has never worn a lady's token of affection in a tournament.
