= Hugh Hastings I =

English administrator and soldier

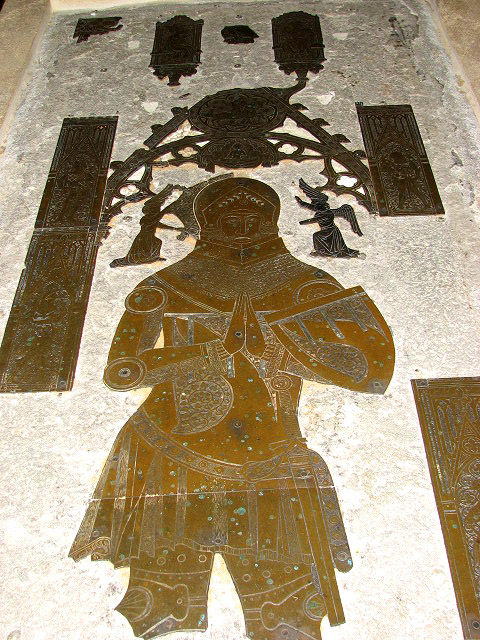
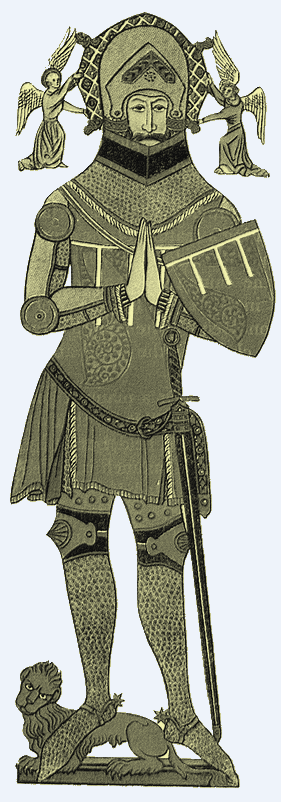
Part of a monumental brass of Hastings in St Mary's Church, Elsing (left) and a drawing of the same (right)

Sir Hugh Hastings I (c.1310–1347) was an English administrator and soldier. He fought for Edward III in the first phases of the Second War of Scottish Independence and the Hundred Years' War. His largely surviving monumental brass in Elsing Church in Norfolk is "one of the most celebrated of all English brasses".

== Family and property ==
Arms of Hugh Hasting, blazoned: Or, a maunch gules, a label of three argent

Hugh was the second son of John Hastings, 1st Baron Hastings, by his second wife, Isabel, a daughter of Hugh Despenser, Earl of Winchester. By 18 May 1330, he was married to Margery Foliot, who was born around 1312 and was a ward in his mother's house from 1325 until their marriage. With Margery, he had two sons, John (c.1328–1393) and Hugh (died 1369), and a daughter, Maud. Margery outlived him, dying on 8 August 1349.

Margery was a granddaughter of Jordan Foliot and co-heir with her younger brother Richard of the manors of Elsing and Weasenham in Norfolk and other property in Nottinghamshire and Yorkshire. It was through Margery that Hugh acquired these holdings and from his mother that he inherited the manor of Monewdon in Suffolk and a moiety of the manor of Sutton Scotney in Hampshire upon her death in December 1334. He received livery for his inheritance on 28 March 1335.

Hugh held several manors from Henry of Grosmont, Earl of Derby. Shortly before 1342, Hugh acquired a life interest in the manor of Oswardbek in Nottinghamshire from Laurence Hastings, Earl of Pembroke, his nephew. These two earls were the principal lords under which Hugh served in the wars with France.

== Administrator ==
Although he was never a high sheriff or knight of the shire, Hugh's capabilities were appreciated by Edward III. He served regularly on commissions of oyer and terminer and was appointed justice of the peace for the West Riding of Yorkshire on 8 November 1338.

Hugh was summoned to attend the Great Council that met at Westminster Abbey on 29 April 1342. He was one of only 106 laymen summoned to that council. In the mid-1340s, he served as steward of the household of Edward's queen, Philippa of Hainaut. Neither of these appointments could have been made without the approval of Edward III.

In early May 1347, Hugh was appointed seneschal of Gascony and assigned a retinue of fifty men-at-arms and eighty archers for the task. He died before he could take up his new post.

== Soldier ==
Hugh can be traced soldiering in Scotland every year from 1335 to 1338.

In July 1338, Hugh sailed from Orwell with the king's army to Antwerp in the Duchy of Brabant. He took part in the naval campaign in the English Channel and was present at the battle of Sluys on 24 June 1340. In 1342–43, he served in the comitiva (retinue) of the Earl of Pembroke during the Breton campaign. He was serving under the Earl of Pembroke again during the Aquitanian campaign of 1345, under the ultimate leadership of the Earl of Derby. According to the French chronicler Jean Froissart, Hugh was present for Derby's victory in the battle of Auberoche on 21 October 1345. It is known, however, that the Earl of Pembroke missed the battle and so it is possible that Froissart is mistaken in placing Hugh there. Hugh appears to have returned to England before the Siege of Aiguillon, which lasted from April to August 1346 and resulted in England retaining control of the castle.

The highest military post in which Hugh served was that of king's captain and lieutenant in Flanders, to which he was appointed on 20 June 1346. In his capacity as Edward's Flemish lieutenant he mounted an attack on France's northern border as a diversion during the king's invasion of Normandy in July. Hugh recruited an army from the Flemish towns and with his own retinue of 250, mostly archers, laid siege to Béthune. His Flemish army proved undisciplined and the siege was abandoned in failure before the end of August.

Hugh missed the great English victory at the battle of Crécy on 26 August 1346, but with the lifting of the Béthune siege he joined the siege of Calais, begun on 4 September, with his men-at-arms and some archers. He was still in the siege camp when he was appointed seneschal of Gascony in May 1347.

== Death and burial ==
Having been appointed for service in Gascony, Hugh left the siege of Calais and returned to England. Perhaps he was already ill from conditions in the camp. He drew up his last will and testament at Old Ford in Middlesex on 22 July 1347. A week later he was dead. He was entombed in the chancel of St Mary's Church, which he had built in Elsing. His tomb was opened by archaeologists in September 1978. Hugh was shown to have been about 5 feet 10 inches tall at his death. He was buried wearing either a wig or a hat made of cow hair. There was evidence of injuries sustained in warfare: damaged incisors from a blow to the jaw and osteoarthritis in the shoulder and elbow.

== Monumental brass ==
The surviving nearly life-size monumental brass effigy on Hugh's ledger stone is "one of the most celebrated of all English brasses". Hugh is portrayed as a knight dressed in full armour, flanked by eight much smaller "mourner" or "weeper" figures (two now missing) each displaying his own coat of arms on tunic and / or shield, and representing men under whom Hugh had served, but who were not necessarily present at his funeral. At his right hand (viewer's left), top to bottom, are: King Edward III; Thomas de Beauchamp, 11th Earl of Warwick, later KG; Hugh le Despenser, 1st Baron le Despenser (missing); Roger Grey, 1st Baron Grey of Ruthin; At his left hand (viewer's right), top to bottom, are: Henry of Grosmont, 4th Earl of Lancaster (later KG and 1st Duke of Lancaster); Laurence Hastings, 1st Earl of Pembroke (missing); Ralph Stafford, 2nd Baron Stafford (later KG and Earl of Stafford); Amauri de St Amand, 2nd Baron Amand.

It is believed to make references to the future Order of the Garter which was established by the king in 1348, shortly after Hugh's death. St George, The Order's patron saint, appears at the top of the brass killing the Dragon, and a pennon displaying the saint appears on the lances of three of the mourners, namely the Earl of Lancaster, the Earl of Warwick and Lord Stafford, who together with the king formed four of the Order's 26 Founder Knights. "One may speculate, therefore, that the figures with St. George's pennons may have been members of a proto-order or association, which also included Hastings, and eventually became the Order of the Garter."
