= Reynold Grey, 3rd Baron Grey of Ruthin =

Welsh lord (c. 1362–1440)

- Arms of Grey de Ruthyn: Barry of six argent and azure in chief three torteaux
- Born: c. 1362
- Died: 30 September 1440 (aged 77–78)
- Spouse(s): Margaret de Ros Joan de Astley (m. 1415)
- Children: 11+, including John and Margaret
- Father: Reynold Grey
- Relatives: Ida de Grey (sister); Roger Grey (grandfather); Robert Poynings (grandson); Edmund Grey (grandson); John Grey (grandson)

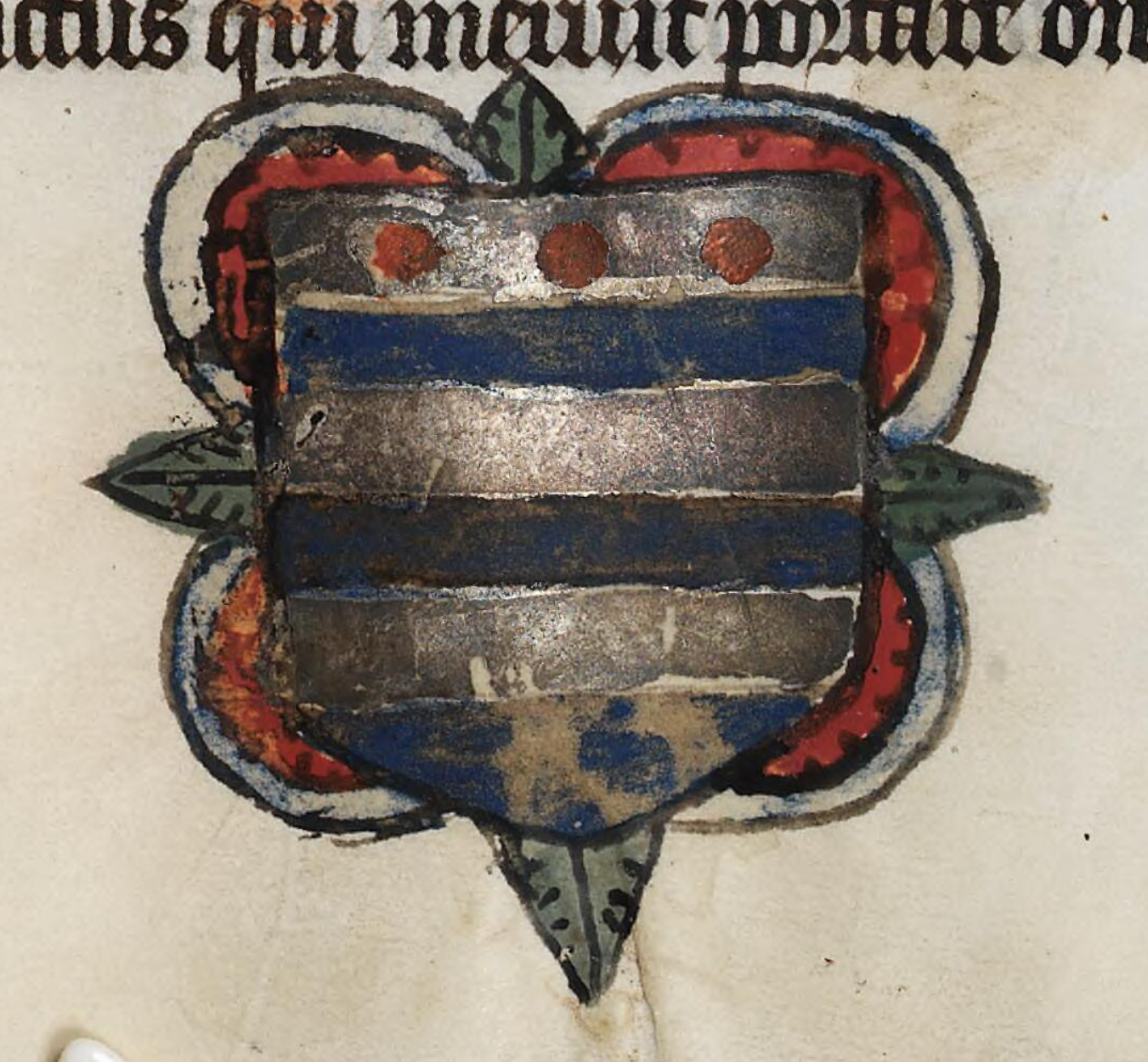
Arms of Grey on a barbed quatrefoil, illumination in the De Grey Hours, probably written for the De Grey family of Ruthyn circa 1390. National Library of Wales

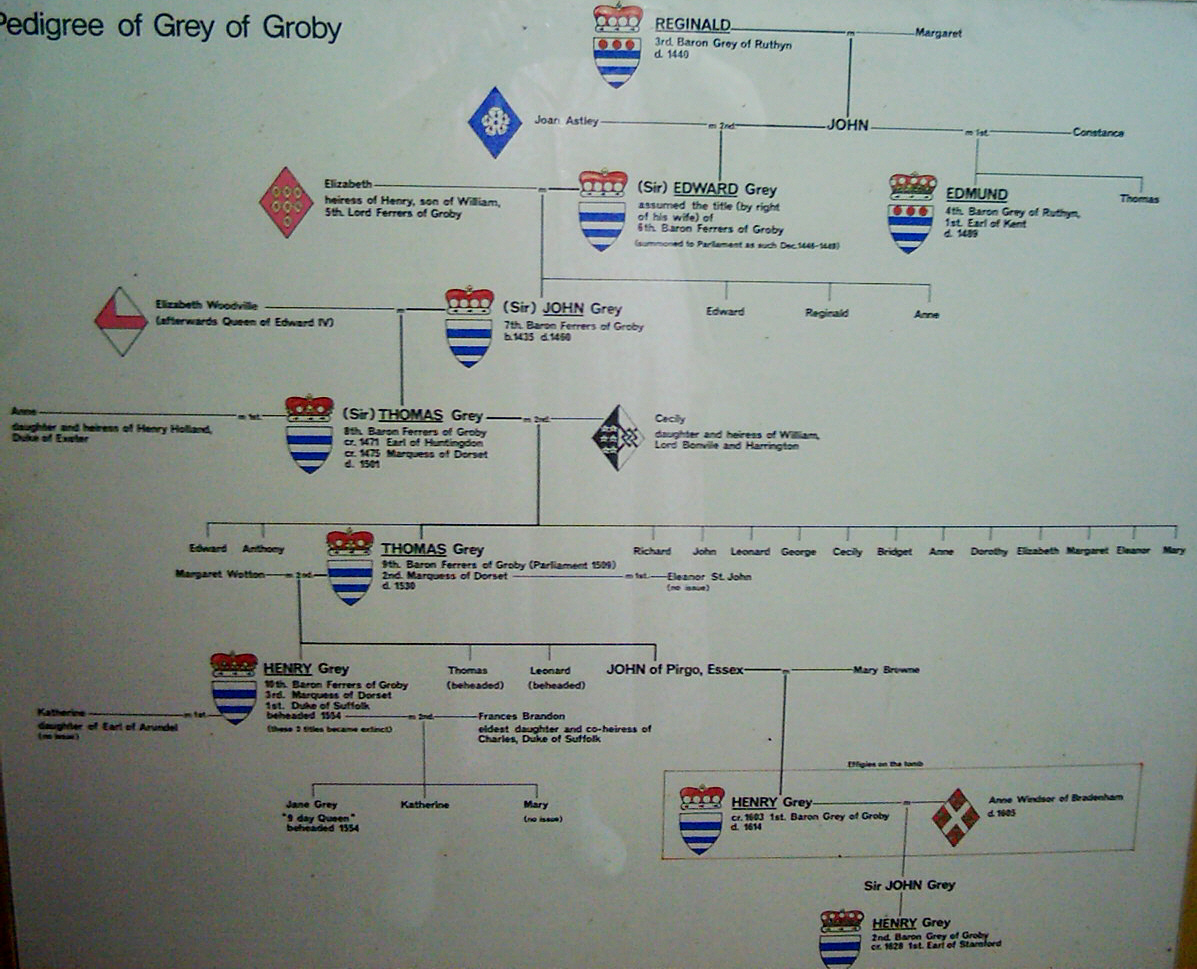
Reginald Grey Pedigree of Grey of Groby displayed within Bradgate Hall ruins.

Reynold Grey, 3rd Baron Grey of Ruthyn (c. 1362 – 30 September 1440), a powerful Welsh marcher lord, succeeded to the title on his father's death in July 1388.

== Lineage ==
Reginald Grey was the eldest son of Reynold Grey, 2nd Baron Grey of Ruthin and Eleanor Le Strange of Blackmere. His paternal grandparents were Roger Grey, 1st Baron Grey of Ruthin and Elizabeth de Hastings. His maternal grandparents were John Le Strange, 2nd Baron Strange of Blackmere and Ankaret le Boteler.

== Marriages and issue ==
Grey married firstly, after 25 November 1378, Margaret de Ros, daughter of Thomas de Ros, 4th Baron de Ros of Helmsley by Beatrice de Stafford, daughter of Ralph de Stafford, 1st Earl of Stafford, by whom he had two sons and several daughters, including:

- Eleanor Grey, who married before 22 October 1397 (as his 1st wife) Robert Poynings, Knt., 4th Baron Poynings, by whom she had three sons, Sir Richard Poynings (d. 10 June 1429), Sir Robert Poynings and Edward Poynings (d. 1484).
- Thomas Grey (living 1387).
- Sir John Grey, K.G., the 2nd but eldest surviving son, (c. 1387 – 27 August 1439), who predeceased his father. He married Constance Holland, the daughter of Elizabeth Plantagenet and John Holland, 1st Duke of Exeter by whom he had issue, including Edmund Grey, 1st Earl of Kent (also 4th Baron Grey de Ruthyn).
- Catherine Grey (b. 1392), married George de Lucy, Baron de Lucy.
- Margaret Grey (b. c. 1397 - d. after April 1426 and before October 1427), who married William Bonville, 1st Baron Bonville. These were the great-grandparents of wealthy heiress Cecily Bonville, 7th Baroness Harington who married Thomas Grey, 1st Marquess of Dorset, a descendant of Reginald Grey by his second marriage.

Grey married secondly on 7 February 1415, Joan de Astley, daughter of Sir William de Astley, 4th Baron Astley and Joan de Willoughby. Joan de Astley died in 1448. By her, he had three sons and three daughters, including:

- Sir Edward Grey (c. 1415/1416 - 18 December 1457), who married Elizabeth Ferrers, 6th Baroness Ferrers of Groby, and had five children including Sir John Grey of Groby, the first husband of Elizabeth Woodville.
- Robert Grey (born 1419), who married Eleanor Lowe.
- John Grey of Kempston, Bedfordshire.
- Constance Grey, who married Sir John Cressy.
- Elizabeth Grey, who married Sir William Calthorpe, by whom she had issue.
- Eleanor (or Alianore) Grey, who married William Lucy, esquire, of Charlecote, Warwickshire.
- Alice Grey, married Sir John Knivett, a descendant of Sir John Knyvett

== Rebellion of Owain Glyndŵr ==
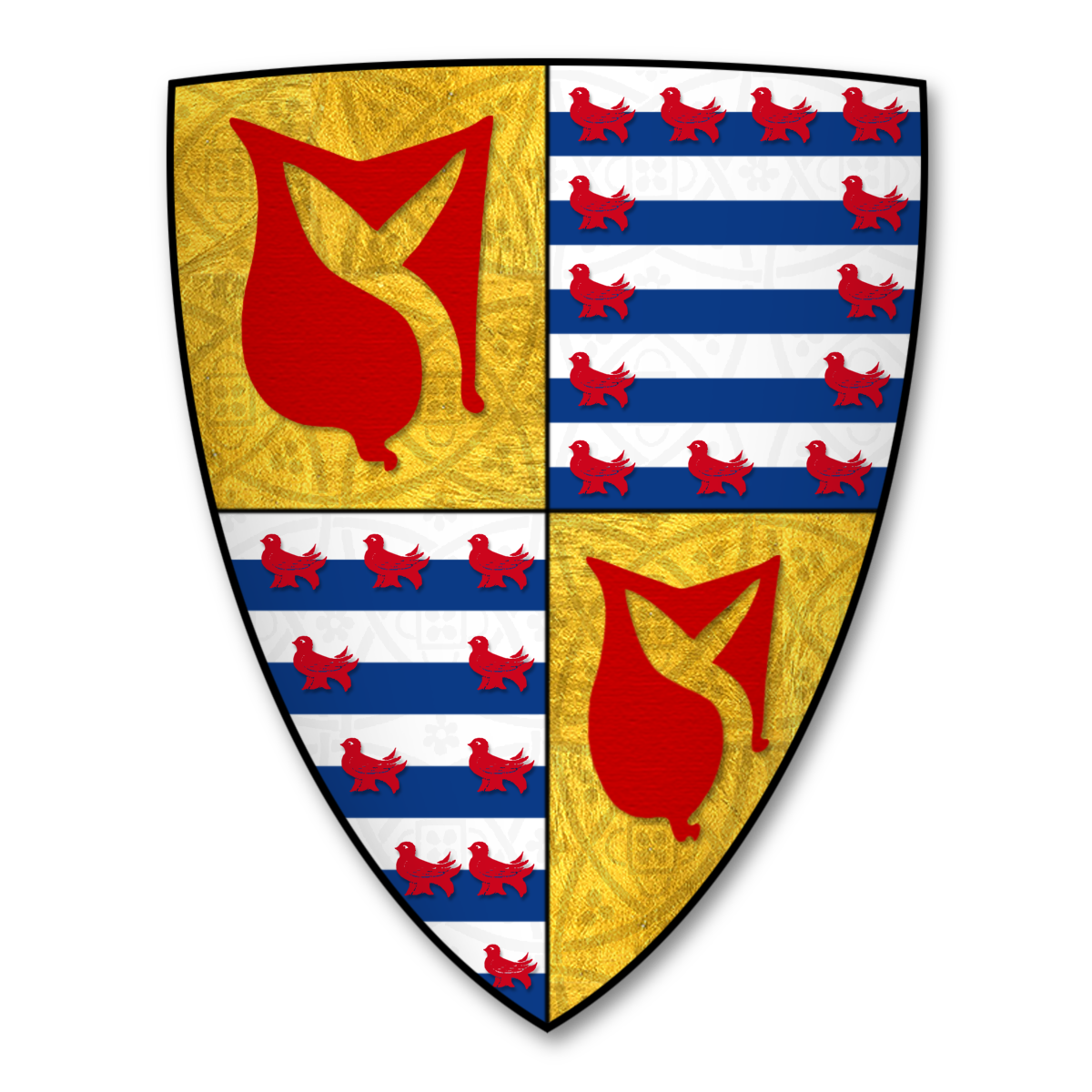
Arms of Hastings, Earls of Pembroke: Hastings quartering Valence

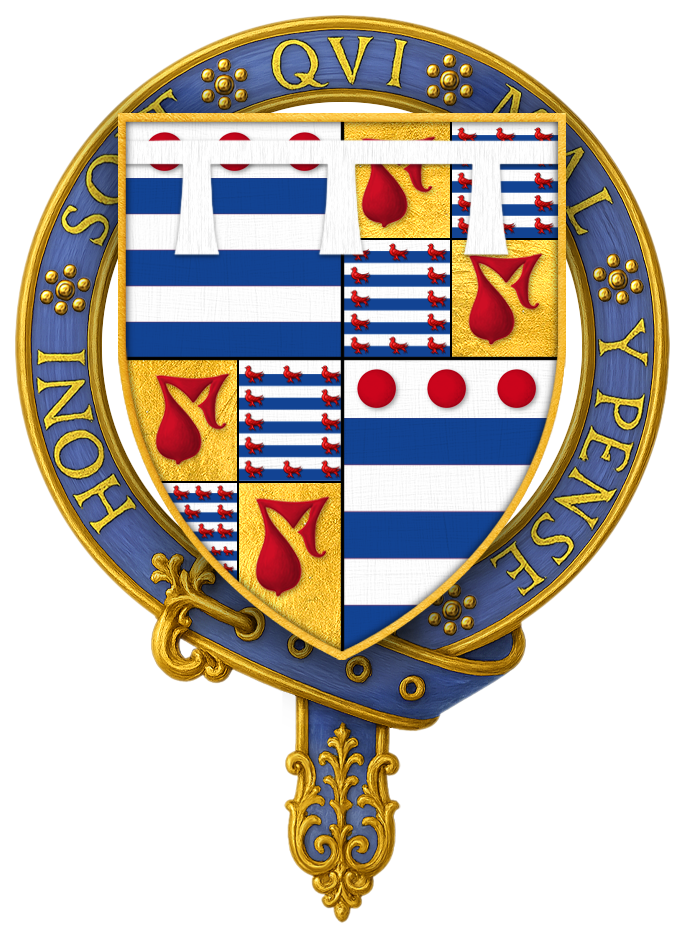
Arms of Sir John de Grey

In 1410, after a long legal dispute, the younger Reginald won the right to bear the arms of the Hastings family, but rather than the undifferenced arms which were born by the Hastings of Sutton he won the right to the higher status quartered arms born by his deceased cousin the Earl of Pembroke: Hastings quartering Valence. Since he had gained the right to bear these arms from his claim through his paternal grandmother, he displayed Quarterly 1 & 4: Grey de Ruthyn; 2 & 3: Hastings quartering Valence. (Sir John de Grey displayed the new family arms with a label argent for difference from his father's arms). More important from a financial perspective, he gained title to certain properties of the estate.

De Grey enjoyed the favour both of Richard II and Henry IV, and his chief military exploits were against the Welsh, during the rebellion of Owain Glyndŵr. Reynold de Grey was responsible for issuing and enforcing royal demands in the Northern March, such as calling the local nobility and gentry and their men to Royal and military service. He was already in a long-running legal dispute with Glyndŵr, claiming a tranche of Glyndŵr's land as his own.

Under King Richard II the case had been found in favour of Glyndŵr, but on the usurpation of King Henry IV of England, Lord Grey seized the land. Early in September 1400, Henry IV left Newcastle and travelled south to Northampton, which he reached by the 19th. There news reached the King of the quarrel that had broken out between Grey and Glyndŵr. Grey was a member of the King's Council.

Glyndŵr responded in law early in 1400 but his case was not granted a hearing, instead it was asked of Glyndŵr that he grant Lord Grey further concessions. De Grey also delayed summoning Glyndŵr's quota or levy of men for service in Scotland until the last moment, making it impossible for Glyndŵr to respond as requested or even send an explanation for his absence and the lack of his levy. Such an act as refusal or failure to respond to an order of the King was deemed a treasonous act. Glyndŵr's estates were deemed forfeit until he could prove his loyalty or receive due punishment. On 16 September Owain and brothers had taken up arms and burned Grey's property, for three days the Welsh band ravaged the countryside of Flintshire and Denbighshire. On 24 September, Glyndŵr’s forces were encircled at Welshpool and defeated.

De Grey now invited Glyndŵr to a reconciliation meeting, but arrived with a large force, attempting to surround Glyndŵr and making his intentions clear. Glyndŵr escaped with his life and went into hiding, confirming himself a traitor in English eyes. King Henry confiscated the estates of Glyndŵr's supporters, and granted them to John Beaufort, his half-brother. The rebellion spread after initial successes for the Welsh and by 1402 it was gathering momentum. Lord Grey was captured by Glyndŵr's forces in an ambush near Ruthin in January.

A ransom of 10,000 marks was asked for him and Lord Grey was asked to swear an oath never to bear arms against Glyndŵr again. King Henry IV sent eleven knights to treat with Glyndŵr and then complied with the ransom, ordering the selling of a manor in Kent to raise the monies in mid-1402. On 22 June, Glyndŵr captured another important hostage, Edmund Mortimer.

Lord Grey then would have been expected to repay the amount over time as best he could and any outstanding debt would be borne by his family. In August, Glyndŵr went south into the Marches. The King, however, held Grey in better view than Mortimer, whom he considered a troublemaker. While Grey and Earl of Northumberland were loyal; it was clear that Hotspur intended to join Glyndŵr’s rebellion.

Hotspur had refused to surrender a Scottish prisoner, the earl of Douglas, to the King, and had demanded that Edmund Mortimer be purchased his freedom. Henry was furious that his power should be challenged in this way. The King wrote to Grey and other leading nobles on 23 November 1409, demanding that all officers who were entreating with Glyndŵr should cease forthwith. The rebellion had failed after the re-capture of Harlech, and the release of Mortimer's family. The Grey family did in fact sell the Ruthyn Lordship to King Henry VII in 1508 when their fortunes and favour had declined.

== Hundred Years War ==
Grey was a member of the Council which governed England during the absence of Henry V in France in 1415; he later fought against the French in the Hundred Years War in 1420 and 1421.

== Bibliography ==
- Richardson, Douglas (2011). Everingham, Kimball G. (ed.). Magna Carta Ancestry: A Study in Colonial and Medieval Families. Vol. II (2nd ed.). Salt Lake City, Utah: Douglas Richardson. ISBN 978-1449966386.
- Richardson, Douglas (2011). Everingham, Kimball G. (ed.). Magna Carta Ancestry: A Study in Colonial and Medieval Families. Vol. III (2nd ed.). Salt Lake City, Utah: Douglas Richardson. ISBN 978-1449966393.

Peerage of England
Preceded by Reynold Grey	Baron Grey of Ruthyn; 1388–1440	Succeeded by Edmund Grey
