= Elsing =

Village in Norfolk, England

Coordinates: 52.708°N 1.035°E

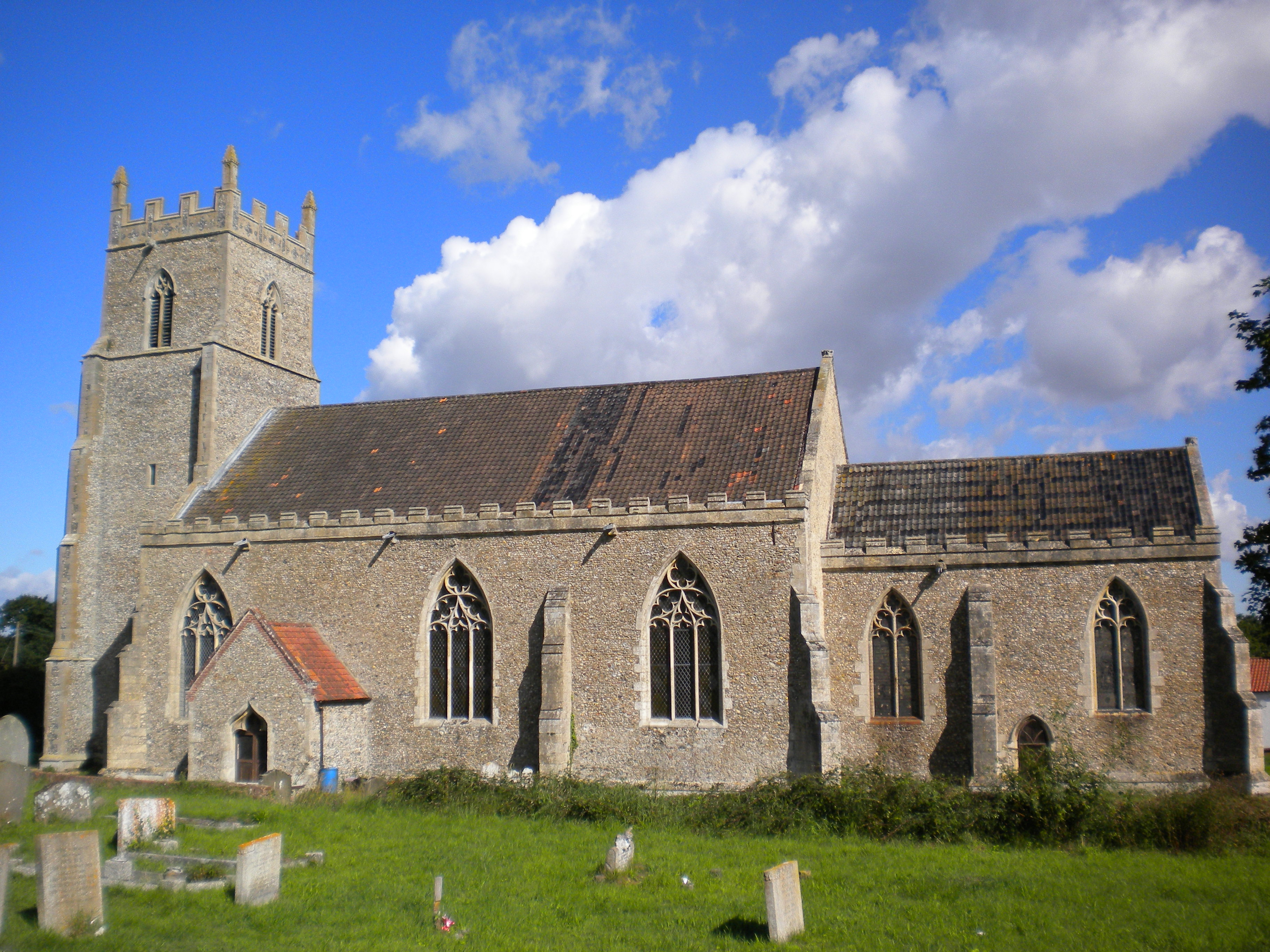
- St Mary's Church

- Location within Norfolk
- Area: 2.45 sq mi (6.3 km^{2})
- Population: 263 (2021 census)
  - Density: 107/sq mi (41/km^{2})
- OS grid reference: TG051166
- District: Breckland
- Shire county: Norfolk
- Region: East
- Country: England
- Sovereign state: United Kingdom
- Post town: DEREHAM
- Postcode district: NR20
- Dialling code: 01362
- Police: Norfolk
- Fire: Norfolk
- Ambulance: East of England
- UK Parliament: Mid Norfolk

Elsing is a village and civil parish in the English county of Norfolk.

Elsing is located 4.2 miles (6.8 km) north-east of Dereham and 12 miles (19 km) north-west of Norwich, close to the course of the River Wensum.

== History ==
Elsing's name is of Anglo-Saxon origin and derives from the Old English for the settlement of Elesa's people.

In the Domesday Book of 1086, Elsing is listed as a settlement of 20 households in the hundred of Eynesford. In 1086, the village was part of the East Anglian estates of William de Warenne.

Elsing Hall was built in the late fifteenth century as a fortified manor house for the Hastings family of Gressenhall. The agricultural land surrounding the hall has yielded many medieval artefacts including a pilgrim's badge, a French jeton and parts of a crossbow, with a good example of a sixteenth-century priest hole inside. The hall was heavily restored in the mid-Nineteenth Century by Thomas Jeckyll.

Some sources suggest that medieval Elsing had a large population with its own marketplace and guildhall.

Elsing Mill was first built in 1809 and operated as a paper mill until 1818. The mill subsequently reopened in 1854 as a grain mill and remained open until 1970. Today, the mill building is a private residence.

== Geography ==
According to the 2021 census, Elsing has a population of 263 people which shows an increase from the 244 people recorded in the 2011 census.

The River Wensum runs through the parish.

== St. Mary's Church ==
Elsing's parish church is dedicated to Saint Mary and was built in the Fourteenth Century, largely as a mausoleum for Sir Hugh Hastings. St. Mary's is located within the village on Church Road and has been Grade I listed since 1960.

St. Mary's holds a good collection of Medieval stained-glass, including depictions of Sir Hugh Hastings alongside Saint George and King Edward III.

== Governance ==
Elsing is part of the electoral ward of Upper Wensum for local elections and is part of the district of Breckland.

The village's national constituency is Mid Norfolk which has been represented by the Conservative's George Freeman MP since 2010.

== War memorial ==
Elsing War Memorial is a stone column topped with a Celtic cross with the names of the fallen inscribed on a small plinth below, located inside St. Mary's Churchyard. The memorial was unveiled in August 1921 by a party of local dignitaries led by Bertram Pollock, Bishop of Norwich. The memorial lists the following names for the First World War:

Rank	Name	Unit	Date of death	Burial/Commemoration
RSM	Harry J. Mason	Norfolk Regiment	3 Jul. 1918	St. Mary's Churchyard
Sgt.	Donald W. Kerrison	7th Bn., Royal Irish Regiment	16 Jul. 1918	Tincourt British Cemetery
Cpl.	Charles Candy	50th Coy., Machine Gun Corps	4 May 1917	Sainte-Catherine Cemetery
LCpl.	John W. Kendall	8th Bn., Border Regiment	7 Sep. 1917	Lijssenthoek Cemetery
LCpl.	Harry Lawrence	8th Bn., Norfolk Regiment	23 Oct. 1917	Dozinghem Cemetery
Pte.	Walter G. Isbell	10th Bn., Essex Regiment	12 Aug. 1917	Menin Gate
Pte.	S. William Rix	2nd Bn., Royal Fusiliers	19 Aug. 1918	Ploegsteert Memorial
Pte.	John C. Dack	1st Bn., Norfolk Regiment	27 Jul. 1916	Thiepval Memorial
Pte.	Benjamin R. Wire	1st Bn., Norfolk Regt.	27 Jul. 1916	Thiepval Memorial
Pte.	Matthew E. Bowes	7th Bn., Norfolk Regt.	23 Feb. 1918	St. Mary's Churchyard
Pte.	George Rix	7th Bn., Norfolk Regt.	3 Jul. 1916	Thiepval Memorial
Pte.	E. William Dack	7th Bn., Northamptonshire Regiment	31 Jul. 1917	The Huts Cemetery

The following names were added after the Second World War:

Rank	Name	Unit	Date of death	Burial/Commemoration
Sgt.	Keith S. Bushell	No. 206 Squadron RAF	4 Jul. 1940	Runnymede Memorial
Pte.	Gordon R. Isbell	East Surrey Regiment	20 Jul. 1944	St. Giles' Churchyard
