= John Arundell (died 1590) =

English politician

Sir John Arundell
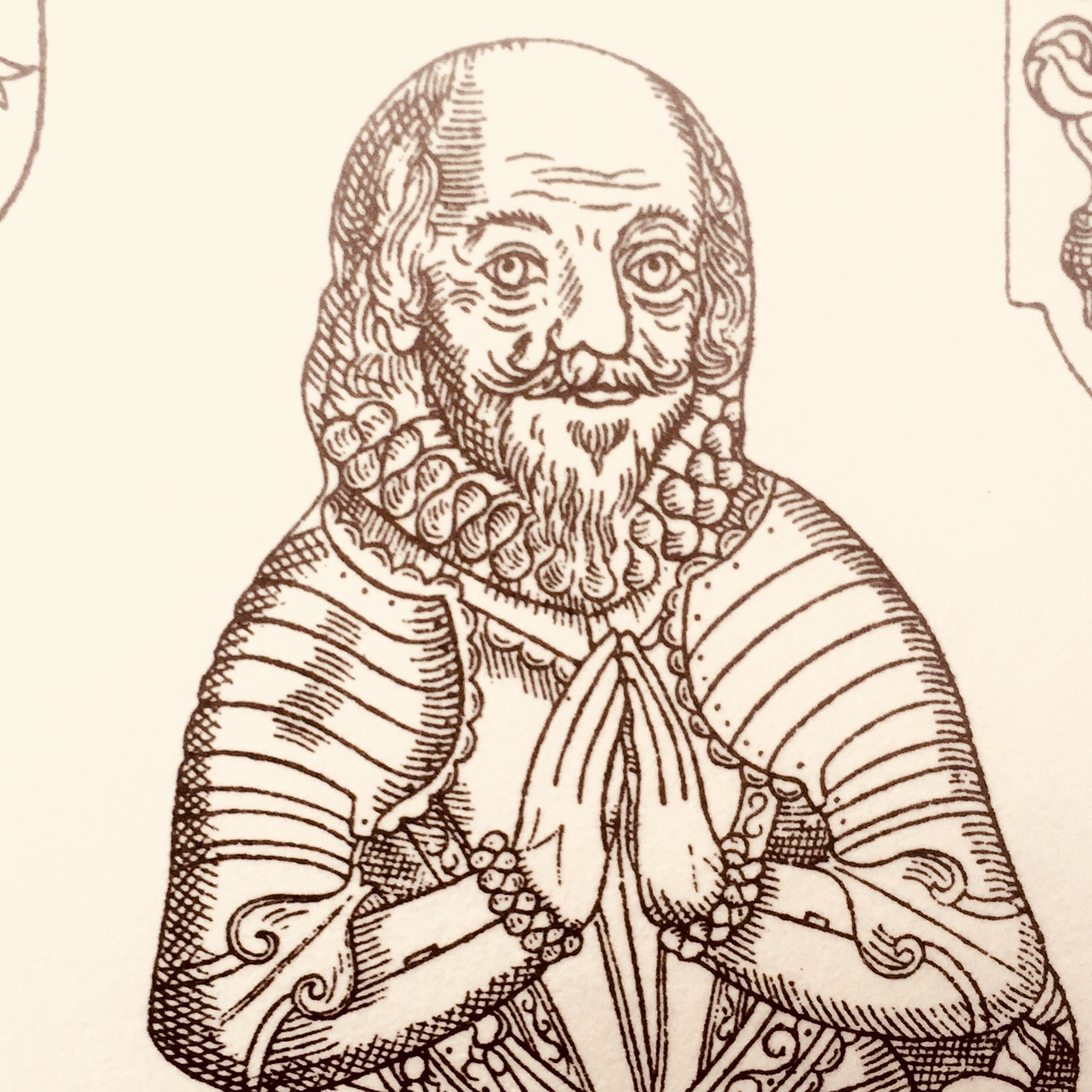
- John Arundell of Lanherne

Member of the English Parliament for Helston (UK Parliament constituency)

Personal details
- Died: 1590
- Resting place: St Columb Major

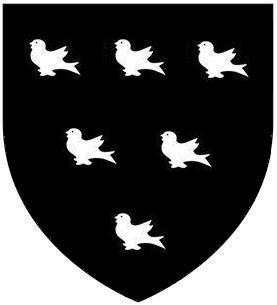
Arms of Arundell of Lanherne, Cornwall: Sable, six martlets argent.

John Arundell (by 1527 – 17 November 1590), of Lanherne, St. Mawgan-in-Pyder, Cornwall, was an English politician. He was a noted recusant, and a close associate of the Catholic martyr St. Cuthbert Mayne.

== Biography ==
He was the eldest son of John Arundell (died 1557) and Elizabeth Dannett, daughter of Sir Gerald Dannett of Dannett's Hall, Leicestershire. The Arundells were a wealthy and influential family with close connections to the Tudor dynasty. The head of the senior (Lanherne) branch of the family was often described as "the most important man in the county". The elder John's younger brother Thomas was also a political figure of some eminence, who fell out of Royal favour and was executed for treason in 1552. John was imprisoned but never brought to trial. Under the Catholic Queen Mary I, the surviving Arundells, who were staunch Catholics, regained much of their influence in Cornwall.

John Arundell married, in 1557, Lady Ann Stanley, widow of Charles Stourton, 8th Baron Stourton, and daughter of Edward Stanley, 3rd Earl of Derby and Lady Dorothy Howard. Their children included:

- Dorothy Arundell c.1559 who was a Benedictine nun and author
- Gertrude Arundell, nun
- John Arundell (1564–1633), who married Ann Jerningham, daughter of Henry Jerningham
- George Arundell, who married Dorothy Viell
- Thomas Arundell

Arundell was a Member of the Parliament of England for Helston in 1545, Shaftesbury in 1547, Preston in 1555 and Cornwall in 1558.

== Recusant ==
Like his father, and many other members of the Arundell family, he was an open Roman Catholic. He refused to subscribe to the Act of Uniformity 1559 and rarely attended Anglican services (despite the legal obligation to do so at least once a week, on pain of a fine). He was a close associate of the martyr Cuthbert Mayne, and paid for the education of another Catholic martyr, John Cornelius, later to be the family chaplain for eleven years. Because of his standing in the community, he was left in peace until 1577, when his association with Cuthbert Mayne became public knowledge. He was arrested and spent some years in the Tower of London, and was later imprisoned in Ely Palace, from which he was released shortly before his death: he was also heavily fined by the Star Chamber.

His widow continued to engage in openly recusant activities. John Cornelius served as her private chaplain, even though harbouring a Catholic priest had been made a capital offence by the Jesuits, etc. Act 1584. Cornelius was tried and executed under the same Act in 1594, but Lady Arundell was apparently left in peace. She died in 1602. Their daughters, Dorothy and Gertrude, funded the creation of English Benedictine convent in Brussels.

== Ancestry ==
Ancestors of John Arundell (died 1590)

16. John Arundell
8. Thomas Arundell
17. Katherine Chideock
4. John Arundell (1474–1545)
18. John Dinham (1406–1458)
9. Katherine Dynham
19. Joan Arches
2. John Arundell (of Lanherne, died 1557)
20. John Grey of Groby
10. Thomas Grey, 1st Marquess of Dorset
21. Elizabeth Woodville
5. Eleanor Grey
22. William Bonville, 6th Baron Harington
11. Cecily Bonville, Baroness Harington and Bonville
23. Lady Katherine Neville
1. John Arundell (of Lanherne, died 1590)
24.
12. John Danet
25.
6. Gerald Danet
26. Gerard De La Hay
13. Joan De La Hay
27.
3. Elizabeth Danet
28.
14. Henry Belknap
29.
7. Mary Belknap
30. Thomas Knollys
15. Margaret Knollys
31. Isabel More
