= Elizabeth Fitzgerald =

Elizabeth Fitzgerald may refer to:

- Elizabeth FitzGerald, Countess of Lincoln (1527–1590), also known as The Fair Geraldine, Irish noblewoman and member of the FitzGerald dynasty
- Elizabeth Grey, Countess of Kildare (born 1497), English noblewoman, and the second wife of Irish peer Gerald FitzGerald, 9th Earl of Kildare
- Duffy Ayers (1915–2017), English portrait painter
- Elizabeth Fitzgerald (volleyball) (born 1980), American volleyball player
