= John Arundell (died 1557) =

Member of the Parliament of England

Sir John Arundell (c. 1500 – 1557), was MP for Cornwall in 1554. He was also Sheriff of Cornwall in 1541–42 and 1554.

He was the eldest son of John Arundell (1474–1545), who was termed "the most important man in the county", and his first wife, Lady Eleanor Grey, daughter of Thomas Grey, 1st Marquis of Dorset and Cecily Bonville, 7th Baroness Harington. The politician Thomas Arundell of Wardour Castle, who was executed for treason in 1552, was his younger brother. John was arrested and imprisoned with his brother, but never stood trial. He was in favour with the Catholic Queen Mary I, since unlike his brother he inclined to the Roman Catholic religion.

== Marriage and issue ==
He married Elizabeth Dannett, daughter of Sir Gerald Dannett of Dannett's Hall, Bromkinsthorpe, Leicestershire and had issue:

- Sir John Arundell (c.1530–90), kt.
- Thomas Arundell (died 1571) of Tremere who married Elizabeth Trengrove of Nance and had issue one son.
- George Arundell (died 1578) married Elizabeth Borlase, widow of William St Aubyn but had no issue; died 17 May 1578. They are commemorated by a brass at St Mawgan.
- Humphrey Arundell
- Katherine Arundell (1586) married John Tregian (died 1570) and had issue one son and two daughters.
- Johanna Arundell who married 1st, Robert Fitzjames, possibly the eldest son of Nicholas Fitzjames of Redlynch, Wiltshire, and had issue a daughter; married 2nd, Leonard Bosgrave.
- Edward Arundell (died 1587) who died without issue, 4 November 1587
- Mary Arundell
- Elizabeth Arundell
- Isabel Arundell
- Cecily Arundell (c.1526-78) died unmarried and was buried at St Mawgan, where she is commemorated by a brass.
- Dorothy Arundell

== Memorial ==
The memorial brass commemorating John and Elizabeth at St Mawgan in Pydar is lost, but a fragment still remains.

Parliament of England
Preceded by John Carminowe; Richard Roscarrock	Member of Parliament for Cornwall; April 1554; With: Richard Roscarrock	Succeeded by Thomas Treffry I Henry Chiverton
Political offices
Preceded by John Reskymer	High Sheriff of Cornwall; 1541–1542	Succeeded by John Arundell of Trerice
