= Eleanor Grey =

English noblewoman

- Born: England
- Died: d. by December 1503; England
- Noble family: Grey; Bonville
- Spouse: Sir John Arundell
- Issue: Sir John Arundell (c. 1500 – 1557); Sir Thomas Arundell; Elizabeth Arundel; Jane Arundel
- Father: Thomas Grey, 1st Marquess of Dorset
- Mother: Cecily Bonville, Baroness Harington and Bonville

Lady Eleanor Arundell (died before December 1503), was an English noblewoman, and the first wife of Sir John Arundell of Lanherne in Cornwall, "the most important man in the county", being Receiver-General of the Duchy of Cornwall. Their monumental brass in the church at St Columb Major in Cornwall was described by E. H. W. Dunkin (1882) as "perhaps the most elaborate and interesting brass to be found in Cornwall." Her father was Thomas Grey, 1st Marquess of Dorset. Eleanor was an ancestor of the later Barons Arundell of Wardour.

== Family and early years ==
Eleanor Grey was a daughter of Thomas Grey, 1st Marquess of Dorset, and Cecily Bonville, Baroness Harington and Bonville, one of the wealthiest heiresses in England in the latter half of the 15th century. Elizabeth's paternal grandmother was Elizabeth Woodville, Queen Consort of King Edward IV of England, and thus her father was the half-brother of Edward V of England and Richard, Duke of York, the 'Princes in the Tower', and of their sister, Elizabeth of York, Queen Consort to Henry VII of England.

Eleanor had 13 siblings, including her eldest brother Thomas Grey, 2nd Marquess of Dorset (the grandfather of Lady Jane Grey, briefly Queen of England), who succeeded their father when he died in September 1501, when she was about four years old. Two years later, their mother, Cecily married Henry Stafford, 1st Earl of Wiltshire, which caused many quarrels over their inheritance.

Her maternal grandmother was Katherine Neville, Baroness Hastings who was a direct descendant of Ralph Neville, 1st Earl of Westmorland and Joan Beaufort, Countess of Westmoreland, a daughter of John of Gaunt by his third wife, Katherine de Roët, making her a direct descendant of Edward III.

== Marriage and issue ==
- Eleanor was married to Sir John Arundell and had issue:
  - Sir John Arundell (c. 1500 – 1557), eldest son and heir, MP for Cornwall in 1554
  - Sir Thomas Arundell (c. 1502 – 1552), of Shaftesbury, Dorset and Wardour Castle, Wiltshire, MP for Dorset 1545 and 1547. He married Margaret Howard, daughter and coheiress of Lord Edmund Howard, and sister of Queen Katherine Howard, fifth wife of King Henry VIII;
  - Elizabeth Arundel, who married Sir Richard Edgecombe;
  - Jane Arundel, who died testate 1577.

== Memorial brass ==
Eleanor Grey died on an unknown date sometime around 1503. Her memorial brass is located at St. Columb Major Church in Cornwall although it is not clear if she is actually buried there.

Eleanor appears on the memorial brass of Sir John Arundell, but her name is incorrectly stated as 'Elizabeth', which was her sister's name. She is depicted on the right hand of the knight, her head rests on a square cushion, the shield with the following arms: Per pale, the dexter quarterly of six, — 1. Six swallows (Arundell); 2. Four fusils conjoined in fesse (Dynham); 3. In chief a double arch, in base a single one (Arches); 4. An escutcheon within an orle of martlets (Chideocke of Chideocke, co. Dorset); 5. A bend (Carminow); 6. As the first. impaling, quarterly of eight, — 1. Barry of six, in chief three roundels (Grey, Marquis of Dorset); 2. A maunche (Hastings); 3. Barry of ten, an orle of martlets (de Valence, Earl of Pembroke); 4. Seven mascles conjoined three, three and one (de Quincy, Earl of Winchester); 5. Lost, probably a cinquefoil, for Bellomont, Earl of Leicester; 6. Lost, probably a fesse and canton, for Widville, Earl Rivers; 7. Six mullets, pierced, three, two and one (Bonville); 8. A fret (Harrington).

== Ancestry ==
Ancestors of Eleanor Grey

16. Reginald Grey, 3rd Baron Grey de Ruthyn
8. Sir Edward Grey
17. Joan Astley, Baroness Astley
4. John Grey of Groby
18. Sir Henry Ferrers
9. Elizabeth Ferrers, 6th Baroness Ferrers of Groby
19. Lady Isabel Mowbray
2. Thomas Grey, 1st Marquess of Dorset
20. Sir Richard Wydevill
10. Richard Woodville, 1st Earl Rivers
21. Elizabeth Bodulgate
5. Elizabeth Woodville
22. Pierre I de Luxembourg, Comte de St. Pol, Brienne and Conversano
11. Jacquetta of Luxembourg
23. Margherita del Balzo
1. Lady Eleanor Grey
24. William Bonville, 1st Baron Bonville
12. Sir William Bonville
25. Margaret Grey
6. William Bonville, 6th Baron Harington
26. William Harington, 5th Baron Harington
13. Elizabeth Harrington
27. Margaret Hill
3. Cecily Bonville, Baroness Harington and Bonville
28. Ralph de Neville, 1st Earl of Westmorland
14. Richard Neville, 5th Earl of Salisbury
29. Lady Joan Beaufort
7. Lady Katherine Neville
30. Thomas Montacute, 4th Earl of Salisbury
15. Alice Montacute, 5th Countess of Salisbury
31. Lady Eleanor Holland
