= John Arundell (died 1545) =

English knight

Sir John Arundell (died 1545), detail from his monumental brass, St. Columb Major, 1890 engraving

Arms of Arundel of Lanherne, Cornwall, a junior line of which later became Baron Arundell of Wardour: Sable, six martlets argent. These are early canting arms, based on the French for swallow hirondelle. They were recorded for Reinfred de Arundel (died circa 1280), lord of the manor of Lanherne, Cornwall, in the 15th-century Shirley Roll of Arms

Sir John Arundell (1474–1545) Knight Banneret, of Lanherne, St. Mawgan-in-Pyder, Cornwall, was Receiver-General of the Duchy of Cornwall. Called "the most important man in the county", Sir John's monumental brass in the church at St. Columb Major in Cornwall was described by Dunkin (1882) as "perhaps the most elaborate and interesting brass to be found in Cornwall".

== Origins ==
Arundell was the eldest son of Sir Thomas Arundell (1454–1485) KB, by his wife Katharine Dynham, third daughter of John Dynham (1406–1458) and wife Joan Arches, and coheiress to her brother John, 1st Baron Dynham. His family's establishment was at Lanherne House, mainly built in the 16th and 17th centuries. The senior branch of the ancient Cornish family of Arundell had been seated at Lanherne since the middle of the 13th century.

== Career ==
In 1506, under King Henry VII, he became Receiver-General of the Duchy of Cornwall, and in 1509 was confirmed by Henry VIII in that office for life. He was knighted by bathing on the eve of All Saints, 31 October 1494 and Knight banneret at the Battle of the Spurs in 1513, during the expedition to Terouenne and Tournay. In 1525 he declined ennoblement on the plea of insufficient wealth. His family had remained strictly Catholic unlike his relatives the Arundells of Trerice.

== Marriages and children ==
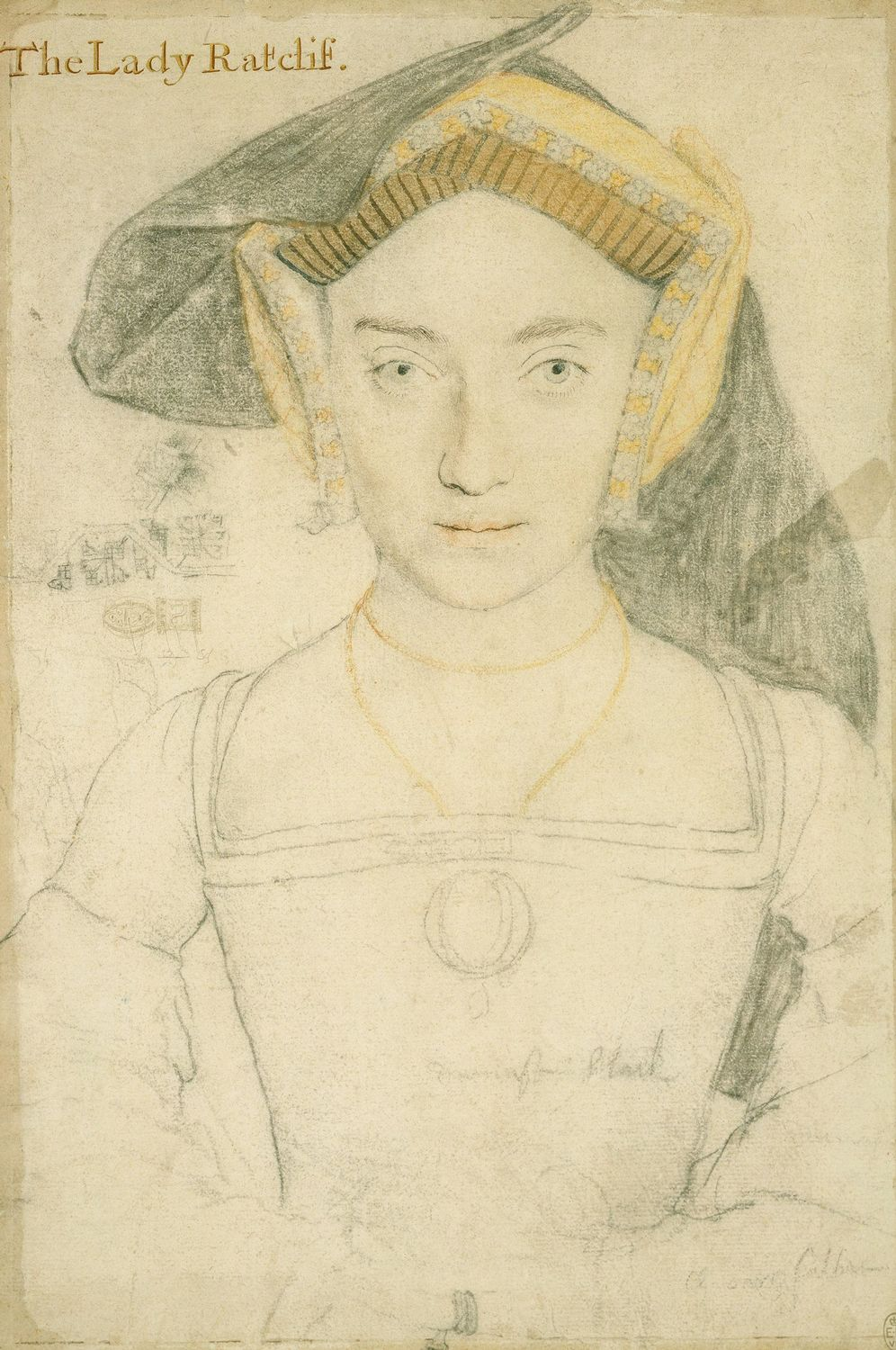
Mary Arundell, (Lady Radclif) only daughter of John and Katherine

Arundell married twice:

- Firstly to Lady Eleanor Grey, daughter of Thomas Grey, 1st Marquess of Dorset, and his second wife Cecily Bonville, 7th Baroness Harington. Eleanor Grey died in 1503, but provided John with several issue, including:
  - Sir John Arundell, (died 1557), eldest son and heir, Knighted, MP for Cornwall in 1554, married Elizabeth Danet, daughter of Sir Gerald Danet of Danet's Hall, Bromkinsthorpe, Leicestershire.
  - Sir Thomas Arundell (c. 1502–1552), of Shaftesbury, Dorset and Wardour Castle, Wiltshire, MP for Dorset 1545 and 1547. He married Margaret Howard, daughter and coheiress of Lord Edmund Howard and Joyce Culpeper, and sister of Queen Catherine Howard, fifth wife of King Henry VIII;
  - Elizabeth Arundel, who married Sir Richard Edgcumbe;
  - Jane Arundel, who died testate in 1577. She married Robert Spurway of Spurway Manor;
- Secondly in 1507 to Katherine Grenville, youngest daughter of Sir Thomas Grenville (died 1514) of Stowe in the parish of Kilkhampton in Cornwall, Sheriff of Cornwall in 1481 and 1486. and lord of the manor of Bideford in Devon, and his first wife Isabel Gilbert. They had one daughter:
  - Mary Arundell (died 1557) who married firstly, Robert Radcliffe, 1st Earl of Sussex and secondly, Henry FitzAlan, 19th Earl of Arundel. She was a Lady in waiting to Jane Seymour (1536), Anne of Cleaves, and Princess Mary in 1539. She is sometimes confused with her stepdaughter Mary FitzAlan.

== Monumental brass ==
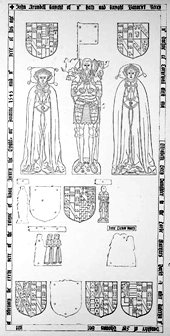
Monumental brass of Sir John Arundell (died 1545), St. Columb Major; 1890 engraving. Right: Katherine Grenville; Left: Elizabeth Grey

His splendid and originally richly enamelled monumental brass survives in the parish church of St. Columb Major. It is in a fairly complete state, and shows Sir John bare-headed but otherwise in full armour, between his two wives dressed in gowns, mantles, and pedimental headdresses. Below them are two smaller male figures, one partly perfect in armour, and underneath again, six female children, of whom two remain. The brasses are firmly fixed to the original slab of grey marble by apparently the original fastenings. They were originally in the Arundell chapel (a chantry built by the Arundells on the south side of the chancel of the parish church), and were early in the 19th century covered with some pews which were then placed in the chapel. On the restoration of the church later that century, the chapel being re-pewed, they were removed to their present position, which is an unfortunate selection, as it subjects them to a large amount of wear from the feet of persons passing over them, they being on the floor of the nave immediately below the chancel steps. The slab is now the southernmost of two and measures 7 feet 4 inches by 3 feet 9 inches; around it, 3 inches from the edge, is a plain fillet of brass bearing this inscription, partly missing, on a ledger-line:

John Arundell Knyght of ye Bath and Knyght Banneret Recey(ver of) ye Duchye of Cornwall first ma(ryed ye Lady) Elizabeth Grey daughter to the Lorde Marquis of Dorset & (Catherine) daughter of Syr Thomas Gr(enville Knyght & dyed ye ey)ght of ffebruary the xxxvi yere of the reigne of Kyng Henry the eyght An° Domini 1545 and ye yere of his age (71)

The brass bearing those parts of the inscription enclosed in brackets has been lost. In the upper part of the stone are the finely cut figures in brass of Sir John Arundell and his two wives. Sir John is in the military costume of that period; behind his right shoulder rises a staff bearing a square banner of a knight banneret, the matrix alone surviving as the brass itself of this with the crest and a portion of the helmet and lambrequin, upon which the head of the knight rests, has been lost; the banner was probably charged with the quartered coat of Arundell without any impalement.

=== Elizabeth (Eleanor) Grey brass ===
Above Elizabeth Grey, the lady on the right hand of the knight, whose head rests on a square cushion, is a shield with the following arms: Per pale, the dexter quarterly of six, — 1. Six swallows (Arundell); 2. Four fusils conjoined in fesse (Dynham); 3. In chief a double arch, in base a single one (Arches); 4. An escutcheon within an orle of martlets (Chideocke of Chideocke, co. Dorset); 5. A bend (Carminow); 6. As the first. impaling, quarterly of eight, — 1. Barry of six, in chief three roundels (Grey, Marquis of Dorset); 2. A maunche (Hastings); 3. Barry of ten, an orle of martlets (de Valence, Earl of Pembroke); 4. Seven mascles conjoined three, three and one (de Quincy, Earl of Winchester); 5. Lost, probably a cinquefoil, for Bellomont, Earl of Leicester; 6. Lost, probably a fesse and canton, for Widville, Earl Rivers; 7. Six mullets, pierced, three, two and one (Bonville); 8. A fret (Harrington).

=== Katherine Grenville brass ===
Above Katherine Grenville, the lady on the left hand of the knight, is a shield: Arundell as before, impaling, 1 and 4, Three clarions (Grenville); 2 and 3, on a bend three roundels (Whitleigh).

=== Lower brasses ===
Beneath the principal figures, which measure 29 inches in height, are two shields, flanked on either side by a small figure with a fillet of brass over each for their names; both the fillets are gone, as are also the figure and shield on the right-hand side; they probably represented Sir John Arundell and his arms, ancestor of the Arundells of Lanherne and Chideocke. The head of the remaining figure is also gone, the shield is charged with the arms of Arundell quarterly as above, impaling, quarterly of four, 1. Howard, Duke of Norfolk; 2. De Brotherton; 3. Warren; 4. Mowbray. These are for Sir Thomas Arundell, Knt., who married Margaret Howard, daughter and co-heir of Lord Edmund Howard, third son of Thomas, Duke of Norfolk; she was sister to Katherine, fifth wife of Henry VIII. Sir Thomas Arundell was the second son of Sir John by his first wife, Lady Elizabeth Grey, and was an ancestor of the later Barons Arundell of Wardour.

Beneath these two shields are the matrixes of two groups of children, the only part remaining being the label over the group to the viewer's right, which bears the names "Joan Eleanor Mary". Below these, and forming the lowest part of the monument, were four shields, of which only three survive:

- First shield, for Elizabeth Arundell, daughter of Sir John Arundell, who married Sir Richard Edgcumbe of Mount Edgcumbe, Sheriff of Devon in 1543. Sir Richard married secondly to Winefred Essex, daughter of William Essex, Esq. Blazon: Per pale the dexter quarterly, 1 and 4, on a bend ermines, cotised, three boars' heads couped (Edgcumbe); 2 and 3, Semee-de-lis, and a lion rampant gardant (Holland) impaling Arundell quarterly of six as above.
- Second shield, lost, but was doubtless charged with the arms of Arundell as above, probably for Jane Arundell, daughter of Sir John Arundell, who died unmarried in 1577, her will dated 2 Sep. 1575, was proved 31 Oct. 1577.
- Third shield, for Mary Arundell, per pale, the dexter quarterly of eight, 1. A bend engrailed (Rateliffe); 2. A fesse between two chevrons (Fitz -Walter); 3. A lion rampant crowned within a bordure; 4. A saltire engrailed; 5. lost; 6. Three bars; 7. Semee-de-lis; 8. An infant swaddled, thereon an eagle preying, wings addorsed. Impaling Arundell quarterly as above. Mary, daughter of the said Sir John Arundell, married Robert Ratcliffe, K.G., Earl of Sussex, so created 8 December 1529; she was his third wife. Their only son, Sir John Ratcliffe, Knt., died without issue.
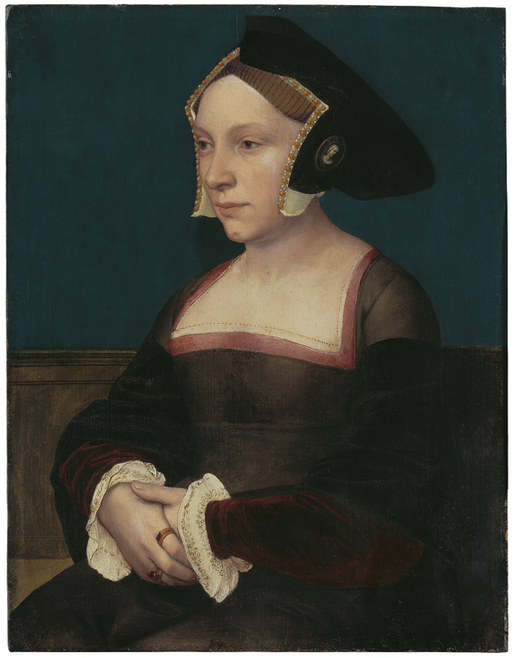
- Katherine Grey, Lady Maltravers, 1530s
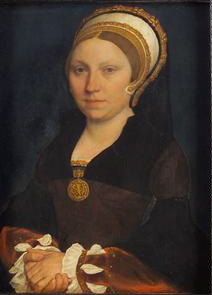
  Katherine Grey, Lady Maltravers, 1540s
  Fourth shield, another one for Mary Arundell, per pale the dexter quarterly of four, 1. A lion rampant (Fitz-Alan); 2. Three bars; 3. A fesse and canton (Widville); 4. 1 and 4 a fret, 2 and 3 a chief (Maltravers); impaling Arundell quarterly as above. The last-named Mary Arundell, widow of Robert, Earl of Sussex, married secondly to Henry Fitz-Alan, 19th Earl of Arundel, K.G.; she was his second wife, the first being her cousin Lady Katherine Grey, daughter of Thomas, 2nd Marquis of Dorset, by which lady the Earl alone had issue, viz., a son, who died without issue, and two daughters, his co-heirs, Joanna, married John, Lord Lumley, and died without issue; and Mary, married Thomas Howard, Duke of Norfolk, by which marriage the Earldom and Castle of Arundell came to the Howards.

== Death and burial ==
Sir John Arundell died on 8 February 1545, and although it might be presumed from the presence of his brass that he was buried at St. Columb Major, he was in fact buried in the church of St. Mary Woolnoth, Lombard Street, in the City of London, as is evidenced by the following inscription at one time in that church, transcribed in 1631 by the antiquarian John Weever (1576–1632)

Here lieth Sir John Arundell, Knight of the Bath and Knight Banneret, Receivor of the Duchy...Grey daughter to the Lord Marquese Dorset, who died 8 Febr: the 36 of the reigne of King Hen. the 8

== Sources ==
- Goring, J.J., Biography of Arundell, Sir John (by 1500–57), of Lanherne, published in The History of Parliament: the House of Commons 1509–1558, ed. S.T. Bindoff, 1982
- Hamilton Rogers, W.H. The Strife of the Roses & Days of the Tudors in the West, Exeter, 1890, Chapter 6, pp. 155–183, "They did cast him", biography of Sir Thomas Arundell, KB.
- on-line text, freefictionbookson-line text, with images, Project Gutenburg
- Richardson, Douglas (2011). Everingham, Kimball G. (ed.). Magna Carta Ancestry: A Study in Colonial and Medieval Families. Vol. I (2nd ed.). Salt Lake City, Utah. ISBN 978-1449966379.
- Richardson, Douglas (2011). Everingham, Kimball G. (ed.). Magna Carta Ancestry: A Study in Colonial and Medieval Families. Vol. II (2nd ed.). Salt Lake City, Utah. ISBN 978-1449966386.
