= Thomas Arundell of Wardour Castle =

English landowner

Sir Thomas Arundell
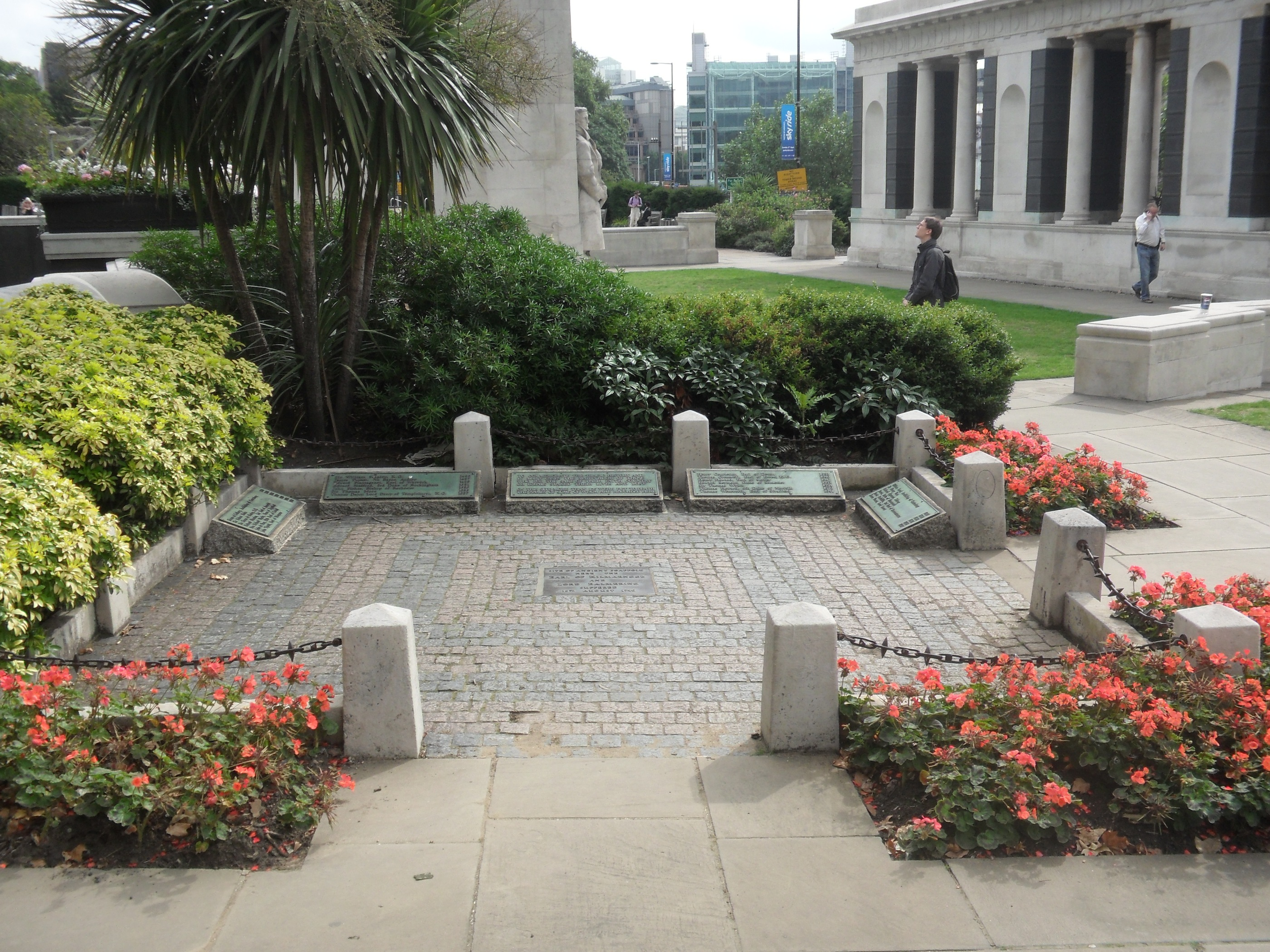
- Site of the scaffold on Tower Hill
- Born: c.1502
- Died: 26 February 1552; Tower Hill, London
- Buried: Church of St Peter ad Vincula
- Spouse: Margaret Howard
- Father: Sir John Arundell
- Mother: Eleanor Grey

Arms of Arundel of Lanherne, Cornwall, later Baron Arundell of Wardour: Sable, six martlets argent. These are early canting arms, based on the French for swallow hirondelle. They were recorded for Reinfred de Arundel (d. circa 1280), lord of the manor of Lanherne, Cornwall, in the 15th-century Shirley Roll of Arms

Sir Thomas Arundell of Wardour Castle in Wiltshire (c. 1502 – 26 February 1552) was a Cornish administrator and alleged conspirator.

Arundell was connected by birth and marriage to the crown and to several of the most important families in England, and by the time of the death of King Henry VIII was one of the most experienced government officers in England. Those in power had concerns about his influence and his family's devotion to the old religion. Vague and unproven allegations of complicity in the Prayer Book Rebellion in 1549 were made against him. In late 1551 he temporarily aligned himself with the Protector Somerset, thereby putting himself in conflict with John Dudley, Earl of Warwick. He was arrested and charged with conspiring to overthrow the government and murder the Earl. He was convicted, and beheaded on Tower Hill on 26 February 1552. His property was confiscated, but in June 1552 the Crown began restoring it to his widow and, from 1553, to his son.

== Biography ==
Thomas Arundell, born about 1502, was the younger of the two sons of Sir John Arundell (1474–1545) of Lanherne, St. Mawgan-in-Pyder, Cornwall, Receiver General of the Duchy of Cornwall and "the most important man in the county", by his first wife, Lady Eleanor Grey (d. by December 1503), the daughter of Thomas Grey, 1st Marquess of Dorset.

Arundell was educated at Lincoln's Inn, and began his career in the household of Cardinal Thomas Wolsey, where he was a contemporary of Thomas Cromwell. He was knighted at the coronation of Queen Anne Boleyn.

Arundell held a number of administrative positions, principally in the West Country. He was the first receiver of the Court of Augmentations for Cornwall, Devon, Somerset and Dorset, and in 1533 succeeded his father as Receiver-General of the Duchy of Cornwall. He was a Justice of the Peace for Cornwall, Dorset and Somerset during the reigns of Henry VIII and Edward VI, and was appointed to commissions for gaol delivery, oyer and terminer, and the defence of the counties of the south-west coastline. He commanded the Dorset militia during both the Pilgrimage of Grace in 1536–7, and King Henry VIII's expedition to France in 1544. He was twice High Sheriff of Dorset and Somerset (1531), was keeper of the royal parks in Dorset, and in 1539 sat on the Council of the West with his father. He was elected Member of Parliament for Dorset in 1545 and 1547.

Both his cousin, Henry Grey, 3rd Marquess of Dorset, and Henry Percy, 6th Earl of Northumberland, employed Arundell in the management of their estates. He also served as receiver to Queen Anne of Cleves.

According to Agnes Strickland, his wife Margaret Howard, Lady Arundel was a Lady Attendant to Queen Katherine Howard, her sister the Queen.

Later he would serve as Chancellor of the Household to Queen Katherine Parr.

Arundell's role as one of the commissioners for the dissolution of the monasteries in the West Country enabled him to acquire a number of properties formerly belonging to religious houses. In 1547 he purchased Wardour Castle in Wiltshire.

Arundell was connected by birth and marriage to the crown and to several of the most important families in England, and by the time of the death of King Henry VIII was one of the most experienced government officers in England. However, those in power at the beginning of the reign of King Edward VI removed his name from the late King's list of proposed honours, reflecting their concern with his influence and his family's devotion to the old religion. Vague and unproven allegations of complicity in the Prayer Book Rebellion in 1549 were made against him and against his brother, Sir John Arundell (c.1550–1557), leading to their imprisonment in 1550 and again in 1551, and marking the end of Sir Thomas Arundell's career. In late 1551 he temporarily aligned himself with the Protector Somerset, thereby putting himself in conflict with John Dudley, Earl of Warwick. He was arrested and charged with conspiring to overthrow the government and murder the Earl. Arundell consistently protested his innocence, but was convicted, beheaded on Tower Hill on 26 February 1552, and buried in the Church of St Peter ad Vincula. His property was confiscated, although in June 1552 the Crown began restoring it to his widow and, from 1553, to his son Matthew Arundell. His widow, Margaret, died on 10 October 1571, and was buried at Tisbury, Wiltshire.

== Marriage and issue ==
By settlement dated 20 November 1530 Arundell married Margaret Howard (c. 1515 – 10 October 1571), the daughter of Lord Edmund Howard (third son of Thomas Howard, 2nd Duke of Norfolk, by his first wife, Elizabeth Tilney), and Joyce Culpeper. Margaret was the sister of Queen Katherine Howard, the fifth wife of King Henry VIII, and a first cousin of the King's second wife, Queen Anne Boleyn.

By Margaret Howard, Arundell had two sons and three daughters:

- Sir Matthew Arundell of Wardour Castle (c.1534/1535 – 24 December 1598), who married his second cousin Margaret Willoughby, the daughter of Sir Henry Willoughby (slain 27 August 1549 during Kett's Rebellion) of Wollaton, Nottinghamshire, and Anne Grey (died 1548), (Note: De Lisle states that she predeceased her husband by 18 months.) the daughter of Thomas Grey, 2nd Marquess of Dorset, and Margaret Wotton, and by her had two sons, Thomas Arundell, 1st Baron Arundell of Wardour (c.1560 – 7 November 1639), and William Arundell (after 1560 – 16 February 1592), esquire.
- Charles Arundell (d. 9 December 1587), who died unmarried and without issue.
- Margaret Arundell.
- Dorothy Arundell (c. 1535 – c. 1578), who married Sir Henry Weston.
- Jane Arundell (c. 1536 - 1593), who married Sir William Bevyle or Bevill (died 1600) of Killigarth.

The Arundells of Lanherne, Cornwall, and of Chideock, Dorset, are descended from Sir Thomas Arundell's elder brother, Sir John Arundell (of Lanherne, died 1557).

== Notes ==
Honorary titles
Preceded by ?	Custos Rotulorum of Dorset bef. 1547–1552	Succeeded by Lord Thomas Howard
