= Elizabeth Fiennes =

Elizabeth Fiennes may refer to:

- Elizabeth Fiennes de Clinton (1527–1590), Irish noblewoman
- Elizabeth Blount, married name Fiennes/Clinton
