= Elizabeth Grey, Countess of Kildare =

Anglo-Irish noblewoman

Elizabeth Grey
- Countess of Kildare
- Born: c.1497 England
- Died: After 1548; England
- Noble family: House of Grey; Bonville
- Spouse: Gerald FitzGerald, 9th Earl of Kildare
- Issue: Gerald FitzGerald, 11th Earl of Kildare; Elizabeth FitzGerald; Edward FitzGerald; Mary FitzGerald; Thomas FitzGerald; Cecily FitzGerald
- Father: Thomas Grey, 1st Marquess of Dorset
- Mother: Cecily Bonville, 7th Baroness Harington
- Occupation: Maid of Honour

Lady Elizabeth FitzGerald, Countess of Kildare (c.1497 – after 1548), was an Anglo-Irish noblewoman, the second wife of Gerald FitzGerald, 9th Earl of Kildare. Her father was Thomas Grey, 1st Marquess of Dorset. Her mother, Cecily, was the wealthiest heiress in England after succeeding to the title of suo jure 7th Baroness Harington of Aldingham and then the title of suo jure 2nd Baroness Bonville.

She went to France in 1514 as one of the Maids of Honour of Mary Tudor, Queen of France, and remained to serve the latter's successor, Queen Claude, in the same capacity.

== Family and early years ==
Elizabeth Grey was born in about 1497, a daughter of Thomas Grey, 1st Marquess of Dorset, member of the House of Grey, and Cecily Bonville, Baroness Harington and Bonville, one of the wealthiest heiresses in England in the latter half of the 15th century. Elizabeth's paternal grandmother was Elizabeth Woodville, Queen consort of King Edward IV.

Elizabeth had 13 siblings, including her eldest brother Thomas Grey, 2nd Marquess of Dorset, who succeeded their father when he died in September 1501, when she was about four years old. Two years later, their mother, Cecily married Henry Stafford, 1st Earl of Wiltshire, which caused many quarrels over their inheritance. On one occasion, Cardinal Thomas Wolsey was forced to intervene on behalf of King Henry VIII, and he ordered both Cecily and Thomas to contribute to the dowries of Elizabeth and her three surviving sisters.

She was appointed one of the Maids of Honour to her first-cousin Princess Mary Tudor in 1514, and accompanied her to France when the princess set out to marry King Louis XII. She remained at the French court when Queen Mary's other English ladies were sent home, and stayed on to serve Mary's successor, Queen Claude, consort of the new King Francis I, in the same capacity. Elizabeth's fellow English Maids of Honour, who also were allowed to remain behind in Queen Claude's household, were Anne Boleyn, and Mary Boleyn.

Elizabeth was one of Queen Catherine of Aragon's attendants at the Field of the Cloth of Gold in 1520.

== Marriage and issue ==
She married Gerald "Gearóid Og" FitzGerald, 9th Earl of Kildare in London in about 1522. His first wife, Elizabeth Zouche had died, leaving him a son, Thomas, and three daughters. By his marriage to Elizabeth, who was Henry VIII's cousin, Gerald gained much influence at court. Elizabeth was styled as the Countess of Kildare. The match, while advantageous to Gerald, was also partially based on the physical attraction the couple had for one another. Historian Mary Anne Everett Green described Gerald as having been quite handsome in appearance, and he in turn was pleased by Elizabeth. He had been a kind husband to his first wife, and his second marriage was also happy. According to historian Barbara Jean Harris, Elizabeth married Gerald against her father's will; however, in 1527 her mother forgave her by granting Elizabeth a dowry of £1000. She added the following as means of explanation for the money: "forasmuch as the said marriage is honourable and I and all her friends have cause to be content with the same". In 1523, Elizabeth returned with her husband to Ireland, where he served as Lord Deputy of Ireland (1524–1525, 1532–1534), and as Deputy to the King's Lieutenant of Ireland (1533).

Extant letters she wrote home to England, show that Elizabeth had taken a keen interest in the Irish political situation.

Together Gerald and Elizabeth had at least six children:

- Lord Gerald FitzGerald, 11th Earl of Kildare, known to history as "The Wizard Earl", (25 February 1525 – 16 November 1585), married Mabel Browne, by whom he had issue.
- Elizabeth FitzGerald, known as "The Fair Geraldine" (1527 – March 1590), married firstly, Anthony Browne (died 1548), by whom she had two children who both died young; and secondly Edward Clinton, 1st Earl of Lincoln. Her last marriage was childless.
- Edward FitzGerald (17 January 1528 – 1597), married Agnes Leigh, by whom he had issue, including Gerald FitzGerald, 14th Earl of Kildare.
- Mary (or Margaret) FitzGerald, married Richard Nugent, 3rd Baron Delvin, by whom she had issue.
- Anne FitzGerald
- Katherine FitzGerald (died after 7 April 1547), who married firstly Jenico Preston, 3rd Viscount Gormanston; and secondly Richard St. Lawrence, 7th Baron Howth.

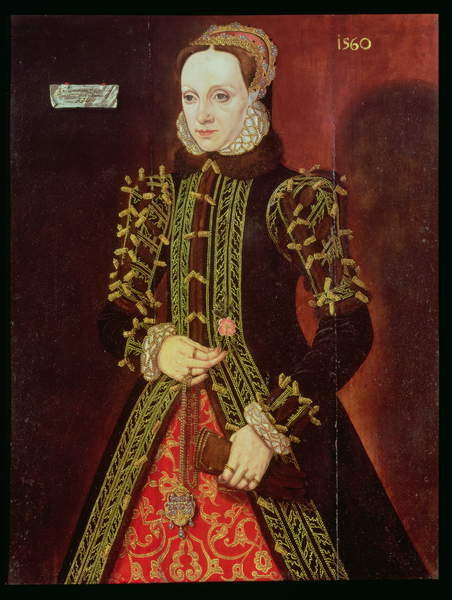
Elizabeth Grey's daughter, "the fair Geraldine"

In 1531, a private act of Parliament assured her an income of £200 per annum as well as the Irish manor of Portlester.

In October 1533, Elizabeth brought her daughter, Elizabeth FitzGerald to the English court. The girl, aged six, became a companion to the infant Princess Elizabeth, daughter of King Henry VIII, and Elizabeth Grey's erstwhile companion at the French court, Anne Boleyn, whom the King had married in January of that year.

Later, Elizabeth Grey was allegedly part of the conservative faction at court who plotted against Queen Anne.

Elizabeth's husband, the Earl of Kildare, who was imprisoned in the Tower of London on charges of corruption and plotting rebellion in Ireland, died in 1534. Elizabeth had remained with him, nursing him throughout his imprisonment from July 1534 until his death on 12 December. The Earl had received a gunshot wound at the end of 1532 in an attack he had led against the O'Carroll clan at Birr.

Elizabeth retired to her brother Leonard's manor of Beaumanoir, in Leicestershire, while her younger sons were raised at court alongside Prince Edward. Later her son, Edward joined her.

== Rebellion in Ireland ==
Elizabeth's stepson, "Silken Thomas" and her five brothers-in-law were executed for rebellion at Tyburn in 1537. Her own brother, Lord Leonard Grey, the incumbent Lord Deputy of Ireland, had quelled the rebellion. Her eldest daughter, Elizabeth, was sent to the household of Princess Mary at Hunsdon. It was during that time that the poet Henry Howard, Earl of Surrey would immortalise the ten-year-old girl as "The Fair Geraldine" in his sonnet, "The Geraldine", which he wrote while briefly imprisoned for striking a courtier.

Her eldest son, Gerald, who could not succeed to the earldom of Kildare as a result of its having been forfeited to the Crown, immediately went on the run in Ireland, where in County Tyrconnell, along with other disgruntled clans, formed the Geraldine League. When the federation was defeated in Monaghan in 1539, he fled to the Continent.

As a result of Gerald's successful escape, Lord Leonard Grey was attainted and executed for High Treason in July 1541 at the Tower of London by the orders of Henry VIII. Gerald first went to France, and then Italy, where he would remain until his return to England in 1548, in the company of Elizabeth's chaplain. He was received at court by the new King, Edward VI, who returned his confiscated lands.

He succeeded to the title of 11th Earl of Kildare in 1554 during the reign of Queen Mary I. After a career of fluctuating fortunes, he died in London in 1585, technically a free man but forbidden to return home to Ireland.

Elizabeth Grey died on an unknown date sometime after 1548.

== Ancestry ==
Ancestors of Elizabeth Grey, Countess of Kildare

16. Reginald Grey, 3rd Baron Grey de Ruthyn
8. Sir Edward Grey
17. Joan Astley, Baroness Astley
4. John Grey of Groby
18. Sir Henry Ferrers
9. Elizabeth Ferrers, 6th Baroness Ferrers of Groby
19. Lady Isabel Mowbray
2. Thomas Grey, 1st Marquess of Dorset
20. Sir Richard Wydevill
10. Richard Woodville, 1st Earl Rivers
21. Elizabeth Bodulgate
5. Elizabeth Woodville
22. Pierre I de Luxembourg, Comte de St. Pol, Brienne and Conversano
11. Jacquetta of Luxembourg
23. Margherita del Balzo
1. Lady Elizabeth Grey
24. William Bonville, 1st Baron Bonville
12. Sir William Bonville
25. Margaret Grey
6. William Bonville, 6th Baron Harington
26. William Harington, 5th Baron Harington
13. Elizabeth Harrington
27. Margaret Hill
3. Cecily Bonville, Baroness Harington and Bonville
28. Ralph de Neville, 1st Earl of Westmorland
14. Richard Neville, 5th Earl of Salisbury
29. Lady Joan Beaufort
7. Lady Katherine Neville
30. Thomas Montacute, 4th Earl of Salisbury
15. Lady Alice Montacute, 5th Countess of Salisbury
31. Lady Eleanor Holland
