= Baron Bonville =

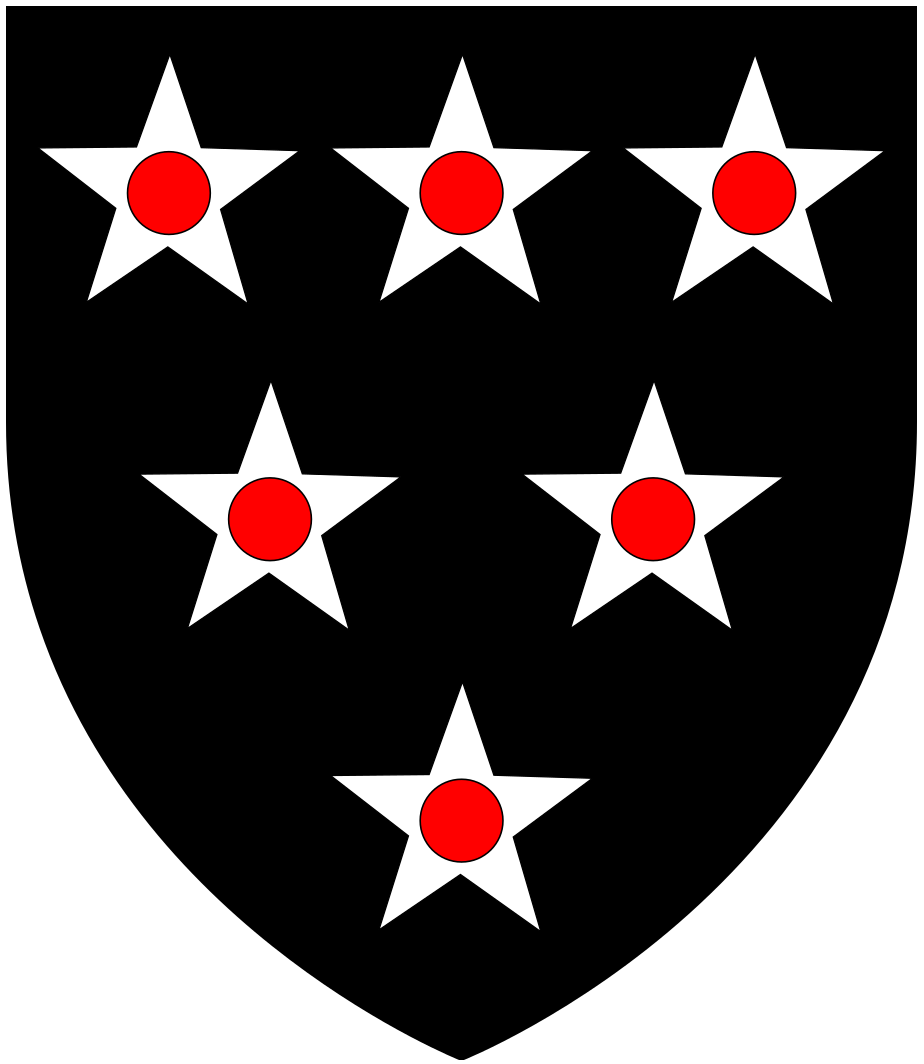
Arms of Bonville: Sable, six mullets argent pierced gules

The title of Baron Bonville was created once in the Peerage of England. On 10 March 1449, Sir William Bonville II was summoned to Parliament. On his death in 1461, the barony was inherited by his great-granddaughter Cecily Bonville, who two months before succeeded as Baroness Harington, with which title the barony merged until 1554, when both baronies were forfeited. From her death in 1529 to the forfeiture in 1554, the baronies were merged with the title of Marquess of Dorset.

== Barons Bonville ==
- William Bonville, 1st Baron Bonville (1392–1461)
- Cecily Bonville, 2nd Baroness Bonville, 7th Baroness Harington (1460–1529)
- Thomas Grey, 2nd Marquess of Dorset, 3rd Baron Bonville, 8th Baron Harington, 8th Baron Ferrers of Groby (1477–1530)
- Henry Grey, 1st Duke of Suffolk, 3rd Marquess of Dorset, 4th Baron Bonville, 9th Baron Harington, 9th Baron Ferrers of Groby (1517–1554), eldest son of the 2nd Marquess, was created Duke of Suffolk in 1551. He was found guilty of treason, attainted and all of his honours forfeit in 1554. It also became abeyant in 1889 while still under attainder.
