= Elizabeth FitzGerald, Countess of Lincoln =

Irish noblewoman

Elizabeth FitzGerald
- Countess of Lincoln
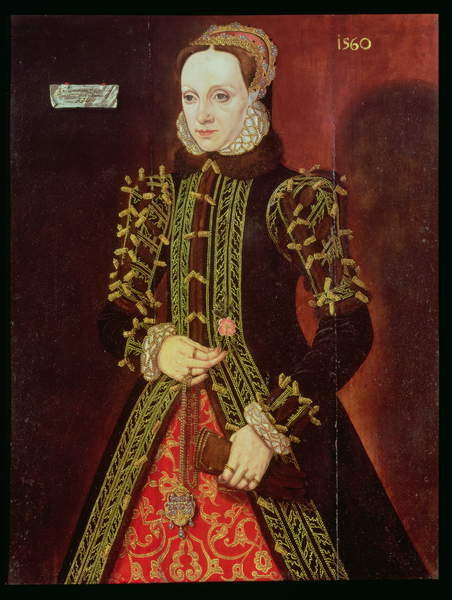
- Portrait of Lady Elizabeth FitzGerald painted by Steven van der Meulen in 1560
- Born: 1527; Maynooth, County Kildare, Ireland
- Died: March 1590 (aged 63); Lincolnshire, England
- Noble family: FitzGerald
- Spouses: Sir Anthony Browne Jr. Edward Clinton, 1st Earl of Lincoln
- Father: Gerald FitzGerald, 9th Earl of Kildare, Lord Deputy of Ireland.
- Mother: Lady Elizabeth Grey
- Occupation: Lady-in-waiting

Elizabeth FitzGerald, Countess of Lincoln (1527 – March 1590), also known as "The Fair Geraldine", was an Irish noblewoman and a member of the celebrated FitzGerald dynasty. She became the second wife of Sir Anthony Browne and later the third wife of English admiral Edward Clinton, 1st Earl of Lincoln. She was the inspiration for The Geraldine, a sonnet written by Henry Howard, Earl of Surrey.

Queen Elizabeth I, whom Lady Elizabeth served as a lady-in-waiting, was her close friend.

== Family and early years ==
Lady Elizabeth FitzGerald was born in Maynooth, County Kildare, Leinster, Ireland, a daughter of Gerald "Gearóid Óg" FitzGerald, 9th Earl of Kildare, Lord Deputy of Ireland, and his second wife, Lady Elizabeth Grey, member of the House of Grey, the daughter of Thomas Grey, 1st Marquess of Dorset and Cecily Bonville. Her half-brother was Thomas "Silken Thomas" FitzGerald. Her paternal grandparents were Gerald Garret Mor FitzGerald, 8th Earl of Kildare and Alison FitzEustace, and her maternal grandparents were Thomas Grey, 1st Marquis of Dorset and Cecily Bonville. Her maternal great-grandmother was Queen Elizabeth Woodville.

Lady Elizabeth was brought up at the Court of King Henry VIII as a companion to the infant Princess Elizabeth Tudor. She first arrived with her mother and one of her sisters in October 1533. In 1534, her father, who was imprisoned in the Tower of London on corruption charges, died on 12 December. In 1537, at the age of ten, she became immortalized by the poet Henry Howard, Earl of Surrey as "The Fair Geraldine" in his sonnet The Geraldine.

The poet was said to have been captivated by her childish beauty, and composed it while he was briefly imprisoned for striking a courtier. There is no truth to the rumour that they were lovers as she was only ten years old at the time. Henry Howard's biographer, Jessie Childs, suggests that Surrey's purpose in writing the sonnet was to improve her opportunities of making a good marriage by praising not only her noble ancestry, but also her beauty and virtues.

Her younger brothers were raised alongside Prince Edward Tudor, who would later become King Edward VI of England. She was sent to the household of Princess Mary Tudor at Hunsdon following the execution of her half-brother, "Silken Thomas", and her five uncles for treason. Her eldest brother, Gerald FitzGerald, 11th Earl of Kildare, had escaped to Ireland. In Donegal, Gerald along with his aunt Lady Eleanor, the new wife of Manus O'Donnell, along with other powerful Irish clans who were related to the FitzGeralds by marriage, formed the Geraldine League. When that federation was defeated in the Battle of Belahoe in Monaghan, he sought refuge on the Continent. He returned to England during the reign of King Edward VI, where he was welcomed at Court and his confiscated lands were returned to him.

== Marriages ==
In 1543, at the age of sixteen, Lady Elizabeth married 60 year old Sir Anthony Browne KG, following the death of his first wife, Alice Gage. The wedding was attended by her cousins King Henry VIII and his daughter Mary. Lady Elizabeth became stepmother to Browne's eight children, who included Anthony Browne, 1st Viscount Montagu, and Mabel Browne, who would later marry Lady Elizabeth's brother, Gerald FitzGerald, also known as "The Wizard Earl". The Brownes were staunchly Roman Catholic.

On 6 May 1548, Sir Anthony Browne died, leaving Lady Elizabeth a widow at the age of twenty-one. She had two sons by Sir Anthony, but they both died young. On 1 October 1552, she married her second husband, Lord High Admiral Edward Clinton, at Sempringham, Kesteven, Lincolnshire. She was his third wife and the couple had no children. Clinton was Lord-Lieutenant of Lincolnshire and Nottinghamshire. He was also a Privy Counsellor. He was created 1st Earl of Lincoln in 1572 and served as Ambassador to France.

== Friendship with Queen Elizabeth ==
Lady Elizabeth was a close intimate of Queen Elizabeth I. She had been a companion to the Queen when the latter was a baby; their friendship was later renewed in the household of the widowed Queen Consort, Catherine Parr, and her fourth husband, Thomas Seymour, where Lady Elizabeth went to live following Sir Anthony's death. They reportedly got on well together in the brief period they both resided at Chelsea Manor.

In 1553, she and her second husband supported the plot to place Lady Jane Grey on the throne in lieu of Princess Mary Tudor; Lady Jane also had been a member of Catherine Parr's household, so it is possible that Lady Elizabeth had developed a fondness for the young girl, which may have prompted her to back Jane's claim. When the plot fails, Lady Elizabeth and her husband manage to regain the trust of Princess Mary, who subsequently becomes queen. Shortly after the ascension of Queen Elizabeth I to the throne, following Queen Mary's death in 1558, Lady Elizabeth was at court as one of the Queen's ladies-in-waiting. Elizabeth was one of those who, in 1561, had tried to warn Lady Katherine Grey to confess her clandestine marriage to Edward Seymour to the Queen before the latter discovered the truth from other people. That same year, Lady Elizabeth fell briefly into disfavour with the Queen and was accused of "frailty" and "forgetfulness of duty". These charges were made by the Archbishop of Canterbury Matthew Parker who also declared that she should be "chastised in Bridewell" for her "offences". Tudor historian David Starkey concludes that Archbishop Parker considered Lady Elizabeth to have been a "strumpet".

Lady Elizabeth afterwards regained her former favour with the Queen.

Several years later, in 1569, Lady Elizabeth exercised her husband's rights as Lord High Admiral to seize a ship which had been illegally taken by Martin Frobisher. Frobisher was arrested for piracy and she was allowed to keep both the ship and its cargo.

== Death ==
On an unknown date in March 1590, Elizabeth FitzGerald died at Lincoln in Lincolnshire, England. She is buried in St. George's Chapel, Windsor Castle. She had no children by her last husband.

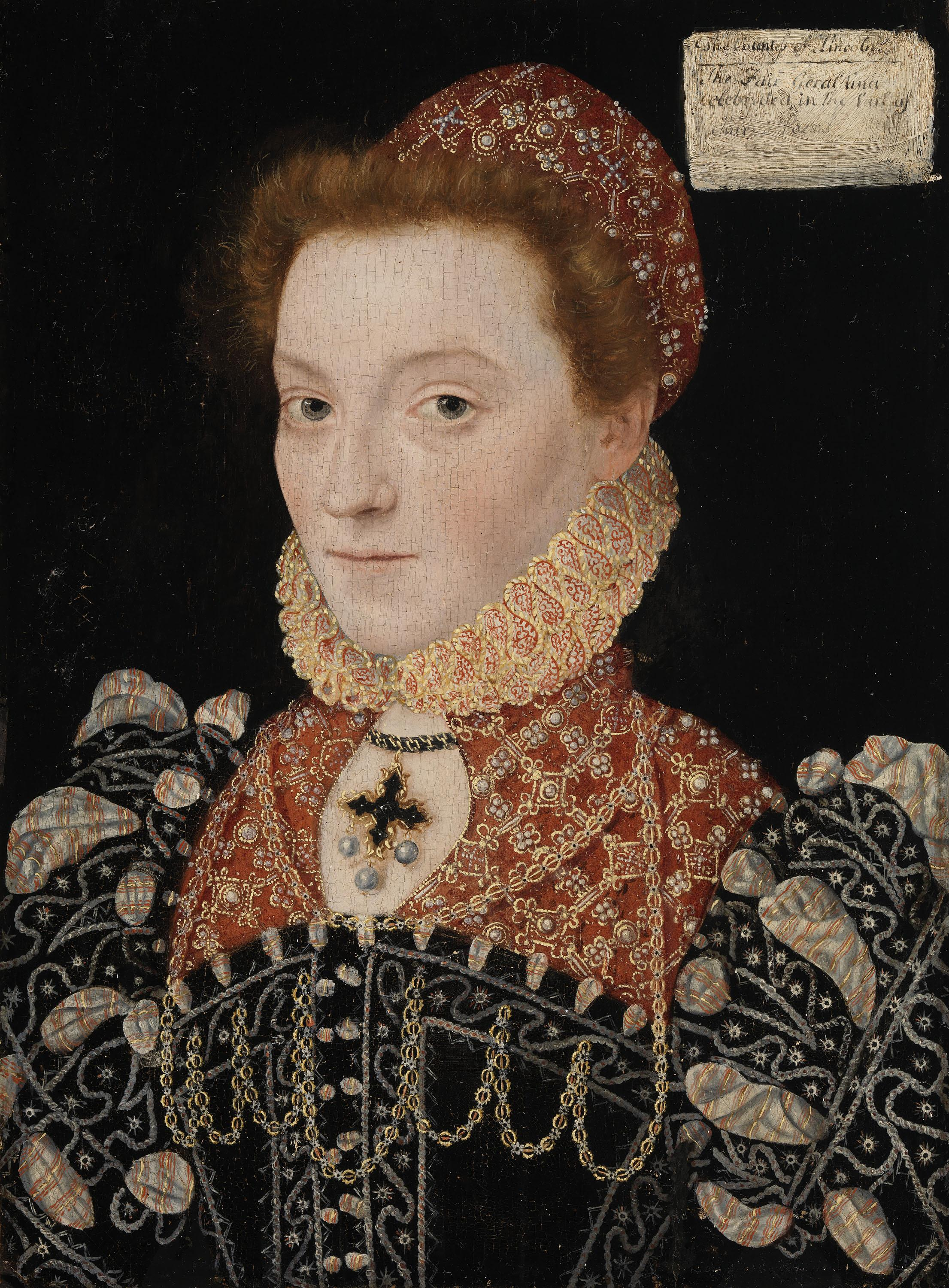
Portrait of Elizabeth FitzGerald, painted by an unknown artist, c.1575. It is displayed in the National Gallery of Ireland

== List of siblings ==
By her father's first marriage to Elizabeth Zouche (died 6 October 1517), Elizabeth's half-siblings included:

- Lord Thomas FitzGerald, 10th Earl of Kildare, also known as "Silken Thomas" (1513 – 3 February 1537). Married Frances Fortescue. He was hanged, drawn, and quartered, along with his five uncles at Tyburn for treason and rebellion.
- Lady Mary FitzGerald (died c. 1596), married Brian Mac Cathaoir O'Connor, King of Uì Failghe, by whom she had nine sons and two daughters.
- Lady Katherine FitzGerald, married Jenico Preston, 3rd Viscount Gormanston, by whom she had eight children.
- Lady Alice FitzGerald (1508 – May 1540), married James Fleming, 9th Baron Slane.

By her father's second marriage to her mother Elizabeth Grey (c. 1497 – after 1548), Elizabeth's siblings included:

- Lord Gerald FitzGerald, 11th Earl of Kildare, known as "The Wizard Earl" (25 February 1525 – 16 November 1585). Married 28 May 1554, Mabel Browne. They had five children. Mabel was Lady Elizabeth's stepdaughter by her first marriage to Sir Anthony Browne.
- Lord Edward FitzGerald (born 1528). Married Agnes Leigh. They had two sons, including Gerald FitzGerald, 14th Earl of Kildare (1612–1660), and a grandson George FitzGerald, 16th Earl of Kildare.
- Lady Margaret FitzGerald. Deaf and dumb; unmarried; chief mourner at her sister Elizabeth's funeral.
- Lady Cecily FitzGerald.

== Ancestry ==
Ancestors of Elizabeth FitzGerald, Countess of Lincoln

16. John FitzGerald, de jure 6th Earl of Kildare
8. Thomas FitzGerald, 7th Earl of Kildare
17. Rose Basset
4. Gerald Fitzgerald, 8th Earl of Kildare
18. James FitzGerald, 6th Earl of Desmond
9. Lady Joan Fitzgerald
19. Mary de Burgh
2. Gerald FitzGerald, 9th Earl of Kildare
20.
10. Rowland FitzEustace, 1st Baron Portlester
21.
5. Alice FitzEustace
22.
11.
23.
1. Lady Elizabeth Fitzgerald
24. Edward Grey
12. John Grey of Groby
25. Elizabeth Ferrers
6. Thomas Grey, 1st Marquess of Dorset
26. Richard Woodville, 1st Earl Rivers
13. Elizabeth Woodville
27. Jacquetta of Luxembourg
3. Lady Elizabeth Grey
28. William Bonville
14. William Bonville, 6th Baron Harington
29. Elizabeth Harington
7. Cecily Bonville, 7th Baroness Harington
30. Richard Neville, 5th Earl of Salisbury
15. Lady Katherine Neville
31. Alice Montacute, 5th Countess of Salisbury

== Depictions in art and literature ==
Elizabeth's portrait was painted in 1560 by Steven van der Meulen, and was in the Lumley Collection. It is currently on display at Agecroft Hall, in Richmond, VA. Another portrait, which can be viewed in the National Gallery of Ireland, was painted in about 1575 by an unknown artist.

Meredith Hamner dedicates his translation of Eusebius' "Ancient Ecclesiastical Histories" (1577) to her.

She is a minor character in Anya Seton's historical romance Green Darkness, which was partially set in mid-16th century England.

She is a minor character in the historical novel The Autobiography of Henry VIII by Margaret George

She was also the subject of Karen Harper's historical fiction novel "The Irish Princess" (2011).

== Depictions in film and television ==
- Elizabeth is played by Irish actress Gemma-Leah Devereux in the fourth and final season of the television series The Tudors, in which she is depicted as a lady-in-waiting to Catherine Howard.

== Sources ==
1. Biographical Dictionary of English Literature
2. James Graves. A Brief Memoir of Lady Elizabeth Fitzgerald
