= Leonard Grey, 1st Viscount Grane =

Lord Deputy of Ireland

The Right Honourable Leonard Grey Lord Deputy of Ireland

Lord Deputy of Ireland

Viscount Grane (created 1536, not assumed)
- In office 1536–1540
- Monarch: Henry VIII
- Preceded by: William Skeffington
- Succeeded by: Anthony St Leger

Personal details
- Born: c. 1479 or 1492
- Died: 28 July 1541 Tower of London, England
- Spouse(s): Elizabeth Arundell; Eleanor Sutton
- Parents: Thomas Grey, 1st Marquess of Dorset (father); Cecily Bonville (mother)
- Known for: Carrigogunnell massacre, Tudor conquest of Ireland

Leonard Grey, Lord Deputy of Ireland (1479/1492 – 28 July 1541), known as Lord Leonard Grey prior to 1536, served as Lord Deputy of Ireland from 1536 to 1540.

== Family ==
Leonard Grey was a younger son of Thomas Grey, 1st Marquess of Dorset and Cecily Bonville, Baroness Harington and Bonville.

== Career ==
On receiving instructions from King Henry VIII, Grey commanded an army which he led in 1535 against Irish rebels who would not acknowledge Henry's supremacy as supreme head of the Church of England, and renounce the Pope. He was said to have been so cruel that he shortened the life of the Lord Deputy of Ireland, William Skeffington, and succeeded him as Lord Deputy. Grey was created Viscount Grane in the Peerage of Ireland on 2 January 1536, but never assumed the title.

He was active in marching against the rebels and he presided over the parliament of 1536, but he was soon at variance with the powerful family of the Butlers and with some of the privy councillors, including the highly influential John Rawson, 1st Viscount Clontarf.

On 11 July 1537, Grey as Lord Deputy visited Galway. This was the first visit of a King's Deputy to the town, and marked the start of closer relations between the town and the Anglo-Irish administration in Dublin. He was lavishly entertained and stayed for seven days.

Grey was accused of allowing the escape of his sister Elizabeth's son, the young Earl of Kildare to France in 1539, which he strenuously denied, and the quarrel with the Butlers became fiercer than ever.

Grey was nevertheless tried and attainted of high treason, and subsequently executed at the Tower of London on 28 July 1541 by the orders of Henry VIII.

=== Carrigogunnell massacre ===
Grey was implicated in several massacres in Ireland; the most notorious took place at Carrigogunnell Castle in 1536 (then part of Thomond, it would later become part of County Limerick in the Kingdom of Ireland). As an active participant in the Tudor conquest of Ireland, he was one of the figures who brought a new element to Irish warfare, where the killing of non-combatants by Crown forces was seen as acceptable by the establishment.

The killings went beyond usual practice in Ireland; as Grey noted in his own account, there were women and children among those he had killed. It is the very fact that he included this information in his report to London, deeming it a piece of service fit to be recorded, that pinpoints his significance in the military history of sixteenth-century Ireland. Traditionally, Irish warlords only rejoiced in the killing of soldiers, and passed over the killing of non-combatants in silence. Grey (and other English officers of the time) saw all killing as virtuous, an achievement worthy of commemoration.

— David Edwards, Age of Atrocity: Violence and Political Conflict in Early Modern Ireland, 2010.

== Marriages and issue ==
He married twice, but had no children by either wife. He married first, between 18 February 1509/1510 and Easter 1514, Elizabeth (Arundell) Daubeney, widow of Giles, Lord Daubeney, and daughter of John Arundell, of Lanherne, Cornwall by his 2nd wife, Katherine, first daughter and co-heiress of Sir John Chidiock. He m. bef. 27 June 1527 Eleanor Sutton, daughter of Edward Sutton, 2nd Baron Dudley by Cecily Willoughby, daughter and coheiress of Sir William Willoughby and widow of Charles Somerset, Earl of Worcester (1460, 15 March 1526): Leonard Grey presented Thomas Mounteforth as rector of Aldwincle All Saints on 27 June 1527 in right of his wife, Countess of Worcester; She died before 24 May 1532, when Leonard Grey was contemplating marriage with Elizabeth, widow of Gilbert, Lord Tailbois, which marriage did not take place. There is no evidence for additional marriages and he is mentioned in the will of his brother, Sir John Grey.
