= Cecily Bonville, 7th Baroness Harington =

English noblewoman and peeress (1460–1529)

The Right Honourable The Countess of Wiltshire
- suo jure Baroness Harington and Bonville
- Presumed effigy of Cecily Bonville on her tomb in the Church of St. Mary the Virgin, Astley, Warwickshire, drawing of 1890
- Born: 30 June 1460; Shute Manor, Shute, near Axminster, Devon, England
- Died: 12 May 1529 (aged 68); Shacklewell, Hackney, Middlesex
- Buried: Collegiate Church of St. Mary the Virgin, Astley, Warwickshire
- Noble family: Bonville; Neville
- Spouses: Thomas Grey, 1st Marquess of Dorset (m. 1474; died 1501) Henry Stafford, 1st Earl of Wiltshire (m. 1503; died 1523)
- Issue: Thomas Grey, 2nd Marquess of Dorset; Leonard Grey, 1st Viscount Grane; Dorothy Grey, Baroness Mountjoy; Mary Grey, Viscountess Hereford; Elizabeth Grey, Countess of Kildare; Cecily Grey, Baroness Dudley; Edward Grey; Eleanor Grey; Margaret Grey; Anthony Grey; Bridget Grey; George Grey; Richard Grey; John Grey
- Father: William Bonville, 6th Baron Harington
- Mother: Katherine Neville

Cecily Bonville, 7th Baroness Harington, 2nd Baroness Bonville (30 June 1460 – 12 May 1529) was an English peer, who was also Marchioness of Dorset by her first marriage to Thomas Grey, 1st Marquess of Dorset, and Countess of Wiltshire by her second marriage to Henry Stafford, 1st Earl of Wiltshire.

The Bonvilles were loyal supporters of the House of York during the series of dynastic civil wars that were fought for the English throne, known as the Wars of the Roses (1455–1487). When she was less than a year old, Cecily became the wealthiest heiress in England after her male relatives were slain in battle, fighting against the House of Lancaster.

Cecily's life after the death of her first husband in 1501 was marked by an acrimonious dispute with her son and heir, Thomas Grey, 2nd Marquess of Dorset. This was over Cecily's right to remain sole executor of her late husband's estate and to control her own inheritance, both of which Thomas challenged following her second marriage to Henry Stafford; a man many years her junior. Their quarrel required the intervention of King Henry VII and the royal council.

Lady Jane Grey, Lady Catherine Grey and Lady Mary Grey were her great-granddaughters. All three were in the line of succession to the English throne. Jane, the eldest, reigned as queen for nine days in July 1553.

== Bonville inheritance ==
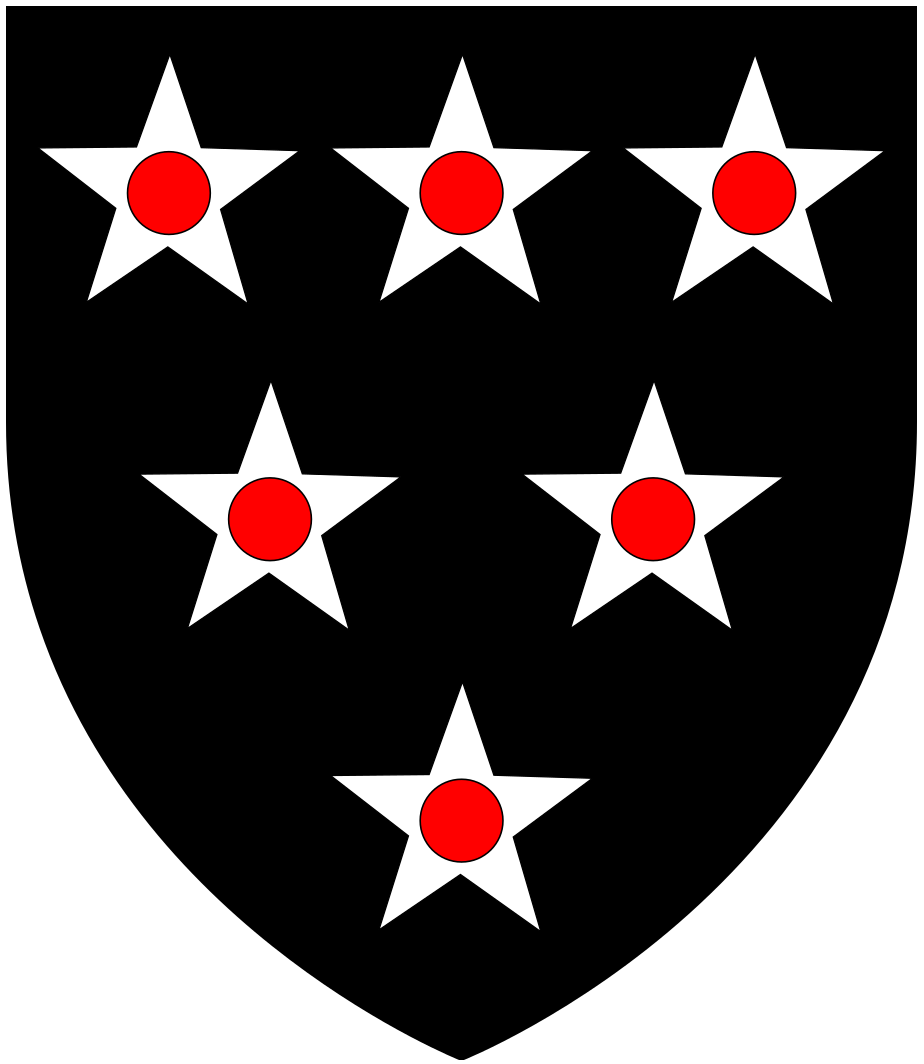
Arms of Bonville: Sable, six mullets argent pierced gules

Cecily Bonville was born on or about 30 June 1460 at Shute Manor in Shute near Axminster, Devon, England. She was the only child and heiress of William Bonville, 6th Baron Harington of Aldingham, and Lady Katherine Neville, a younger sister of the military commander Richard Neville, 16th Earl of Warwick, known to history as "Warwick the Kingmaker". Her family had acquired the Barony of Harington through the marriage of her paternal grandfather William Bonville to Elizabeth Harington, daughter and heiress of William Harington, 5th Baron Harington of Aldingham.

When Cecily was just six months old, both her father, Lord Harington, and grandfather, William Bonville, were executed following the disastrous Battle of Wakefield on 30 December 1460. The Bonvilles, having fought with the Yorkist contingent, were shown no mercy from the victorious troops of Margaret of Anjou (wife of King Henry VI of England), who headed the Lancastrian faction, and were thus swiftly decapitated on the battlefield. Cecily's maternal grandfather, Richard Neville, 5th Earl of Salisbury, was also executed after the battle which had been commanded on the Lancastrian side by Henry Beaufort, 3rd Duke of Somerset, while Richard Plantagenet, Duke of York, had led the Yorkists and was consequently slain in the fighting. Margaret of Anjou, Queen of England, was in Scotland at the time raising support for her cause and so had not been present at Wakefield. In less than two months, the Yorkists suffered another major defeat at the Second Battle of St Albans on 17 February 1461, and the Lancastrian army's commander Margaret of Anjou, in an act of vengeance, personally ordered the execution of Cecily's great-grandfather, William Bonville, 1st Baron Bonville, the next day. These executions left Cecily Bonville as the wealthiest heiress in England, having inherited numerous estates in the West Country, as well as manors in Lancashire, Lincolnshire, Yorkshire, and Cumberland. She succeeded to the title of suo jure 7th Baroness Harington of Aldingham on 30 December 1460, and the title of suo jure 2nd Baroness Bonville on 18 February 1461.

== Stepfather ==
Her mother remarried shortly before 6 February 1462. Cecily's stepfather was William Hastings, 1st Baron Hastings, one of the most powerful men in England, serving as Lord Chamberlain and a personal advisor to her first cousin once removed, (Note: Cecily's maternal grandfather and Edward IV's mother, Cecily Neville were siblings) King Edward IV, who by that time sat upon the English throne, having been proclaimed king in London on 4 March 1461. Edward had strengthened his claim with the resounding Yorkist victory on 29 March at the Battle of Towton where he as overall commander of the Yorkist army had overwhelmingly defeated the Lancastrians who suffered heavy losses including the deaths of two of their commanders Henry Percy, 3rd Earl of Northumberland and Sir Andrew Trollope.

In addition to her own dowry, Katherine brought the wardship of Cecily to her new husband.

By her mother's marriage to Lord Hastings, Cecily would acquire three surviving half-brothers: Edward Hastings, 2nd Baron Hastings, who married Mary Hungerford, Baroness Botreaux; Richard Hastings; and William Hastings, who married Jane Sheffield. In addition, there was a half-sister, Anne Hastings, who married George Talbot, 4th Earl of Shrewsbury.

== First marriage ==
Cecily was considered as a possible marriage candidate for William, the eldest son and heir of the Earl of Pembroke, who approached her influential uncle the Earl of Warwick with his proposal in about 1468. Warwick turned his offer down, as he considered the Earl's son to have been lacking in sufficient noble birth and prestige to marry a member of his family. About six years later, another spouse was found for Cecily; however, Warwick, who by then was dead (he was slain at the Battle of Barnet in 1471 by the forces of King Edward having two years earlier switched his loyalties to the Lancastrians), had had nothing to do with the bridegroom that was chosen for her.

She married Thomas Grey, 1st Marquess of Dorset, on 18 July 1474, just over two weeks after her fourteenth birthday. He was the eldest son of King Edward's queen consort, Elizabeth Woodville, by her first husband, Sir John Grey of Groby (a Lancastrian knight who had been killed in combat at the Second Battle of St Albans, the site of Cecily's great-grandfather's execution). It was Thomas's second marriage. His first wife, whom he had married in October 1466, was Anne Holland, the only daughter and heiress of Henry Holland, 3rd Duke of Exeter, and Anne of York. Anne Holland had died childless sometime between 26 August 1467 and 6 June 1474. Cecily's marriage had been proposed and arranged by Queen Elizabeth Woodville, who, with assistance from King Edward, persuaded Cecily's stepfather and legal guardian, Baron Hastings, to agree to the marriage, despite the latter's dislike of Thomas and the opposition of her mother, Lady Hastings, to the match. The Queen had that same year bought Cecily's wardship from Hastings to facilitate the marriage. The marriage accord stipulated that, were Thomas to die prior to the consummation of the marriage, Cecily would then marry his younger brother Sir Richard Grey. (Note: Church Law forbade a man to marry the widow of his dead brother, but only if the union had been consummated. Fifty years later, when Henry VIII applied to the Pope seeking an annulment from Catherine of Aragon in order to marry Anne Boleyn, he would use this very law, which was written in the Book of Leviticus, to insist that his marriage to Catherine had been invalid from the beginning.) This accord was confirmed by an Act of Parliament. The marriage had cost Elizabeth Woodville the sum of £2,500. She in turn, held on to Cecily's inheritance until the latter turned 16 years old. Cecily Bonville and Thomas Grey shared a common ancestor in the person of Reginald Grey, 3rd Baron Grey de Ruthyn, who married twice; firstly to Margaret de Ros, and secondly to Joan de Astley. At the time of Cecily's marriage to Thomas, the latter held the title of Earl of Huntingdon; he resigned this peerage a year later in 1475, when he was created Marquess of Dorset. Being that women were not permitted to sit in Parliament, Thomas sat in Cecily's place as Baron Harington and Bonville.

Cecily's husband, a notorious womaniser, shared the same mistress, Jane Shore, with his stepfather, King Edward. When the King died in April 1483, Jane then became the mistress of Cecily's stepfather, Baron Hastings. This new situation only deepened the sour relations between Hastings and Thomas. Together with his mother, Thomas attempted to seize power immediately following the King's death, as the new king, Edward V, was a minor of 12. Thomas had stolen part of the royal treasure from the Tower of London, dividing it between his mother and uncle Sir Edward Woodville, who used his portion to equip a fleet of ships at Thomas's instigation; ostensibly to patrol the English coasts against French pirates, but in fact it was a Woodville fleet to be used against their enemies within England. Jane Shore was instrumental in Hastings's defection from the side of King Edward's youngest brother, Richard, Duke of Gloucester, who had been made Lord Protector of the realm by the will of Edward IV. In this position of authority, Richard had gathered a force of friends, local gentry and retainers, headed south in an armed cavalcade from his Yorkshire stronghold of Middleham Castle to take into protective custody and separate the young king from the Woodvilles, putting a prompt end to their ambitions and long dominion at court. Jane persuaded Hastings to join the Woodville family in a conspiracy aimed at removing the Lord Protector; and when Richard was apprised of Hastings's treachery, he ordered his immediate execution on 13 June 1483 at the Tower of London. Hastings was not attainted, however, and Cecily's mother was placed under Richard's protection.

Thomas's maternal uncle Anthony Woodville, Earl Rivers, and his younger full brother Richard Grey were both executed on 25 June 1483 by the orders of the former Lord Protector King Richard III, who had three days earlier claimed the crown of England for himself. Richard's claim was supported by an Act of Parliament known as Titulus Regius which declared Thomas's half-brother the uncrowned King Edward V and his siblings illegitimate. Although Thomas and Cecily attended Richard's coronation, later that year, Thomas joined the rebellion of Henry Stafford, 2nd Duke of Buckingham, against the king. When this revolt failed and Buckingham subsequently executed, he left Cecily behind in England and escaped to Brittany. There he became an adherent of Henry Tudor, who would ascend the English throne as Henry VII following his success at the Battle of Bosworth on 22 August 1485. During the time Thomas remained abroad in the service of Henry Tudor, King Richard ensured that Cecily and the other rebels' wives were not molested, nor their personal property rights tampered with. King Richard would be slain at Bosworth by the Lancastrian forces of Henry, ushering in the Tudor dynasty. Thomas, however, had played no part in Henry Tudor's invasion of England, or the subsequent battle, having been confined in Paris as security for the repayment of a French loan to Henry. In 1484, Thomas had switched his allegiance back to King Richard after learning his mother had come to terms with him. He had been on his way home to England to make his peace with Richard when he was intercepted at Compiègne by Henry Tudor's emissaries and compelled to remain in France.

Notwithstanding her Yorkist family background and her husband's desertion of the Tudor cause in support of King Richard, she and Thomas (since returned to England) were both guests at King Henry VII's's coronation. The following month, the new king lifted the attainder which had been placed on Thomas in January 1484 by Richard III for his participation in the Duke of Buckingham's unsuccessful rebellion. The Dorsets also attended the wedding of Henry and Elizabeth of York in January 1486. Elizabeth was Thomas's eldest uterine half-sister by his mother's second marriage to King Edward. When she was crowned Queen consort in November 1487, Cecily and Thomas were present inside Westminster Abbey to witness the ceremony. Cecily had been honoured the preceding year on the occasion of Prince Arthur's baptism, when she was chosen to carry the boy's train while her mother-in-law, the dowager queen, stood as the Prince's sponsor. The ceremony had taken place at Winchester Cathedral.

Thomas and Cecily together had a total of fourteen children, eleven of whom survived to adulthood. The birth of her eldest son, Thomas, was noted in a letter from John Paston II to John Paston III in June 1477: Tydyngys, butt that yisterdaye my lady Marqueys off Dorset whyche is my Lady Hastyngys dowtre, hadd chylde a sone.

=== Children ===
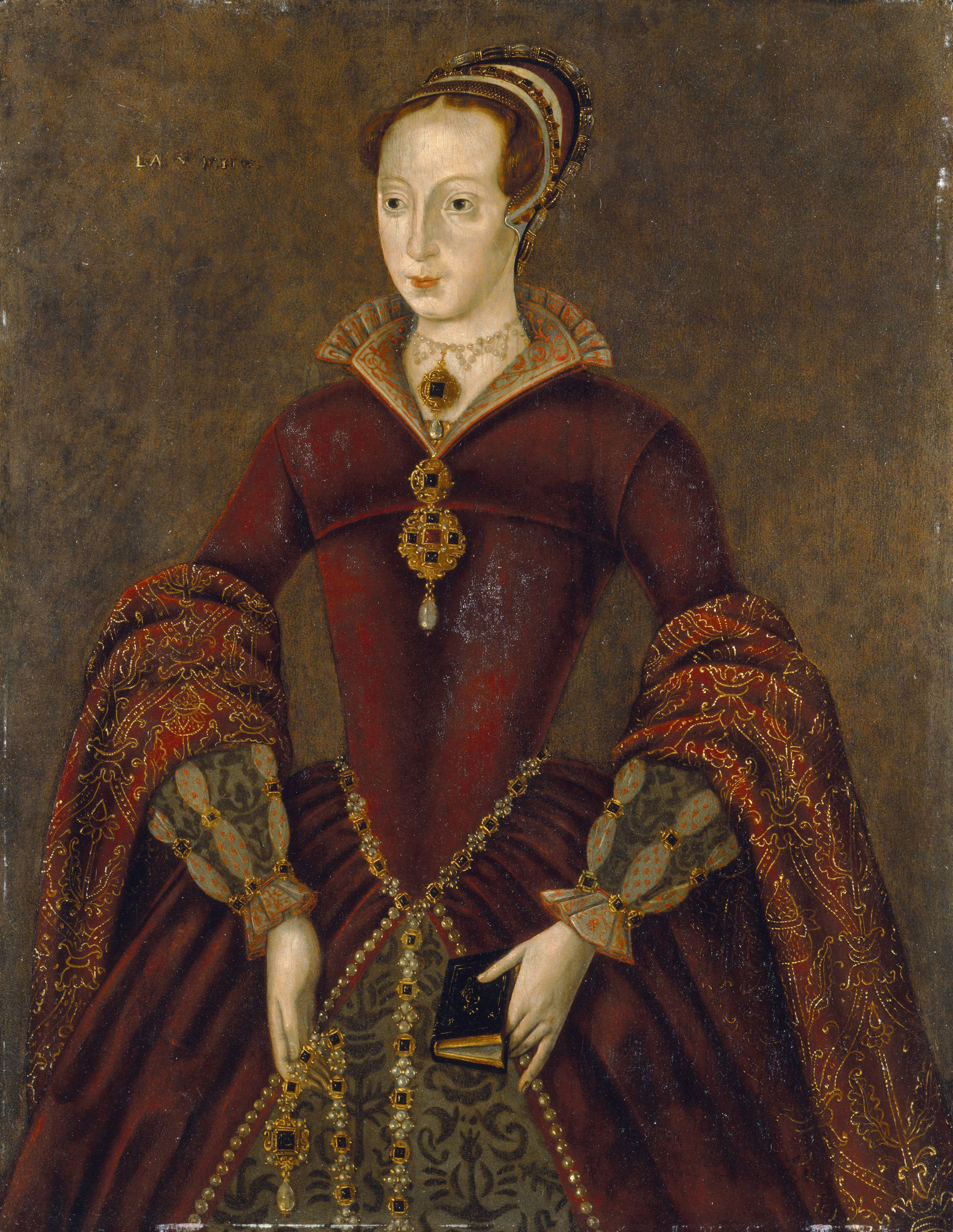
Lady Jane Grey was the great-granddaughter of Cecily Bonville and her first husband, Thomas Grey, 1st Marquess of Dorset

- Thomas Grey, 2nd Marquess of Dorset (22 June 1477 – 10 Oct 1530); married Margaret Wotton, by whom he had issue, including Henry Grey, 1st Duke of Suffolk. Henry, in his turn, married Lady Frances Brandon, the daughter of Mary Tudor, Queen of France. Henry Grey and Frances Brandon were the parents of Lady Jane Grey, Lady Catherine Grey, and Lady Mary Grey.
- Leonard Grey, 1st Viscount Grane (c.1478 – 28 July 1541) Lord Deputy of Ireland; married Eleanor Sutton. He was attainted and executed at the Tower of London for High Treason by the orders of King Henry VIII.
- Dorothy Anne Grey (1480–1552); married firstly Robert Willoughby, 2nd Baron Willoughby de Broke, by whom she had issue, and secondly, William Blount, 4th Baron Mountjoy, by whom she had issue.
- Mary Grey (1491 – 22 February 1538); married 15 December 1503 Walter Devereux, 1st Viscount Hereford, by whom she had three sons, including Sir Richard Devereaux, who was the grandfather of Robert Devereux, 2nd Earl of Essex, and Penelope Devereux.
- Elizabeth Grey (c.1497 – after 1548); Maid of Honour to Mary Tudor, Queen of France and the latter's successor, Queen Claude of France; married in about 1522 Gerald FitzGerald, 9th Earl of Kildare, by whom she had issue, including Lady Elizabeth FitzGerald, also known as "The Fair Geraldine", and Gerald FitzGerald, 11th Earl of Kildare.
- Cecily Grey (c.1497-1554); married John Sutton, 3rd Baron Dudley, by whom she had issue.
- Edward Grey; married Anne Jerningham.
- Eleanor Grey; married John Arundell (1474–1545), by whom she had issue.
- Margaret Grey; married Richard Wake, Esq.
- Anthony Grey; died young.
- Bridget Grey; died young.
- George Grey; entered clerical orders; nothing further is known about him.
- Richard Grey; married Florence Pudney.
- John Grey; died young.

== Later years ==
=== The "Dorset Aisle" ===
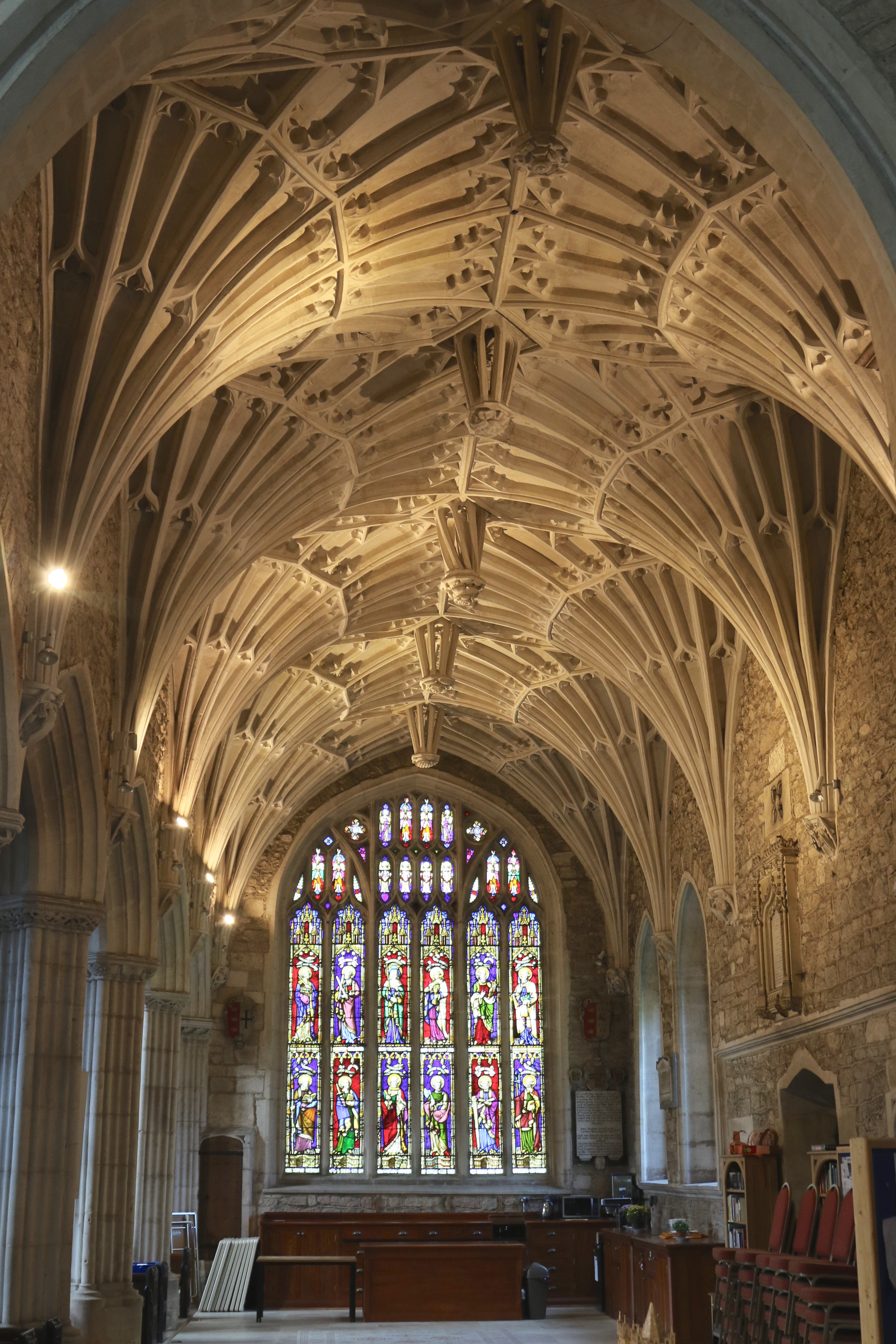
Fan vaulted ceiling of the north aisle ("Dorset Aisle") of Ottery St Mary Church, built by Cecily Bonville, Marchioness of Dorset. She also built the North Porch which displays sculpted Stafford Knots, a heraldic badge of her second husband

In the 1490s Cecily added a magnificent fan vaulted north aisle, which she had personally designed, to the Church of Ottery St Mary in Devon. One of the many estates she had inherited from her father was the nearby manor of Knightstone within the parish. This north aisle is therefore known as the "Dorset Aisle". As Cecily had been present at the inauguration of the St George's Chapel at Windsor Castle in 1476, she was inspired by its construction to later design the north aisle at Ottery St Mary in a similar style. Her coat-of-arms, a figure of St. Cecilia, and carved heraldic devices and badges are displayed throughout the aisle representing her own lineage as well as that of her two spouses. She also made several additions to other churches situated within the locality of her vast West Country holdings; however, none were executed as splendidly, and with such meticulous attention to detail as the Dorset Aisle.

Upon the death of Thomas Grey in September 1501, Cecily's eldest son Thomas inherited his title and some of his estates, however Cecily kept the greater portion of his lands and properties. Cecily was also named as one of her mother's executors in the latter's will, which was written shortly before her death in 1504.

=== Dispute with her son ===
She married a second time in 1503 on her Feast Day of 22 November, Henry Stafford, 1st Earl of Wiltshire; however, this marriage did not produce any children. As the marriage had required a papal dispensation and the King's licence, Stafford paid Henry VII the sum of £2,000 for the necessary permission to marry Cecily, who at 43 years old was 19 years older than her spouse. Her son Thomas, the 2nd Marquess of Dorset vehemently disapproved of the match, as it is alleged he feared she would use her inheritance to "endow her new husband at his own expense". His fears did have some foundation as Cecily gave Stafford a life estate in holdings valued at £1,000 per year and even vowed to leave him the remainder of her capital should Thomas happen to predecease her. This provoked Thomas to challenge Cecily's right to continue as his father's sole executor, resulting in an acrimonious dispute that necessitated the intervention of King Henry VII and his council to stop it from escalating even further. The settlement the King decreed allowed Cecily to manage her late husband's estate until she had paid off his debts, but prevented her from claiming her dower until she had transferred the remainder of her son's inheritance to him. King Henry's arbitrary decision also severely limited her control over her own inheritance: she was required to bequeath all of it to Thomas upon her death; until then, Cecily was permitted to grant lands worth up to 1,000 marks per annum for a certain number of years. Historian Barbara Jean Harris stated that the Crown's oppressive decree greatly restricted Cecily's personal rights as an heiress in favour of those of her eldest son and the tradition of primogeniture.

Twenty years later, Cecily and her son Thomas quarrelled again; on this occasion it was about their mutual duties towards Thomas's seven surviving siblings. Cardinal Thomas Wolsey arbitrated on behalf of King Henry VIII and ordered both Cecily and Thomas to contribute to the dowries of her four living daughters: the ladies Dorothy, Mary, Elizabeth, and Cecily. She was also forced to create individual annuities drawn from her own funds for her three younger sons. In 1527 she gave her daughter Elizabeth an additional dowry of £1000 although her marriage to the Earl of Kildare had gone against the wishes of both Cecily and her first husband. She added the following explanation for the gift of money despite having had earlier misgivings: "Forasmuch as the said marriage is honourable and I and all her friends have cause to be content with the same".

=== Will ===
Cecily wrote a letter to Thomas Cromwell from Bedwell, asking him to send her a bed of cloth of tissue and its counterpoint, and to send her "tents, pavylyons, and hales" to her son Leonard. She signed and dated the letter "Cecyl Dorsett" on Lady Day, without adding the year.

Cecily made her last will on 6 May 1527, giving her name as "Cecill Marquess of Dorset, Lady Haryngton and Bonvyll, late wife of Thomas Marquess of Dorset".

=== Death and legacy ===
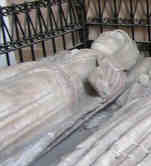
Presumed, partially damaged effigy of Cecily Bonville on her tomb in the Church of St. Mary the Virgin, Astley, Warwickshire

During her lifetime, Cecily expanded Shute Manor from a medieval country house into a grand Tudor residence. The late years of her life were spent at Astley Castle in Astley, Warwickshire, the family seat of the Grey family.

Cecily died during an outbreak of the sweating sickness on 12 May 1529 at Shacklewell in Hackney, London. She was buried in the Collegiate Church of St. Mary the Virgin, Astley, Warwickshire, where her effigy (which has been damaged), can be seen alongside those of her distant cousin, Sir Edward Grey, Viscount Lisle (d. 1492) and his wife Elizabeth, née Talbot (d. 1487). Cecily is on the far left of the group wearing a pedimental head-dress, a high-cut kirtle, cote-hardie, and mantle, at the corners of which are two small dogs. She was not quite sixty-nine years old at the time of her death. Her second husband had died six years earlier, deeply in debt; these debts, Cecily had been legally obliged to repay. In her will, Cecily had expressed her wish to be buried with her first husband, and had made the necessary provisions for the construction of a "goodly tomb". She also requested for a thousand masses to be said for her soul "in as convenient haste as may be".

Cecily Bonville had many notable descendants, including Lady Jane Grey, Lady Catherine Grey, Elizabeth FitzGerald, Countess of Lincoln, Robert Devereux, 2nd Earl of Essex, Elizabeth Vernon and Frances Howard, Countess of Somerset.

One of Cecily Bonville's West Country estates, Sock Denny Manor in Somerset was farmed for £22 in 1527–28, and again, ten years after her death, in 1539–40, .

In February 1537, her daughter Cecily Sutton wrote to Henry VIII's chief minister, Thomas Cromwell, complaining of the poverty in which she and her husband were forced to live. There is also an extant letter which Cecily Bonville herself had written to Cromwell.

== In fiction ==
Cecily Bonville is the protagonist in The Summer Queen, a historical romance which was written by Alice Walworth Graham and published in 1973. The novel is highly fictitious as it takes many liberties with the known facts of Cecily's life, so it is not to be regarded as a biography.

== Ancestry ==
Ancestors of Cecily Bonville, 7th Baroness Harington

16. John Bonville
8. William Bonville, 1st Baron Bonville
17. Elizabeth FitzRoger
4. William Bonville
18. Reginald Grey, 3rd Baron Grey de Ruthyn
9. Margaret Grey
19. Margaret de Ros
2. William Bonville, 6th Baron Harington
20. Sir Robert Harington, 3rd Baron Harington
10. William Harington, 5th Baron Harington
21. Isabel Loring
5. Elizabeth Harington
22. John Hylle
11. Margaret Hill
23. Dionysie Durborough
1. Cecily Bonville
24. John Neville, 3rd Baron Neville de Raby
12. Ralph de Neville, 1st Earl of Westmorland
25. Maud Percy
6. Richard Neville, 5th Earl of Salisbury
26. John of Gaunt, 1st Duke of Lancaster
13. Joan Beaufort, Countess of Westmoreland
27. Katherine Swynford
3. Lady Katherine Neville
28. John Montacute, 3rd Earl of Salisbury
14. Thomas Montacute, 4th Earl of Salisbury
29. Maud Francis
7. Alice Montacute, 5th Countess of Salisbury
30. Thomas Holland, 2nd Earl of Kent
15. Eleanor Holland
31. Lady Alice FitzAlan

== Bibliography ==
- Bridie, Marion Ferguson (1955). The Story of Shute: the Bonvilles and Poles. Axminster, England: Shute School.
- Fraser, Antonia (1975) The Lives of The Kings and Queens of England. New York: Alfred A. Knopf. ISBN 0-394-49557-4
- Worldroots.com by Leo Van de Pas
- Costain, Thomas Bertram (1962). The Last Plantagenets. Garden City, N.Y.: Doubleday.
- Kendall, Paul Murray (1955). Richard the Third. Allen & Urwin. OCLC 3007470.
- Harris, Barbara Jean (2002). English Aristocratic Women, 1450-1550: Marriage and Family, Property and Careers. Oxford: Oxford University Press.

Peerage of England
Preceded by William Bonville	Baroness Bonville; 1461–1529	Succeeded by Thomas Grey
Preceded by William Bonville	Baroness Harington; 1460–1529	Succeeded by Thomas Grey
