= Henry Stafford, 1st Earl of Wiltshire =

English peer

The Right Honourable The Earl of Wiltshire
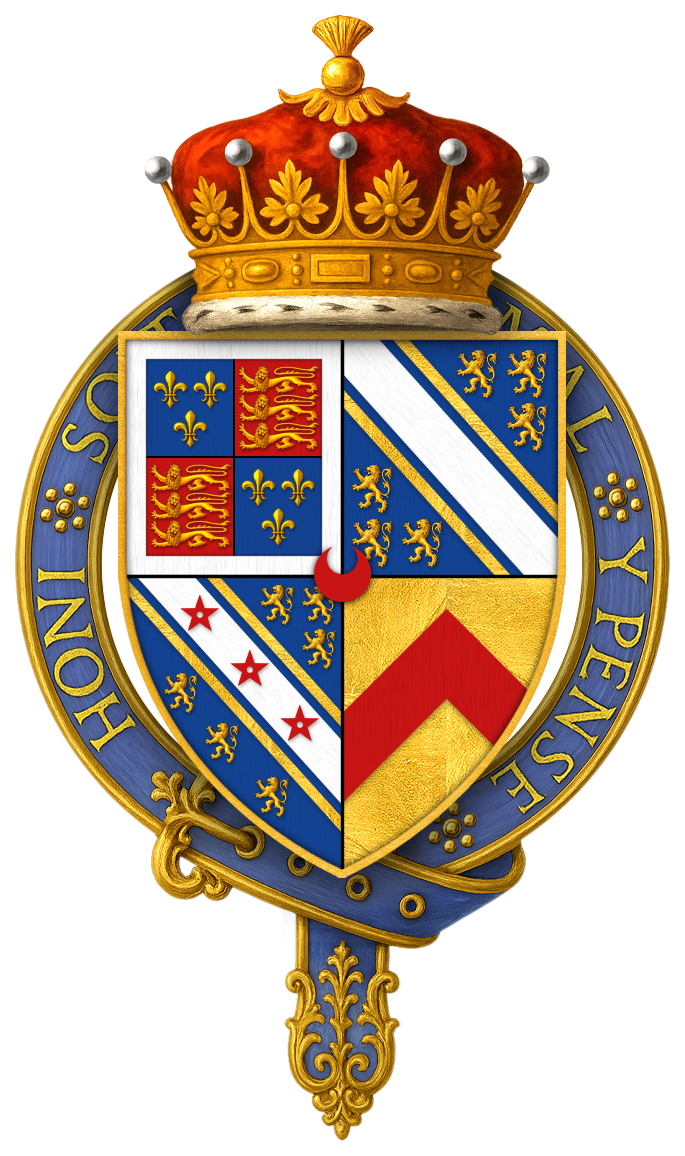
- Arms of Henry Stafford, 1st Earl of Wiltshire, KG
- Born: c. 1479
- Died: 6 April 1523
- Noble family: Stafford
- Spouse: Cecily Bonville, 7th Baroness Harington
- Father: Henry Stafford, 2nd Duke of Buckingham
- Mother: Lady Catherine Woodville

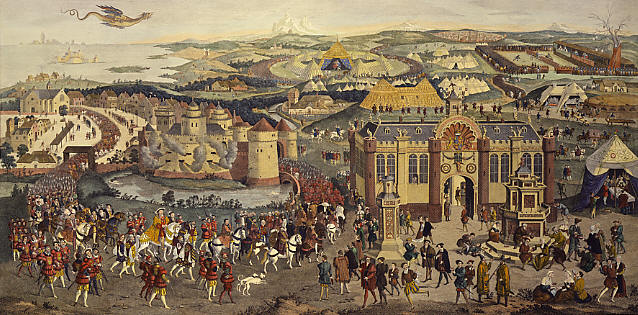
Field of the Cloth of Gold, engraving by James Basire (1774)

Henry Stafford, 1st Earl of Wiltshire KG (c. 1479 – 6 April 1523) was an English peer.

== Family ==
Henry Stafford, born c.1479, was the younger of two sons of Henry Stafford, 2nd Duke of Buckingham, and Lady Catherine Woodville, the daughter of Richard Woodville, 1st Earl Rivers, by Jacquetta of Luxembourg, daughter of Pierre de Luxembourg, Count of St. Pol, and was thus a nephew of Elizabeth Woodville and King Edward IV.

By his father's marriage to Catherine Woodville, Stafford had an elder brother, Edward Stafford, 3rd Duke of Buckingham, and two sisters, Elizabeth, who married Robert Radcliffe, 1st Earl of Sussex, and Anne, who married firstly, Sir Walter Herbert (d. 16 September 1507), an illegitimate son of William Herbert, 1st Earl of Pembroke, and secondly, George Hastings, 1st Earl of Huntingdon.

After the execution of the 2nd Duke of Buckingham, his widow, Catherine Woodville, married Jasper Tudor, second son of Owen Tudor and King Henry V's widow, Catherine of Valois. After Jasper Tudor's death on 21 December 1495, Catherine Woodville married Sir Richard Wingfield (d. 22 July 1525). Catherine Woodville died 18 May 1497. After her death, Sir Richard Wingfield married Bridget Wiltshire, daughter and heiress of Sir John Wiltshire of Stone, Kent.

== Career ==
In October 1483 Stafford's father participated in a rebellion against King Richard III. He was beheaded without trial on 2 November 1483, whereby all his honours were forfeited. However, after Richard III's defeat at Bosworth on 22 August 1485, and King Henry VII's accession to the crown, Stafford's elder brother was made a Knight of the Order of the Bath on 29 October 1485 as Duke of Buckingham, and attended Henry VII's coronation the following day. Their father's attainder was formally reversed by Parliament in November of that year, and the wardship of both Henry Stafford and his elder brother were granted, on 3 August 1486, to the King's mother, Margaret Beaufort. The reversal of the attainder may have been influenced by the fact that Edward and Henry Stafford's mother, Catherine Woodville, was the sister of Elizabeth Woodville, mother of King Henry VII's wife, Elizabeth of York.

Stafford did not inherit properties which would have ensured his financial independence, and according to Dockray his elder brother, the Duke of Buckingham, did not endow him with lands which would have guaranteed him an income. It was thus perhaps for financial reasons that Stafford became one of his brother's retained councillors and assisted with the management of the extensive Stafford estates. In 1500 Stafford oversaw a survey of his brother's properties in the Welsh Marches, Thornbury, and Bedminster, in 1502 he assisted with an audit of his brother's Gloucestershire estates, and from about 1500 to 1521 he served as steward, and for most of that time also as sheriff, of his brother's Welsh lordships.

Stafford also played a role at the courts of Henry VII and Henry VIII. On 22 April 1505 he was made a member of the Order of the Garter, and in January 1506 was present at a meeting between the Henry VII and Philip of Castile at Windsor. At the accession of Henry VIII on 21 April 1509 Stafford was imprisoned in the Tower on suspicion of treason, but was released without charge. On 27 January 1510 he was created Earl of Wiltshire.

According to Dockray, Stafford was thereafter among the King's favoured courtiers, 'sharing his taste for lavish entertainments, tournaments, and hunting'. The King granted Stafford several offices in the West Country, and he served militarily on one of the King's ships in 1512 and as captain of 651 men during Henry VIII's invasion of France in 1513, landing at Calais on 10 June, and marching south-east on 16 June to participate in the siege of Thérouanne.

Stafford was on the commission directed to inquire into riots in Devon on 29 September 1514, and was in attendance in Westminster Abbey when Thomas Wolsey received his Cardinal's hat on 18 November 1515. Either in or before 1520 he became a member of the Privy Council, and in 1520 was appointed to attend the King at the Field of the Cloth of Gold in June, and at his meeting with the Emperor Charles V in July. Dockray notes that Wiltshire's expenditure at court in the early years of the reign of Henry VIII must have been considerable, as by 1521 he owed the crown £4407 4s.

Stafford was under suspicion in the plot which led to the execution of his elder brother on 17 May 1521, being among those on whom the King ordered Wolsey to keep 'good watch', but apparently retained the King's favour, and was with the army which crossed to France on 12 August 1522.

Stafford died a few months later on 6 April 1523, aged about 44. He left no issue, and the earldom became extinct. On 8 December 1529 the title was granted to Thomas Boleyn, whose daughter, Anne, was betrothed to King Henry VIII.

== Marriage and issue ==
According to Burke, p. 493, Stafford married firstly, Margaret Grey, daughter and co-heiress of John Grey, Viscount Lisle, and widow of Edward Stafford, 2nd Earl of Wiltshire (d. 24 March 1499). However Cokayne, Vol. XII, p. 738, states that this alleged marriage did not take place. Moreover, Burke mistakenly identifies Margaret Grey as the daughter of John Grey, Viscount Lisle, whereas she was the daughter of Edward Grey, Viscount Lisle, and his wife, Elizabeth Talbot (d. 8 September 1487), and the sister of John Grey (d. 6 or 9 September 1509), 4th Viscount Lisle. Pidgeon states that in the supplication he made to obtain a dispensation to marry Cicely Bonville he is described as a widower although "there is no other evidence for a wife."

Before 8 October 1505 Stafford paid Henry VII £2000 for permission to marry the wealthy Cecily Bonville, only child and heiress of William Bonville, 6th Baron Harington, and widow of Henry Stafford's first cousin, Thomas Grey, 1st Marquess of Dorset (c.1455 – 30 August 1501). Cecily Bonville was some nineteen years older than Stafford, and had seven sons and seven daughters by her first marriage. The proposed match prompted Cecily's eldest son, Thomas Grey, 2nd Marquess of Dorset, to challenge his mother's right to continue as her late husband's executor. After intervention by King and council, a settlement was reached under which Cecily was prevented from claiming her dower until her eldest son had received his inheritance under his father's will, and limited her control over her own inheritance during her lifetime, requiring her to bequeath it to her eldest son at her death.

== Footnotes ==
Peerage of England
New creation	Earl of Wiltshire; 1510–1523	Extinct
