= Thomas Grey, 2nd Marquess of Dorset =

English peer, courtier, soldier and landowner (1477–1530)

The Most Honourable The Marquess of Dorset KG KB PC
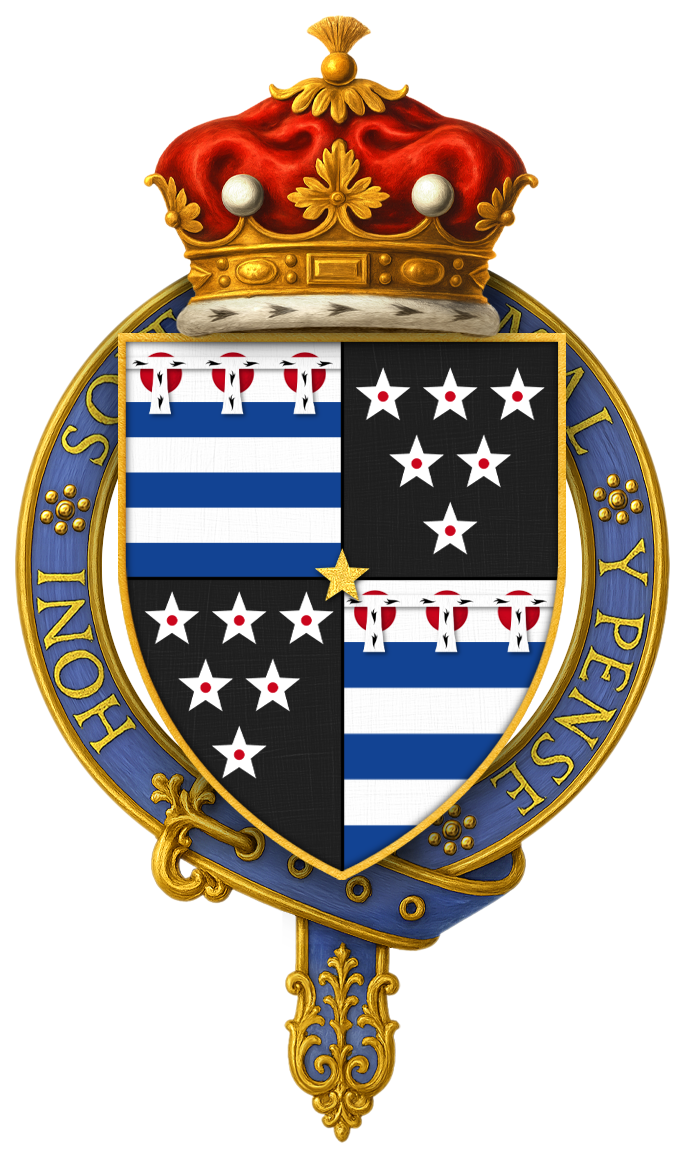
- Arms of Thomas Grey, 2nd Marquess of Dorset, KG

2nd Marquess of Dorset
- Preceded by: Thomas Grey
- Succeeded by: Henry Grey

Personal details
- Born: 22 June 1477
- Died: 10 October 1530 (aged 53)
- Spouse(s): Eleanor St John; Margaret Wotton
- Children: Henry Grey, 1st Duke of Suffolk; Edward Grey; Lord Thomas Grey; Lord John Grey of Pirgo
- Parent(s): Thomas Grey, 1st Marquess of Dorset; Cecily Bonville, Baroness Harington and Bonville
- Occupation: peer, courtier, soldier and landowner

Thomas Grey, 2nd Marquess of Dorset KG KB PC (22 June 1477 – 10 October 1530) was an English peer, courtier, soldier and landowner of the House of Grey.

== Early life ==
Grey was the third son and heir of Thomas Grey, 1st Marquess of Dorset, at that time England's only marquess, and his wife, Cecily Bonville, the daughter and heiress of William Bonville, 6th Baron Harington of Aldingham. His mother was suo jure 7th Baroness Harington of Aldingham and 2nd Baroness Bonville, and the richest heiress in England. The first marquess was the eldest son of Queen Elizabeth Woodville, a stepson of King Edward IV and a half-brother of King Edward V.

According to some reports, the young Grey attended Magdalen College School, Oxford, and he is uncertainly said to have been taught (either at the school or else privately tutored) by the future Cardinal Wolsey. In a French tour, he was tutored or chaperoned by Erasmus.

Grey's father was opposed to King Richard III, and after the older Thomas joined Buckingham's failed rebellion of 1483, father and son fled to Brittany, joining Henry Tudor. Five months after Richard lost the crown to Henry at the Battle of Bosworth Field on 22 August 1485, the new king married the first Dorset's half-sister Elizabeth of York, but Henry VII was also suspicious of Dorset, who was imprisoned during Lambert Simnel's rebellion of 1487. In 1492, Dorset was required to give guarantees of loyalty to the crown and to make the young Thomas Grey a ward of the king.

== Courtier ==
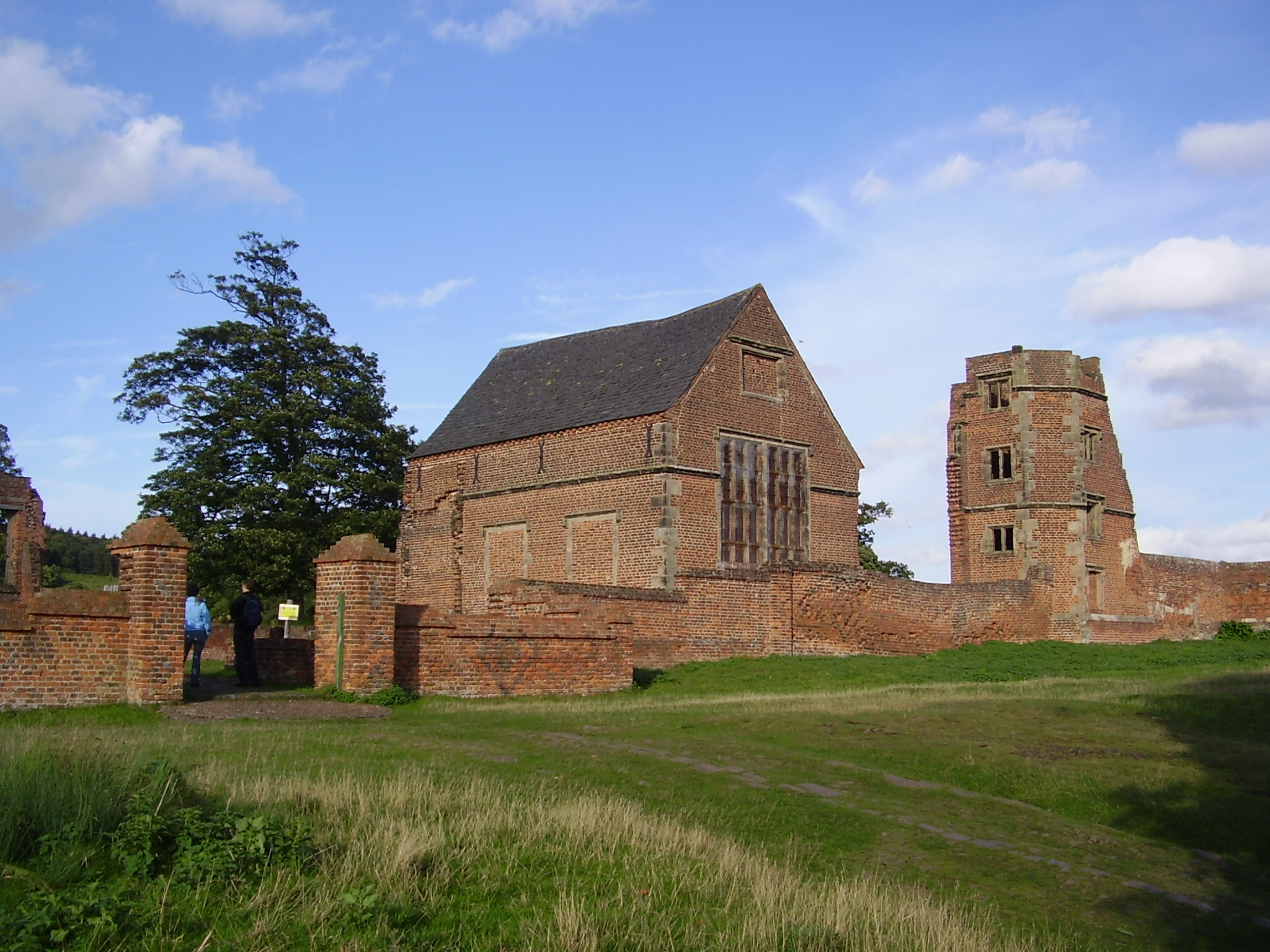
The remains of Dorset's house at Bradgate Park in Leicestershire

Amongst the Queen of England's closest relations, Grey and his younger brothers Leonard and Edward were welcome at court and became courtiers and later soldiers. In 1494, Grey was made a knight of the Bath and in 1501 a knight of the Garter. Also in 1501, his father died and the younger Thomas inherited his titles and some of his estates. However, much of the first marquess's land went to his widow and not to his son, who did not come into his full inheritance until the death of his mother in 1529, shortly before his own death.

Later in 1501, he was 'chief answerer' at the marriage of Arthur, Prince of Wales, and Catherine of Aragon and was presented with a diamond and ruby Tudor rose at a court tournament. But in 1508 he was sent to the Tower of London, and later a gaol in Calais, under suspicion of conspiracy against Henry VII. Although he was saved from execution in 1509 by the accession of King Henry VIII, Grey was attainted and lost his titles. However, later in 1509, he was pardoned and returned to court, and was summoned to parliament as Baron Ferrers of Groby. In 1511, he was summoned as Marquess of Dorset.

From 1509, Dorset was again an active courtier and took part with great distinction in many court tournaments. In February 1511, he took part in the Westminster Tournament, held to celebrate the birth of Henry, Duke of Cornwall. Dorset was paired with Thomas Boleyn in costumes featuring emblems of pilgrimage to Santiago de Compostela. In March 1524 he nearly killed the king.

In 1511, Dorset sold land near Althorp, Northamptonshire, to John Spencer. The sale included the villages of Little Brington and Great Brington, as well their parish church of St Mary the Virgin.

In 1514, with Charles Brandon, 1st Duke of Suffolk, Dorset escorted Henry VII's daughter Princess Mary to France for her wedding to King Louis XII.

Dorset owned land in sixteen English counties and was a justice of the peace for several of them. In 1516, during a rivalry in Leicestershire with George, Baron Hastings, and Sir Richard Sacheverell, Dorset unlawfully increased his retinue at court and was brought before the Star Chamber and the Court of King's Bench. He was bound over for good behaviour. As part of this rivalry, he greatly enlarged his ancestral home at Bradgate, Leicestershire.

In 1520, at the Field of Cloth of Gold, Dorset carried the sword of state. In 1521, he met the Holy Roman Emperor Charles V at Gravelines on the coast of France and escorted him on a visit to England. He helped with the entertainment of the court by maintaining a company of actors.

In 1521, Dorset sat in judgment on the Duke of Buckingham, despite being related to him by blood and marriage. Henry VIII rewarded Dorset with three of Buckingham's manors.

From 17 June 1523 until his death in 1530, Dorset was Justice in Eyre south of Trent. As such, he presided at the triennial Court of justice-seat, which dealt with matters of forest law.

In 1524, Dorset's Leicestershire feud with Lord Hastings turned into a fight between hundreds of men, and Cardinal Wolsey took action. Both rivals had to put up a bond for good behaviour of one thousand pounds, and Dorset was sent to Wales as Lord Master of Princess Mary's Council.

In 1528, Dorset became constable of Warwick Castle, and in 1529 of Kenilworth Castle.

In 1529, recalling his role as 'chief answerer' at the marriage of Arthur, Prince of Wales, Dorset was a critical witness in favour of Henry VIII's divorce of Catherine of Aragon. He strongly supported the King's contention that Arthur and Catherine's marriage had been consummated.

In 1530, in the final months of his life, he assisted the King in the condemnation of Cardinal Wolsey.

== Soldier ==
In 1512, during the War of the League of Cambrai, Dorset led an unsuccessful English military expedition to France to reconquer Aquitaine, which England had lost during the Hundred Years' War. Ferdinand of Aragon gave none of the support he had promised. While Ferdinand delayed and tried to persuade Dorset to help him to attack Navarre instead of Aquitaine, the English army's food, beer and pay ran out, many took to wine and became ill, and the army mutinied.

In 1513, he fought at the siege of Tournai and the Battle of Guinegate (also known as the Battle of the Spurs), and fought again in 1523 in the Scottish borders. These all gave him chances to make amends for the debacle of Aquitaine. To help Dorset in dealing with the Scots, he was appointed Lord Warden of the Marches, restored to the Privy Council, and became a gentleman of the chamber.

== Family ==
Grey was the son and heir of Thomas Grey, 1st Marquess of Dorset (c. 1456–1501), and his wife, Cecily Bonville, daughter and heiress of William Bonville, 6th Baron Harington of Aldingham and of Lady Katherine Neville (1442–1503) and granddaughter of Alice Neville, 5th Countess of Salisbury (1407–1462). Cecily Bonville's maternal uncles included Richard Neville, 16th Earl of Warwick (called 'Warwick the Kingmaker'), John Neville, 1st Marquess of Montagu and George Neville, archbishop of York and Chancellor of England, while her aunts had married Henry de Beauchamp, 1st Duke of Warwick, William FitzAlan, 16th Earl of Arundel, Thomas Stanley, 1st Earl of Derby, and John de Vere, 13th Earl of Oxford. Cecily Bonville succeeded her father as Baroness Harington in 1460, and two months later succeeded her great-grandfather William Bonville as Baron Bonville. After the death of her first husband, Cecily Bonville married her late husband's first cousin Henry Stafford, 1st Earl of Wiltshire, the younger son of Henry Stafford, 2nd Duke of Buckingham and of Catherine Woodville, Dorset's aunt.

The younger Thomas Grey's paternal grandparents were Queen Elizabeth Woodville (c. 1437–1492) and her first husband Sir John Grey of Groby (c. 1432–1461), son and heir of Elizabeth Ferrers, Lady Ferrers of Groby, so his father the first marquess was a stepson of King Edward IV and a half-brother of King Edward V. His grandfather, Sir John Grey, was killed at the Second Battle of St Albans (1461), fighting on the Lancastrian side. His grandmother, Elizabeth Woodville, was the eldest daughter of Richard Woodville, 1st Earl Rivers, and Jacquetta of Luxembourg, widow of John of Lancaster, 1st Duke of Bedford. Following his grandmother's marriage to Edward IV, members of her family gained advantages and made prosperous marriages. Elizabeth's brother John Woodville, at the age of twenty, married Catherine Neville, dowager Duchess of Norfolk, then in her late sixties.

Grey's father-in-law Oliver St John (died in 1497) (also known as Oliver of Ewell) was the son of Margaret Beauchamp (c. 1411–1482), the great-great-granddaughter of Roger Beauchamp, 1st Lord Beauchamp of Bletso, Keeper of Devizes Castle, and heiress to the Beauchamp estates. After the death of her first husband, another Oliver St John (died 1437), she married John Beaufort, 1st Duke of Somerset (1404–1444), producing Margaret Beaufort, Countess of Richmond. Eleanor St John was therefore the first cousin of Henry VII. Through Jacquetta of Luxembourg, Dorset was descended from Eleanor of England (1215–1275), the daughter of King John and Isabella of Angoulême, and from several other European royal families.

His younger brother Leonard Grey, 1st Viscount Grane (c. 1479 – 1541) served as Lord Lieutenant of Ireland from 1536 to 1540.

His second wife had two notable brothers, Sir Edward Wotton (1489–1551), Treasurer of Calais, and Nicholas Wotton (c. 1497–1567), a diplomat who, in 1539, arranged the marriage between Henry VIII and Anne of Cleves.

=== Marriages and descendants ===
Thomas Grey was contracted in 1483 to marry Anne St Leger (1476–1526), the daughter of Anne of York, Duchess of Exeter and her second husband Sir Thomas St Leger. Remarkably, Anne St Leger had been declared the heiress to the Exeter estates, but the marriage did not take place.

The young Thomas Grey's first marriage was to Eleanor St John, a daughter of Oliver St John of Lydiard Tregoze, Wiltshire and of his wife Elizabeth Scrope, daughter of Henry le Scrope, 4th Baron Scrope of Bolton.

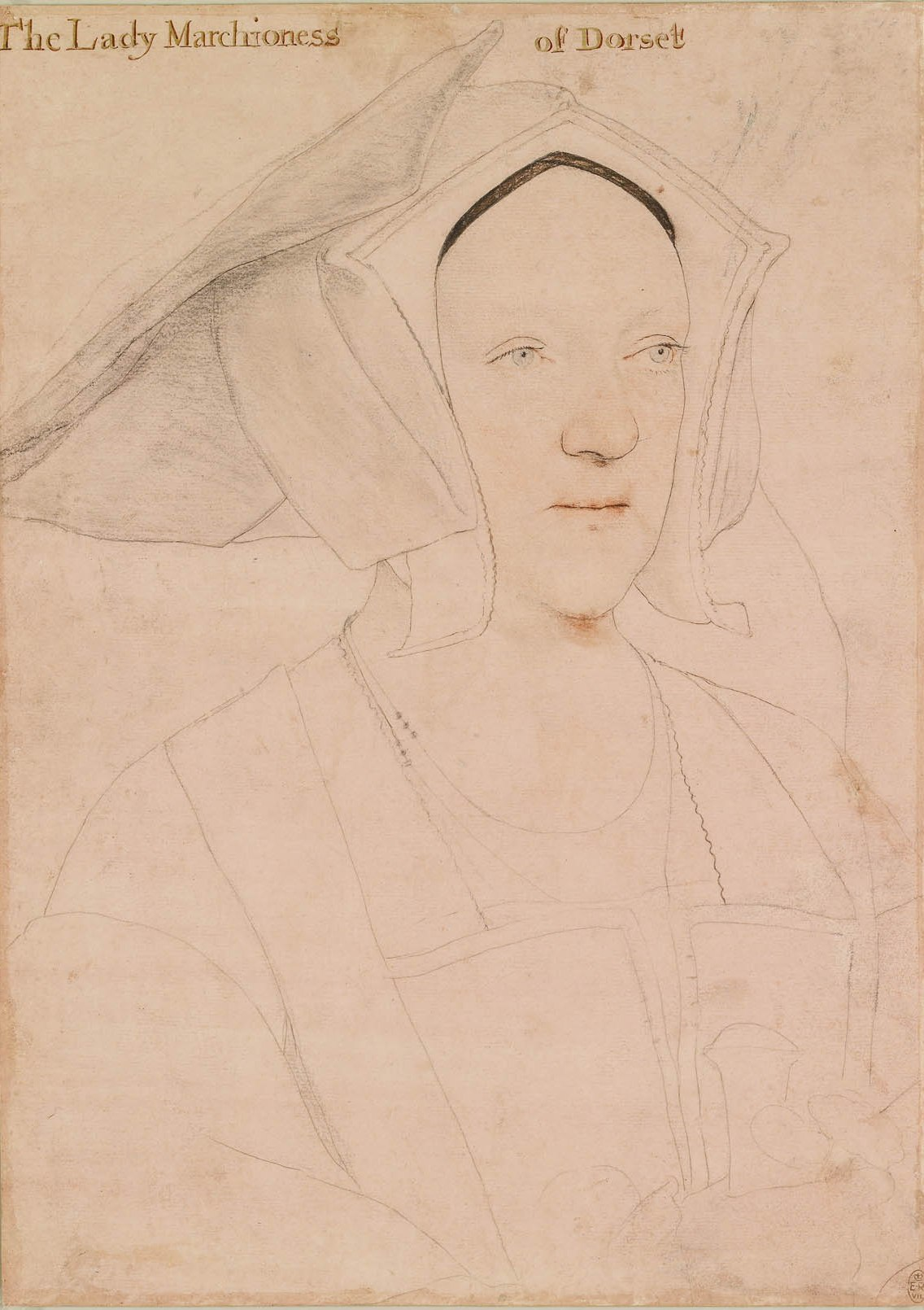
Margaret Grey, Marchioness of Dorset, by Hans Holbein the Younger, 1532–35

In 1509, Thomas Grey, now Lord Ferrers of Groby, married secondly Margaret Wotton, daughter of Sir Robert Wotton (c. 1463–1524) of Boughton Malherbe, Kent, and the widow of William Medley. She survived him and died in or after 1535. With Margaret, the younger Thomas Grey had four sons and four daughters.

- Mary (c 1508-22 Feb 1534), married Walter Devereux, Viscount Hereford.
- Elizabeth (c 1510- 4 April 1561) married Thomas Audley, 1st Baron Audley of Walden and was the grandmother of Thomas Howard, 1st Earl of Suffolk.
- Catherine (c 1516- 1 May 1542) married Henry FitzAlan, 12th Earl of Arundel.
- Henry Grey, 1st Duke of Suffolk (1517–1554). Succeeded his father as Marquess of Dorset, married Lady Frances Brandon, a granddaughter of King Henry VII, and in 1551 (on the death of his brother-in-law Charles Brandon, 3rd Duke of Suffolk) became Duke of Suffolk, by way of a new creation. His daughter (Dorset's granddaughter) Lady Jane Grey was the designated successor of King Edward VI by his will, and for nine days in July 1553 briefly sat on the throne of England.
- Leonard (c 1520-1521), died in infancy.
- Anne (11 Jan 1520-17 Aug 1548), married Henry Willoughby, Baron Willoughby of Wollaton.
- John (c 1523- 19 Nov 1564), Lord Pirgo, married Mary Browne, daughter of Anthony Browne.
- Thomas (c 1526)

In 1554, Henry, John and Thomas took part in Wyatt's rebellion against Mary I's marriage to Philip of Spain and in support of Lady Jane Grey. When this rebellion failed, all three were arrested, and Suffolk and his brother Thomas were executed, as were Lady Jane herself and her husband Lord Guildford Dudley. Lord John Grey survived, and in July 1603 his youngest son, Henry Grey, was restored to the House of Lords by King James I as Baron Grey of Groby.

== Death ==
Dorset died on 10 October 1530, and was buried in the collegiate church at Astley in Warwickshire. When he died, he held estates in London and in sixteen counties, amounting to over one hundred manors, and was one of the richest men in England. His grave was opened in the early seventeenth century and measurement of his skeleton suggested a height of 5 feet 8 inches (173 cm).

Peerage of England
Preceded by Thomas Grey	Marquess of Dorset; 1501–1530	Succeeded by Henry Grey
Preceded by Thomas Grey	Baron Ferrers of Groby; 1501–1530	Succeeded by Henry Grey
Preceded by Cecily Bonville	Baron Harington, Baron Bonville; 1529–1530	Succeeded by Henry Grey
