= John Radcliffe (MP, died 1568) =

English politician

Sir John Radcliffe
- Born: 31 December 1539
- Died: 9 November 1568 (aged 28)
- Buried: Buried 19 November 1568 at St Olave's, Hart Street
- Spouse: Lady Anne [unknown]
- Father: Robert Radcliffe, 1st Earl of Sussex
- Mother: Mary Arundell

Sir John Radcliffe (31 December 1539 – 9 November 1568), was the son of Robert Radcliffe, 1st Earl of Sussex, and his third wife, Mary Arundell.

== Family ==
Sir John Radcliffe, baptized on 31 December 1539 at the church of St Lawrence Pountney in London, was the younger but only surviving son of Robert Radcliffe, 1st Earl of Sussex, and his third wife, Mary Arundell. By his father's two earlier marriages he had three brothers and two sisters of the half blood.

Sir John Radcliffe's father, Robert Radcliffe, 1st Earl of Sussex, married firstly, shortly after 23 July 1505, Elizabeth Stafford, the elder daughter of Henry Stafford, 2nd Duke of Buckingham, and Katherine Woodville, by whom he had three sons:

- Henry Radcliffe, 2nd Earl of Sussex (1507–1542), father of Thomas Radcliffe, 3rd Earl of Sussex, a leading figure at the court of Queen Elizabeth.
- Sir Humphrey Radcliffe (c. 1508/9–13 August 1566) of Elstow, Bedfordshire, who married Isabel Harvey, daughter and heir of Edmund Harvey of Elstow and Margaret Wentworth, by whom he had two sons, Thomas Radcliffe, and Edward Radcliffe, 6th Earl of Sussex, and four daughters, Mary Radcliffe, who was a lady-in-waiting to Queen Elizabeth, Frances Radcliffe, Elizabeth Radcliffe, and Martha Radcliffe.
- George Radcliffe, who married Catherine Marney, the daughter of John Marney, 2nd Baron Marney.

After Elizabeth Stafford's death, Sussex married secondly, by 1 September 1532, Margaret Stanley, the only daughter of Thomas Stanley, 2nd Earl of Derby, and Anne Hastings, the daughter of Edward Hastings, 2nd Baron Hastings, by whom he had two daughters, Jane, who married Anthony Browne, 1st Viscount Montague, and Anne, who married Thomas Wharton, 2nd Baron Wharton.

Sussex married thirdly, on 14 January 1537, Mary Arundell (d. 20 October 1557), the only child of Sir John Arundell (c.1474 – 1545) of Lanherne, Cornwall, and his second wife, Katherine Grenvile, by whom he had two sons, a first-born son baptized 22 March 1538 who died in infancy, and a younger son, Sir John Radcliffe, the subject of this article.

Sussex died on 27 November 1542, and his widow, Sir John Radcliffe's mother, Mary, married, on 19 December 1545, as his second wife, Henry FitzAlan, Earl of Arundel (d. 24 February 1580). There were no issue of the marriage. However, by his mother's second marriage Sir John Radcliffe was a stepbrother of the Earl of Arundel's three children by his first marriage to Katherine Grey (b. in or after 1509, d. 1542), second daughter of Thomas Grey, 2nd Marquess of Dorset (1477–1530), and his second wife, Margaret Wotton.

- Henry FitzAlan (1538–1556), later Lord Maltravers.
- Jane FitzAlan (1537–1578), who was the first wife of John Lumley, 1st Baron Lumley (c.1533-1609), and by him had two sons and a daughter who all died in childhood.
- Mary FitzAlan (1539/40–1557), who married, as his first wife, Thomas Howard, 4th Duke of Norfolk, and by him had an only child, Philip Howard, Earl of Arundel.

== Career ==
Radcliffe was knighted on 22 February 1557.

He appears to have had literary interests. His stepsister, Mary Fitzalan, translated into Latin 'four collections of sententiae, from Greek and English sources' (now BL, Royal MSS 12 A.i–iv), which she dedicated as New Year's gifts to her father. The final one, according to Hodgson-Wright, was 'a joint effort with her stepbrother John Ratcliffe'.

Radcliffe was a Member of Parliament for Castle Rising in 1558 and Grampound in 1559.

Radcliffe's mother, Mary, died on 20 or 21 October 1557 at the Earl of Arundel's London house, Bath Place. Sir John Radcliffe died on 9 November 1568, and was buried on 19 November at St Olaves, Hart Street, in London.

== Engagement and issue ==
Radcliffe was engaged to a woman named Anne. However nothing further is known of her, and there was no known issue of the marriage.
