= Lady Mary FitzAlan =

English noblewoman (1540–1557)

Her Grace The Duchess of Norfolk
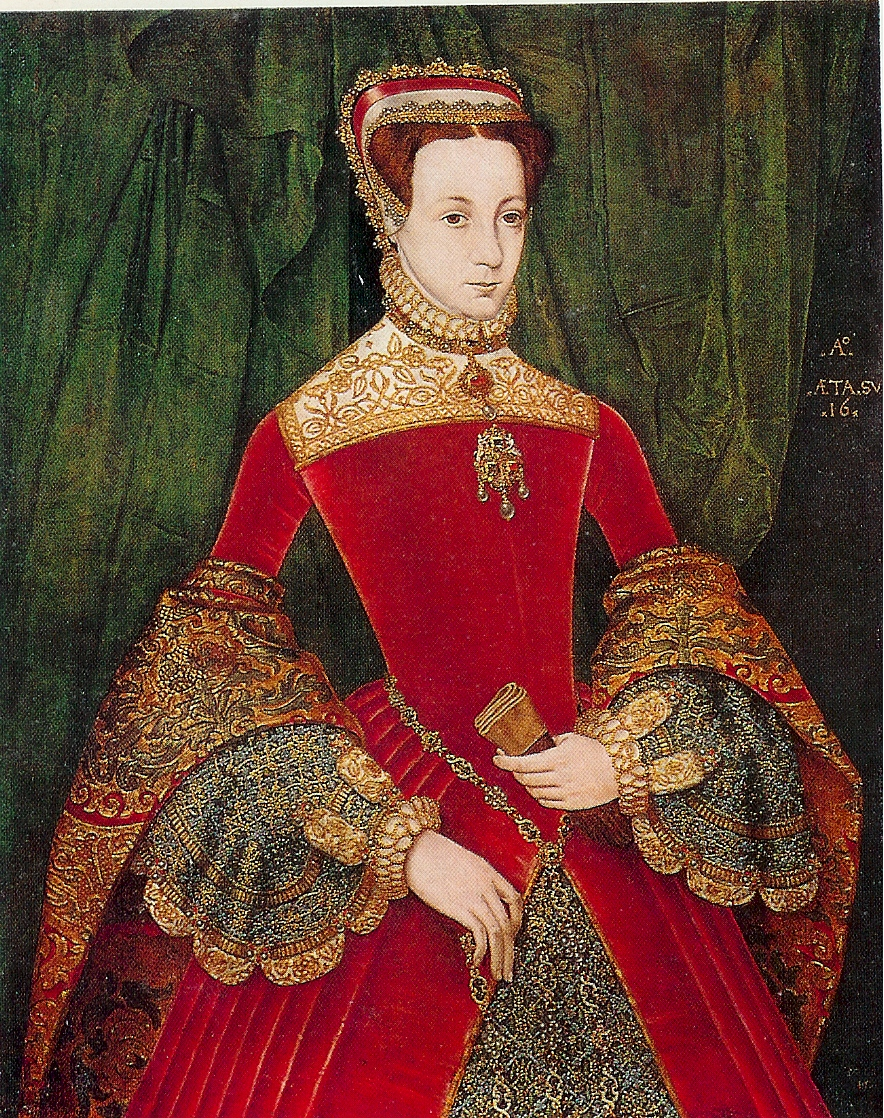
- Mary, Duchess of Norfolk, 1556, by Hans Eworth
- Born: Lady Mary FitzAlan; 1540
- Died: 23/25 August 1557 (aged 16-17); Arundel House, The Strand, Middlesex, England
- Buried: first at St Clement Danes, London and then at Fitzalan Chapel, Arundel
- Noble family: FitzAlan (by birth); Howard (by marriage)
- Spouse: Thomas Howard, 4th Duke of Norfolk
- Issue: Philip Howard, 13th Earl of Arundel
- Parents: Henry FitzAlan, 12th Earl of Arundel; Lady Katherine Grey

Mary Howard, Duchess of Norfolk (née Lady Mary FitzAlan; 1540 – 23/25 August 1557) was an English noblewoman. The daughter and sole heiress of Henry FitzAlan, 12th Earl of Arundel, she married Thomas Howard, 4th Duke of Norfolk. She died aged seventeen shortly after the birth of her son, the Catholic Saint Philip Howard, 13th Earl of Arundel, who lived to unite the FitzAlans and Howards into one dynasty, with Arundel Castle as its seat.

== Early life ==
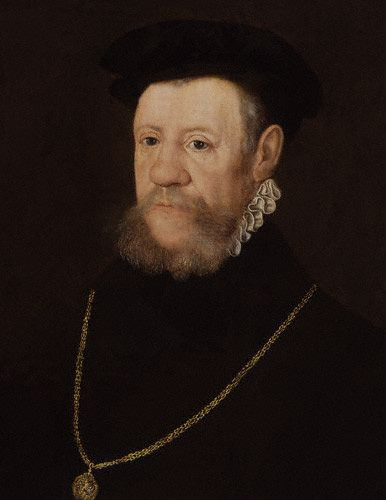
Henry FitzAlan, 12th Earl of Arundel, Mary's father

Mary was born in 1540, being the third and last of the children of Henry FitzAlan, 12th Earl of Arundel by his first wife, Katherine Grey. Her older siblings were Jane, born 1537 and Henry, Lord Maltravers, born 1538. Her paternal grandparents were William FitzAlan, 11th Earl of Arundel and his second wife Anne Percy. Her maternal grandparents were Thomas Grey, 2nd Marquess of Dorset, and Margaret Wotton. On her mother's side, Mary was a niece of Henry Grey, Duke of Suffolk and first cousin of Lady Jane Grey, executed in 1554 after their alleged involvement in the Wyatt's Rebellion, which was intended to prevent the marriage of Queen Mary I with Philip II of Spain.

As girls, both Mary and her sister Jane received a careful education. Several of her translations from Greek to Latin have been preserved.

In 1556, her brother Henry, Lord Maltravers died, making Mary and Jane co-heiresses to the Earldom of Arundel.

== Marriage and issue ==
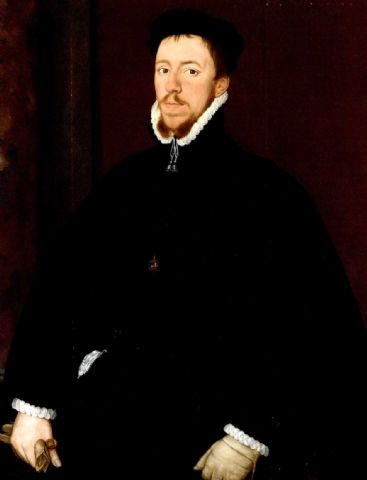
Thomas Howard, 4th Duke of Norfolk, Mary's only spouse

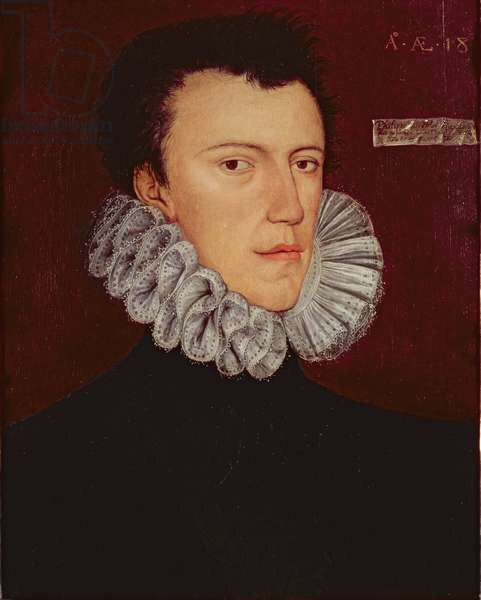
Philip Howard, only son of Mary and the Duke of Norfolk

In the spring of 1555, aged 15, she was married to Thomas Howard, 4th Duke of Norfolk. The marriage was arranged by the 3rd Duke of Norfolk, groom's grandfather in 1553-1554 with the aim of uniting the two most prominent Catholic families in England.

Mary became pregnant at the end of 1556, giving birth at Arundel House, Strand, London on 28 June 1557 to what would be her only child:

- Philip Howard, 13th Earl of Arundel, Earl of Surrey (by courtesy) from 1557 to 1572. For remaining loyal to Catholicism, he was imprisoned in the Tower of London in April 1585, remaining there until his death from natural causes in October 1595. Shortly after his death he was declared a Catholic martyr, and he was canonised in 1970 as one of the so-called Forty Martyrs of England and Wales. His tomb and shrine are in Arundel Cathedral.

The Duchess suffered serious health complications after the birth of Philip, possibly due to a puerperal infection. She never recovered and died at Arundel House on 23 or 25 August 1557, eight weeks after the birth of her son. After the funeral, she was buried on 1 September 1557 in the Church of St Clement Danes in London. Decades later, based on the provisions of the will of her grandson Thomas Howard, 14th Earl of Arundel, her remains were moved to the Fitzalan Chapel in Arundel.

Upon the death of her father in 1580, the earldom of Arundel passed to Mary's son Philip, all of his aunt Jane's children having predeceased her, and Jane having predeceased her father Henry.

== Translations ==
Mary Arundell, Mary Fitzalan's stepmother, was earlier reputed to be among the learned women of her time as the alleged translator of the Sayings and Doings of the Emperor Severus and the Select Sentences of the Seven Wise Men of Greece. However, according to Grummitt, 'The claims once made for her literary attainments have proved to be unfounded; the translations of classical texts surviving among the royal manuscripts in the British Library, once attributed to her, are children's exercises written by her stepdaughter Mary, later duchess of Norfolk'.

It is now known that these four collections of sententiae from Greek and English sources (BL, Royal MSS 12 A.i–iv) were translated into Latin, not by Mary Arundell, but by Mary FitzAlan, later the first wife of Thomas Howard, 4th Duke of Norfolk, and dedicated as New Year's gifts to her father, Mary Arundell's second husband, Henry FitzAlan, 19th Earl of Arundel (d. 24 February 1580). According to Hodgson-Wright, two were written before Mary FitzAlan's marriage and two afterwards, one of the earlier ones having been co-translated with Mary FitzAlan's stepbrother, Sir John Radcliffe, Mary Arundell's only surviving son from her first marriage to Robert Radcliffe, 1st Earl of Sussex.

== Ancestry ==
Ancestors of Lady Mary FitzAlan

16. William FitzAlan, 9th Earl of Arundel
8. Thomas FitzAlan, 10th Earl of Arundel
17. Lady Joan Neville
4. William FitzAlan, 11th Earl of Arundel
18. Richard Woodville, 1st Earl Rivers
9. Lady Margaret Woodville
19. Jacquetta of Luxembourg
2. Henry FitzAlan, 12th Earl of Arundel
20. Henry Percy, 3rd Earl of Northumberland
10. Henry Percy, 4th Earl of Northumberland
21. Eleanor Poynings, Lady Poynings
5. Lady Anne Percy
22. William Herbert, 1st Earl of Pembroke
11. Lady Maud Herbert
23. Anne Devereux
1. Lady Mary FitzAlan, Duchess of Norfolk
24. Sir John Grey
12. Thomas Grey, 1st Marquess of Dorset
25. Elizabeth Woodville, Queen of England
6. Thomas Grey, 2nd Marquess of Dorset
26. William Bonville, 6th Baron Harington
13. Cecily Bonville, Baroness Harington and Bonville
27. Lady Katherine Neville
3. Lady Katherine Grey
28. Nicholas Wotton
14. Sir Robert Wotton
29. Elizabeth Bamburgh
7. Margaret Wotton, Marchioness of Dorset
30. Henry Belknap
15. Anne Belknap
31. Margaret Knollys

== Sources ==
- Grummitt, David (2004). "Radcliffe, Robert, first earl of Sussex (1482/3–1542)". Oxford Dictionary of National Biography (online ed.). Oxford University Press. doi:10.1093/ref:odnb/22991. (Subscription, Wikipedia Library access or UK public library membership required.) (subscription required)
- Hodgson-Wright, Stephanie (2004). Howard, Mary, duchess of Norfolk (1539/40–1557). Oxford Dictionary of National Biography. (subscription required)
- This article incorporates text from a publication now in the public domain: Tregellas, Walter Hawken (1885). "Arundell, Mary". In Stephen, Leslie (ed.). Dictionary of National Biography. Vol. 2. London: Smith, Elder & Co.
