= Elizabeth Stafford, Countess of Sussex =

English noblewoman

- Born: c. 1479
- Died: before 11 May 1532
- Spouse: Robert Radcliffe, 1st Earl of Sussex
- Issue: Henry Radcliffe, 2nd Earl of Sussex; Sir Humphrey Radcliffe; George Radcliffe
- Father: Henry Stafford, 2nd Duke of Buckingham
- Mother: Lady Katherine Woodville

Elizabeth Stafford, Countess of Sussex (c. 1479 – 11 May 1532) was an English noblewoman.

== Family ==
Elizabeth Stafford was the daughter of Henry Stafford, 2nd Duke of Buckingham, and Lady Katherine Woodville, the daughter of Richard Woodville, 1st Earl Rivers, by Jacquetta of Luxembourg, daughter of Pierre de Luxembourg, Count of St Pol, and was thus a niece of Elizabeth Woodville, queen consort to King Edward IV.

By her father's marriage to Katherine Woodville, Elizabeth Stafford had two brothers, Edward Stafford, 3rd Duke of Buckingham, and Henry Stafford, 1st Earl of Wiltshire, and a sister, Anne, who married firstly, Sir Walter Herbert (died 16 September 1507), an illegitimate son of William Herbert, 1st Earl of Pembroke, and secondly, George Hastings, 1st Earl of Huntingdon.

After the execution of the 2nd Duke of Buckingham, his widow, Katherine Woodville, married Jasper Tudor, second son of Owen Tudor and King Henry V's widow, Catherine of Valois. After Jasper Tudor's death on 21 December 1495, Katherine Woodville married Sir Richard Wingfield (died 22 July 1525). Katherine Woodville died 18 May 1497. After her death, her widower Sir Richard Wingfield married Bridget Wiltshire, daughter and heiress of Sir John Wiltshire of Stone Castle, Kent.

Elizabeth Stafford's only paternal aunt was Margaret Dayrell who was wife to James Tuchet, 7th Baron Audley. Her maternal uncles included (among others) Anthony Woodville, 2nd Earl Rivers, Richard Woodville, 3rd Earl Rivers and Lionel Woodville, Bishop of Salisbury. Her aunts included Elizabeth Woodville and Mary Woodville, married respectively to Edward IV of England and William Herbert, 2nd Earl of Pembroke.

Her first cousins included (among others) John Tuchet, 8th Baron Audley, Thomas Grey, 1st Marquess of Dorset, Richard Grey, Elizabeth of York, Mary of York, Cecily of York, Edward V of England, Margaret of York, Richard of Shrewsbury, 1st Duke of York, Anne of York, George Plantagenet, 1st Duke of Bedford, Katherine of York, Bridget of York and Elizabeth Herbert, 3rd Baroness Herbert.

Her father was executed for treason by order of Richard III of England on 2 November 1483. She would remain in the care of her mother until her own marriage.

Elizabeth Stafford died before 11 May 1532, and was buried in Boreham, Essex.

== Marriage and issue ==
Elizabeth Stafford married, shortly after 23 July 1505, Robert Radcliffe, later the 1st Earl of Sussex, by whom she had three sons:

- Henry Radcliffe, 2nd Earl of Sussex (1507–1542), father of Thomas Radcliffe, 3rd Earl of Sussex, a leading figure at the court of Queen Elizabeth.
- Sir Humphrey Radcliffe (c. 1508/09–13 August 1566) of Elstow, Bedfordshire, who married Isabel Harvey, daughter and heir of Edmund Harvey of Elstow and Margaret Wentworth, daughter of Sir Giles Wentworth, Knight, by whom he had two sons, Edward Radcliffe, 6th Earl of Sussex, and Thomas Radcliffe, and at least three daughters.
- George Radcliffe, who married Catherine Marney, the daughter of John Marney, 2nd Baron Marney.

After Elizabeth Stafford's death, Robert Radcliffe, 1st Earl of Sussex, married secondly, by 1 September 1532, Margaret Stanley, the only daughter of Thomas Stanley, 2nd Earl of Derby, and Anne Hastings, the daughter of Edward Hastings, 2nd Baron Hastings, by whom he had two daughters, Jane, who married Anthony Browne, 1st Viscount Montague, and Anne, who married Thomas Wharton, 2nd Baron Wharton.

Robert Radcliffe, 1st Earl of Sussex, married thirdly, on 14 January 1537, Mary Arundell (died 20 October 1557), the only child of Sir John Arundell (1474–1545) of Lanherne, Cornwall, and his second wife, Katherine Grenvile, by whom he had two sons, a first-born son who died in infancy and whose name is unknown, and a younger son, Sir John Radcliffe (1539 – 9 November 1568). Robert Radcliffe, 1st Earl of Sussex, died 27 November 1542. His widow, Mary, subsequently married, in 1545, as his second wife, Henry FitzAlan, Earl of Arundel (died 24 February 1580).

== Ancestry ==
Ancestors of Elizabeth Stafford, Countess of Sussex

16. Edmund Stafford, 5th Earl of Stafford
8. Humphrey Stafford, 1st Duke of Buckingham
17. Lady Anne of Gloucester
4. Humphrey Stafford, Earl of Stafford
18. Ralph Neville, 1st Earl of Westmorland
9. Lady Anne Neville
19. Lady Joan Beaufort
2. Henry Stafford, 2nd Duke of Buckingham
20. John Beaufort, 1st Earl of Somerset
10. Edmund Beaufort, 2nd Duke of Somerset
21. Lady Margaret Holland, Duchess of Clarence
5. Lady Margaret Beaufort, Countess of Stafford
22. Richard de Beauchamp, 13th Earl of Warwick
11. Lady Eleanor Beauchamp
23. Elizabeth de Berkeley
1. Lady Elizabeth Stafford
12. Sir Richard Wydeville
6. Richard Woodville, 1st Earl Rivers
26. John Bedlisgate
13. Joan Bedlisgate
3. Lady Katherine Woodville
28. John of Luxembourg, Lord of Beauvoir
14. Peter of Luxembourg, Count of Saint-Pol
29. Marguerite of Enghien
7. Jacquetta of Luxembourg
30. Francesco del Balzo, 1st Duke of Andria
15. Margaret de Baux
31. Sueva Orsini
