= Fitzalan Chapel =

Chapel at Arundel Castle, West Sussex

Coordinates: 50.856°N 0.557°W

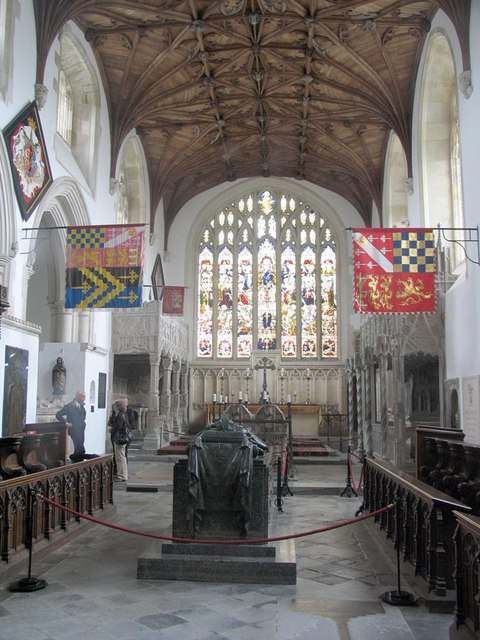
Interior view of the Fitzalan Chapel, Arundel Castle

The Fitzalan Chapel is the chancel of the church of St Nicholas in the western grounds of Arundel Castle, in West Sussex, England. Dating to the 14th century, the chancel is used as the private mausoleum of the FitzAlans and later the Howard family.

The church is one of the very few that is divided into two worship areas, a Catholic area (the chancel) and an Anglican area (the nave and transepts). It is a Grade I-listed building.

== History ==
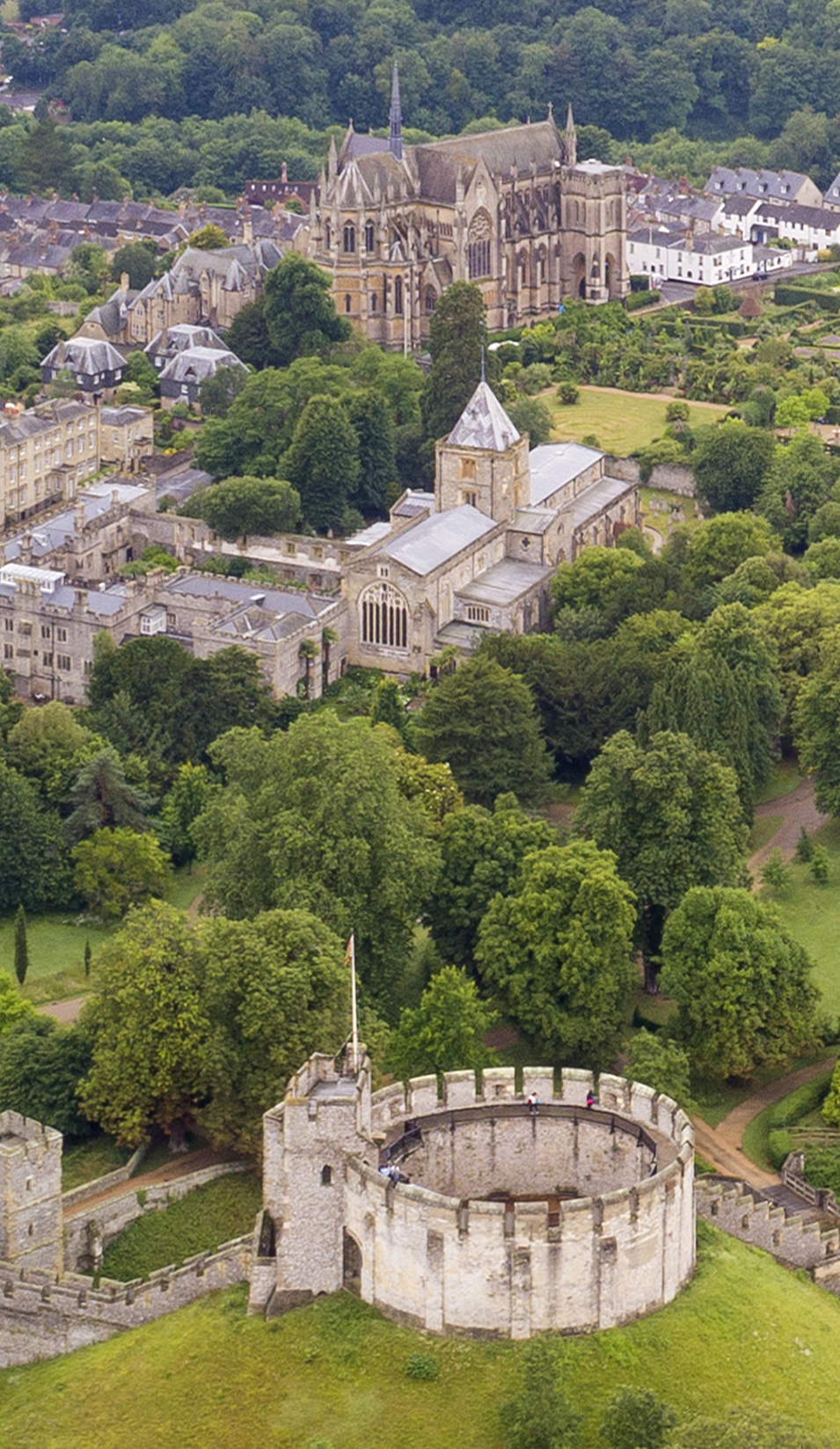
The circular motte and keep of Arundel Castle in the foreground, St Nicholas' Church (with the Fitzalan Chapel) in the midground, and Arundel Roman Catholic Cathedral in the background

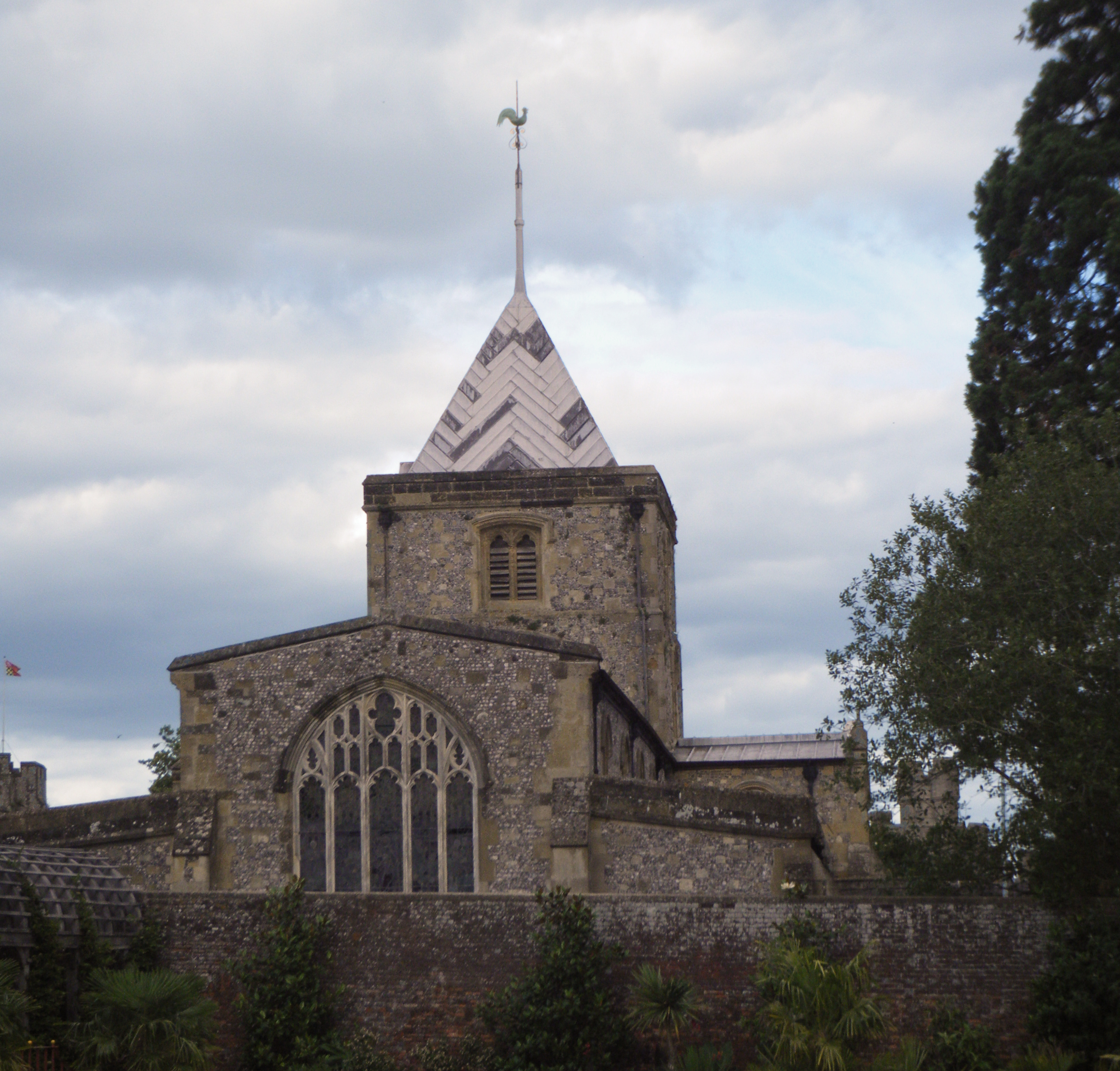
Chapel view from castle gardens

Richard FitzAlan, 3rd Earl of Arundel, was responsible for the building of the Chapel posthumously according to his will. The original Fitzalan Chapel consisted of the entire building, and was built as the Collegiate Church of the Holy Trinity in 1380 by commission of Richard FitzAlan, 4th Earl of Arundel, whose family owned Arundel Castle. It is an example of Perpendicular Gothic architecture, and the architect and mason is believed to have been William Wynford. A number of noted Fitzalan and Howard family members are buried in the chapel, many in tombs adorned with sculpted effigies. Most of the recently deceased Dukes of Norfolk are buried there.

The chapel was badly damaged in 1643 during the siege of Arundel Castle by the Parliamentarians' cannons during the English Civil War. It remained neglected throughout the 18th century. During this period, the Anglican parish was established in the western portion of the church building. Bernard Howard, 12th Duke of Norfolk, is credited with initiating major repairs to the Fitzalan Chapel circa 1837, and his successors expanded and restored the chapel further.

Fitzalan Chapel is now vested in an independent charitable trust (No. 279379), and accepts donations for further maintenance and preservation. It is currently open to the public by access from the castle grounds.

== Burials ==
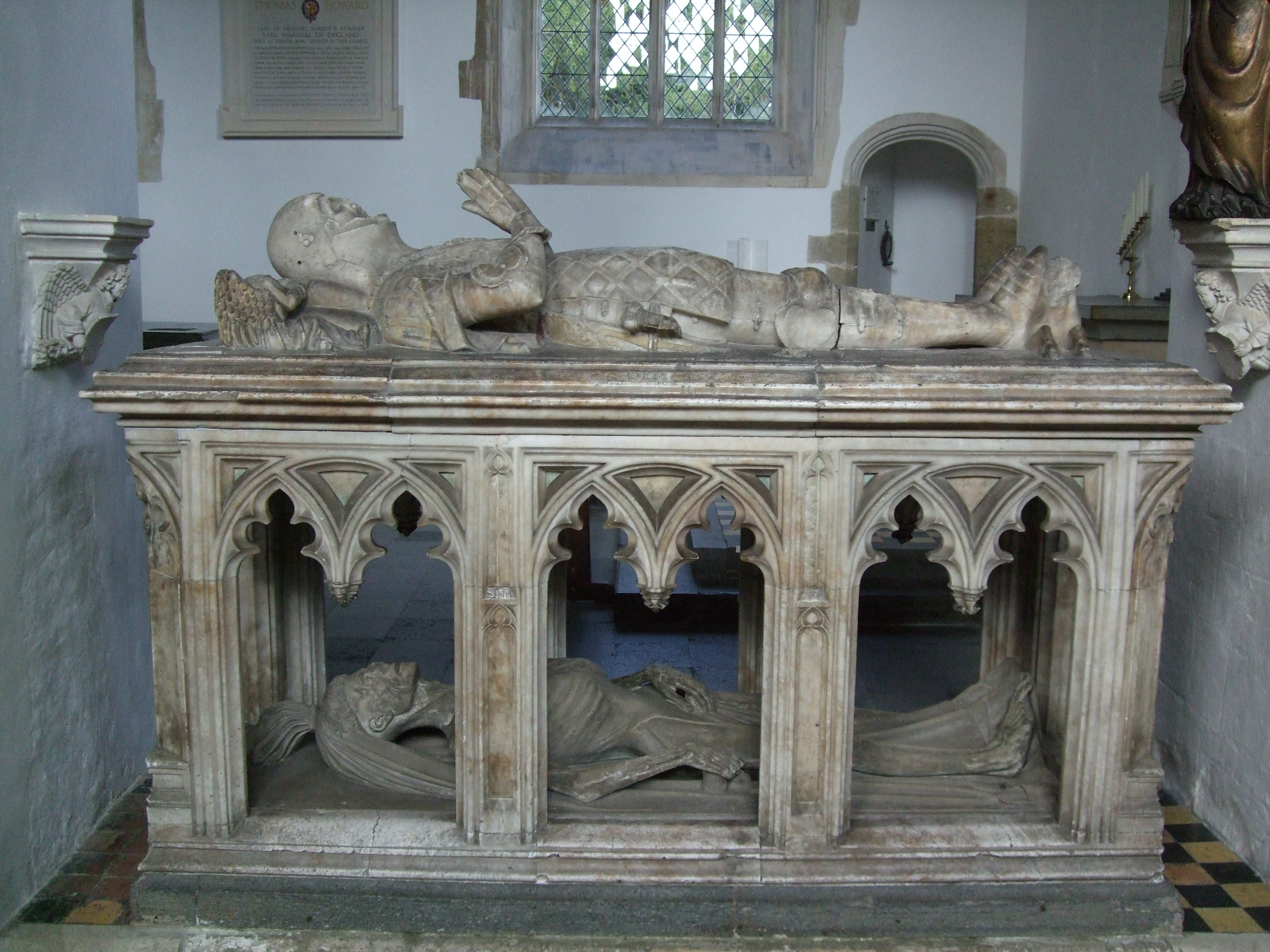
Transi tomb of John Fitzalan, 7th Earl of Arundel

- Thomas FitzAlan, 5th Earl of Arundel (1381–1415)
- Beatrice, Countess of Arundel (c. 1382–1439), wife of the 5th Earl and daughter of King John I of Portugal
- John FitzAlan, 6th Earl of Arundel (1385–1421)
- Eleanor Berkeley, Countess of Arundel (d. 1455), daughter of Sir John Berkeley of Beverstone, Gloucestershire
- John FitzAlan, 7th Earl of Arundel (1408–1435), originally buried at Église des Cordeliers at Beauvais; excavated in the mid-19th century; features cadaver monument
- William FitzAlan, 9th Earl of Arundel (1417–1487)
- Joan Neville, Countess of Arundel (1434–1462), eldest daughter of Richard Neville, 5th Earl of Salisbury
- Thomas Salmon (d. 1430), Chamberlain to King Henry V
- Agnes Salmon (d. 1418), wife of Thomas and Principal Lady-in-Waiting to Beatrice, Countess of Arundel
- William Fitzalan, 11th Earl of Arundel (1476–1544)
- Anne Percy, Countess of Arundel (d. 1552), second wife of the 11th Earl and daughter of Henry Percy, 4th Earl of Northumberland
- Henry Fitzalan, 12th Earl of Arundel (1512–1580)
- Mary Arundell, second wife of the 12th Earl and daughter of John Arundell (1474–1545)
- Mary FitzAlan (1540–1557), first wife of Thomas Howard, 4th Duke of Norfolk; first buried at St. Clement Danes Church and decades later her remains were transferred to Fitzalan Chapel
- Philip Howard, 13th Earl of Arundel (1557–1595); first buried in St. Peter ad Vincula and in 1624 his remains were transferred to the Fitzalan Chapel. In 1971, his remains were exhumed and moved to Arundel Cathedral, a year after Pope Paul VI canonized him as one of the Forty Martyrs of England and Wales.
- Anne Dacre, Countess of Arundel (1557–1630)
- Thomas Howard, 14th Earl of Arundel (1585–1646)
- Henry Howard, 15th Earl of Arundel (1608–1652)
- Lady Elizabeth Stuart (1610–1674), wife of the 15th Earl and daughter of Esme Stuart, 3rd Duke of Lennox
- Henry Howard, 6th Duke of Norfolk (1628–1684)
- Lady Anne Somerset (1631?–1662), first wife of the 6th Duke of Norfolk, daughter of Edward Somerset, 2nd Marquess of Worcester
- Jane Howard, Duchess of Norfolk (1643/4–1693), second wife of the 6th Duke
- Henry Howard, 7th Duke of Norfolk (1655–1701)
- Thomas Howard, 8th Duke of Norfolk (1683–1732)
- Edward Howard, 9th Duke of Norfolk (1686–1777)
- Mary Howard, Duchess of Norfolk (died 1773), wife of the 9th Duke
- Charles Howard, 10th Duke of Norfolk (1720–1786)
- Catherine Brockholes, Duchess of Norfolk (1724–1784), wife of the 10th Duke
- Lord Henry Howard-Molyneux-Howard (1766–1824), brother of the 12th Duke of Norfolk
- Elizabeth Long Howard-Molyneux-Howard (1769–1835), wife of Lord Henry
- Juliana Barbara Howard Ogilvy (1812–1833), daughter of Lord and Lady Henry
- Bernard Howard, 12th Duke of Norfolk (1765–1842)
- Henry Howard, 13th Duke of Norfolk (1791–1856)
- Charlotte Fitzalan-Howard, Duchess of Norfolk (1788–1870), wife of the 13th Duke
- Henry Fitzalan-Howard, 14th Duke of Norfolk (1815–1860)
- Augusta Fitzalan-Howard, Duchess of Norfolk (1821–1886), wife of the 14th Duke
- Edmund Lyons, 1st Baron Lyons (1790–1858), father of Augusta
- Richard Lyons, 1st Viscount Lyons (1817–1887), brother of Augusta
- Edward Henry Cardinal Howard, Cardinal-Bishop of Frascati (1829–1892)
- Henry Fitzalan-Howard, 15th Duke of Norfolk (1847–1915)
- Flora Fitzalan-Howard, Duchess of Norfolk (1854–1887, first wife of the 15th Duke
- Bernard Fitzalan-Howard, 16th Duke of Norfolk (1908–1975)
- Lavinia Fitzalan-Howard, Duchess of Norfolk (1916–1995), wife of the 16th Duke
- Miles Fitzalan-Howard, 17th Duke of Norfolk (1915–2002)
- Anne Fitzalan-Howard, Duchess of Norfolk (1927–2013), wife of the 17th Duke

== See also ==
- Arundel Castle, in whose grounds the chapel is located
- Arundel Museum, close to the castle entrance
- Earls of Arundel
- Arundel Cathedral
- Arundel Priory
