= Elizabeth Stafford (disambiguation) =

Elizabeth Stafford (died 1599) was Lady of the Bedchamber to Queen Elizabeth I

Elizabeth Stafford may also refer to:

- Elizabeth Stafford, Countess of Sussex (c. 1479–1532), English noblewoman
- Elizabeth Stafford, Duchess of Norfolk (c. 1497–1558)
