= John Radcliffe, 6th Baron Fitzwalter =

English baron (1452–1496)

John Radcliffe, 9th Baron Fitzwalter (or 6th Baron; 1 January 1452 – 24 November 1496) was an English nobleman, 9th Baron FitzWalter from 1485.

== Life ==
He was born in Guînes, France, the son of Sir John Radcliffe of Attleborough and his wife Elizabeth FitzWalter, 8th Baroness FitzWalter. After his mother's death, he inherited the family estates in Essex, and the baronial title. In 1485, he became the Lord Steward of the Household. In 1486, he was appointed caretaker and chief judge of the royal forests south of Trent, together with Sir Reginald Bray. In 1495, Radcliffe was accused of plotting to install the Yorkist claimant Perkin Warbeck on the throne. His title and possessions were confiscated and he was imprisoned in Guînes. After a futile attempt to escape by bribing his jailors, he was beheaded in November 1496.

== Family ==
Radcliffe married, first (before 12 March 1476) Anne, sister of Sir Richard Whethill of Calais; his second wife is usually supposed to have been Anne, daughter of Edward Hastings, 2nd Baron Hastings, who in 1507, if not earlier, became the wife of Thomas Stanley, 2nd Earl of Derby (died 1521) and died in 1550. By his first wife Radcliffe had five daughters and one son. The attainder was removed in favour of his son Robert, afterwards first Earl of Sussex, by letters patent of 25 January 1506, confirmed by an Act of Parliament in 1509.
