= Mary Arundell (courtier) =

Courtier

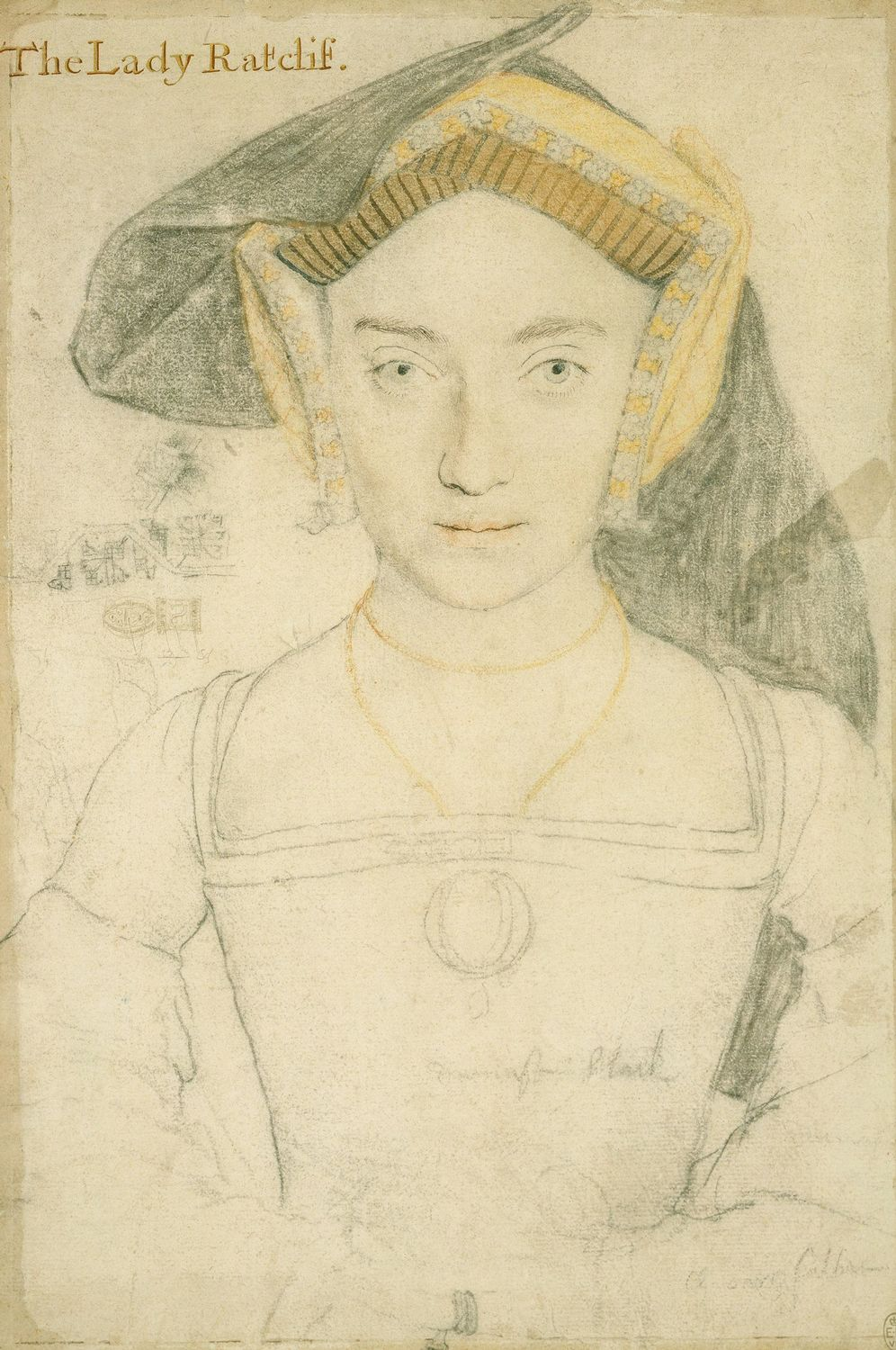
- Portrait by Hans Holbein the Younger
- Born: c. 1512
- Died: 20 or 21 October 1557; Bath House, London, England
- Buried: St Clement Danes, London
- Spouses: Robert Radcliffe, 1st Earl of Sussex; Henry FitzAlan, 19th Earl of Arundel
- Issue: son who died in infancy Sir John Radcliffe
- Father: Sir John Arundell (1474–1545)
- Mother: Katherine Grenville

Mary Arundell, Countess of Arundel (died 20 or 21 October 1557), was an English courtier. She was the only child of Sir John Arundell (1474 – 1545) of Lanherne, Cornwall, by his second wife, Katherine Grenville. She was a gentlewoman at court in the reign of King Henry VIII, serving two of Henry VIII's Queens, and the King's daughter, Princess Mary. She was traditionally believed to have been "the erudite Mary Arundell", the supposed translator of verses now known to have been the work of her stepdaughter, Mary FitzAlan, later the first wife of Thomas Howard, 4th Duke of Norfolk.

== Family ==
Mary Arundell was the only child of Sir John Arundell (c.1474 – 8 February 1545) of Lanherne, Cornwall, and his second wife, Katherine Grenville (born 1489–93), a daughter of Sir Thomas Grenville (d. 1513).

Mary Arundell's father, Sir John Arundell (d. 1545), was the son and heir of Sir Thomas Arundell (c. 1452–1485) (who after the defeat of King Richard III at the Battle of Bosworth (1485) supported Henry Tudor's claim to the throne) by his wife Katherine Dynham, one of the four sisters and coheirs of John Dynham, 1st Baron Dynham (c.1433 – 1501). Sir John Arundell was made a Knight of the Bath when the future King Henry VIII was created Duke of York in 1494, and led troops against the Cornish rebels in 1497 and in France in 1513, where he was made a knight banneret at the siege of Therouanne. He was appointed a justice in Cornwall in 1509, served on numerous commissions in the West Country, and was appointed Receiver of the Duchy of Cornwall by 1508. In 1539, he was appointed to the Council of the West.

Sir John Arundell's first marriage to Eleanor Grey (died c. 1503), the daughter of Thomas Grey, 1st Marquess of Dorset, by his second wife, Cecily Bonville, linked him to a family close to the crown. Following his first wife's death, Sir John Arundell married, by papal dispensation dated 7 December 1503, Katherine Grenvile (born 1489x93), the youngest of the eight children of Sir Thomas Grenville of Stowe, Kilkhampton, Cornwall, by his first wife, Isabella Gilbert.

By his first marriage to Eleanor Grey, Sir John Arundell had a son and heir, Sir John Arundell (c. 1500–1557) of Lanherne, a second son, Sir Thomas Arundell of Wardour Castle (c. 1502–1552), and three daughters, Elizabeth Arundell (d. between 1516 and 1524), who married Sir Richard Edgecumbe, Jane Arundell (d. 1577) and Eleanor Arundell, all of whom were Mary Arundell's siblings of the half blood.

Mary Arundell's half-brother, Sir Thomas Arundell of Wardour (c.1502–1552), married, by settlement dated 20 November 1530, Margaret Howard (c. 1515 – 10 October 1571), the daughter of Lord Edmund Howard and Joyce Culpeper. Margaret was a sister of Queen Katherine Howard, the fifth wife of King Henry VIII, and a first cousin of the King's second wife, Queen Anne Boleyn.

== Career ==
Mary Arundell came to court in 1536, and served at least two of Henry VIII's Queens, Jane Seymour, and Anne of Cleves, as well as the King's daughter, the future Queen Mary. According to Agnes Strickland, she was a Great Lady of the Queen's Household to Katherine Howard.

Mary Arundell's half brother, Sir Thomas Arundell of Wardour Castle, is said to have arranged her first marriage to Robert Radcliffe, 1st Earl of Sussex, and at the same time to have entered into negotiations with Thomas Cromwell, who wished to marry his son, Gregory, to Sir Thomas Arundell's sister, Jane Arundell (d. 1577). In the end, Jane did not marry, but served as a gentlewoman in the household of Queen Mary, and eventually returned to Lanherne, her father, Sir John Arundell (c. 1474 – 8 February 1545), having provided for her financially. Jane Arundell is commemorated in St. Mawgan church.

Mary Arundell was earlier reputed to be among the learned women of her time as the alleged translator of the Sayings and Doings of the Emperor Severus and the Select Sentences of the Seven Wise Men of Greece. However, according to Grummitt, 'The claims once made for her literary attainments have proved to be unfounded; the translations of classical texts surviving among the royal manuscripts in the British Library, once attributed to her, are children's exercises written by her stepdaughter Mary, later duchess of Norfolk'.

It is now known that these four collections of sententiae from Greek and English sources (BL, Royal MSS 12 A.i–iv) were translated into Latin, not by Mary Arundell, but by Mary FitzAlan, later the first wife of Thomas Howard, 4th Duke of Norfolk, and dedicated as New Year's gifts to her father, Mary Arundell's second husband, Henry FitzAlan, 19th Earl of Arundel (d. 24 February 1580). According to Hodgson-Wright, two were written before Mary FitzAlan's marriage and two afterwards, the final one having been co-translated with Mary FitzAlan's stepbrother, Sir John Radcliffe, Mary Arundell's only surviving son from her first marriage to Robert Radcliffe, 1st Earl of Sussex.

In addition to the confusion concerning her alleged authorship of these translations, Mary Arundell has also been confused with Margaret Acland, Lady Arundell (d. 1691), wife of John Arundell, 2nd Baron Arundell of Trerice (d. 1697), of another branch of the Arundells of Cornwall.

Mary Arundell died in London, and was buried at the church of St Clement Danes. A lead coffin, said to contain her remains, was found at Arundel Castle in 1847, and is now buried beneath the floor of the Fitzalan chapel there.

== Marriages and issue ==
Mary Arundell married twice, producing only one surviving son from her first marriage:

- Firstly on 14 January 1537, as his third wife, to Robert Radcliffe, 1st Earl of Sussex (d. 1542), thus Mary Arundell became stepmother of Sussex's three sons and two daughters by his two previous marriages. His first wife, whom he married shortly after 23 July 1505, had been Elizabeth Stafford (the elder daughter of Henry Stafford, 2nd Duke of Buckingham by his wife Katherine Woodville) by whom he had three sons His second marriage, before 1 September 1532, was to Margaret Stanley (only daughter of Thomas Stanley, 2nd Earl of Derby by his wife Anne Hastings, daughter of Edward Hastings, 2nd Baron Hastings) by whom he had two daughters. Mary Arundell bore two sons to Sussex:
  - A first-born son baptised 22 March 1538 who died in infancy
  - Sir John Radcliffe (d. 1568), younger son
- Secondly on 19 December 1545 Mary Arundell married, as his second wife, Henry FitzAlan, 19th Earl of Arundel (d. 1580). There was no issue from the marriage, by which however Mary became stepmother to her new husband's three children from his first marriage to Katherine Grey (c. 1509–1542), second daughter of Thomas Grey, 2nd Marquess of Dorset (1477–1530) by his second wife, Margaret Wotton.
