= Robert Radcliffe, 1st Earl of Sussex =

Earl of Sussex

Robert Radcliffe, 1st Earl of Sussex KG KB PC
- Born: c. 1483
- Died: 27 November 1542; Chelsea, London
- Buried: Buried at Boreham, Essex
- Spouses: Elizabeth Stafford; Margaret Stanley; Mary Arundell
- Issue: Henry Radcliffe, 2nd Earl of Sussex; Sir Humphrey Radcliffe; William Radcliffe; George Radcliffe; Jane Radcliffe; Anne Radcliffe son who died in infancy Sir John Radcliffe
- Father: John Radcliffe, 9th Baron FitzWalter
- Mother: Margaret Whetehill

Robert Radcliffe, 10th Baron Fitzwalter, 1st Earl of Sussex KG KB PC (c. 1483 – 27 November 1542), also spelt Radclyffe, Ratcliffe, Ratcliff, etc., was a prominent courtier and soldier during the reigns of Henry VII and Henry VIII, who served as Chamberlain of the Exchequer and Lord Great Chamberlain.

== Family ==
Robert Radcliffe, born about 1483, was the only son of John Radcliffe (1452–1496), 9th Baron FitzWalter, and Margaret Whetehill, widow of Thomas Walden, gentleman, and daughter of Robert Whetehill, esquire, by his wife, Joan. Radcliffe had five sisters, Mary, the wife of Sir Edward Darrell; Bridget; Ursula; Jane, a nun; and Anne, wife of Sir Walter Hobart.

== Career ==
In October 1495 Robert Radcliffe's father was attainted of high treason for confederacy with the pretender, Perkin Warbeck, by which all his honours were forfeited. His life was spared, and he was imprisoned at Guisnes. After he unsuccessfully attempted to escape, he was beheaded at Calais about 24 November 1496. Radcliffe's mother was living on 6 July 1518. The date of her death is unknown.

In his youth Radcliffe was in the service of King Henry VII and his then elder son and heir, Arthur, Prince of Wales, and was present at Arthur's marriage to Katherine of Aragon on 14 November 1501.

Radcliffe's father's attainder was reversed by letters patent dated 3 November 1505, and later by Act of Parliament in 1509, by which Radcliffe became Baron FitzWalter. On 23 June 1509 he was made a Knight of the Bath, and on the following day officiated as Lord Sewer at the coronation of King Henry VIII. In 1515 he was at Westminster Abbey when Wolsey received his cardinal's hat.

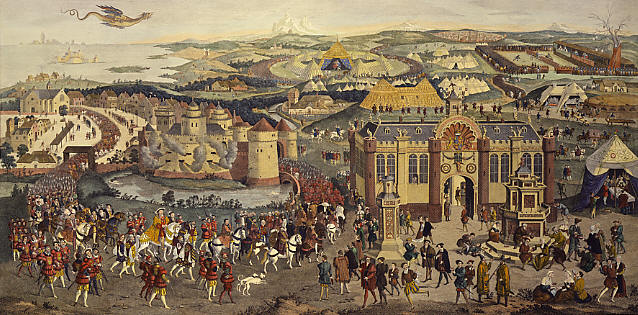
Field of the Cloth of Gold, engraving by James Basire (1774)

Radcliffe served in the vanguard under George Talbot, 4th Earl of Shrewsbury, in the invasion of France in 1513, and was at the sieges of Therouanne and Tournai. In June 1520 he attended Henry VIII at the Field of the Cloth of Gold and at his meetings with the Emperor Charles V in July 1520 and May 1522. In 1521 he served at sea as admiral of a squadron, and was chief captain of the vanguard under the Earl of Surrey when the English forces landed at Morlaix on 1 July and campaigned in Picardy from 30 August to 14 October.

On 7 May 1524 he was installed as a Knight of the Order of the Garter, and on 18 July 1525, at the creation of Henry VIII's illegitimate son, Henry FitzRoy, as Duke of Richmond, Radcliffe was created Viscount Fitzwalter. Further honours and appointments followed. Radcliffe was a member of the Privy Council before 2 February 1526, was created Earl of Sussex on 8 December 1529, appointed Lieutenant of the Order of the Garter on 7 May 1531, and appointed as a Chamberlain of the Exchequer for life on 3 June 1532.

Archbold states that Sussex was for a long period "in very confidential relations" with Henry VIII, and is of the view that it was with the King's knowledge that Sussex proposed to the Privy Council on 6 June 1536 that the King should advance his illegitimate son, Henry FitzRoy, to the crown ahead of Princess Mary, the King's daughter by Katherine of Aragon. Sussex also took the King's part on the divorce issue. He served as Lord Sewer at the coronation of Queen Anne Boleyn on 1 June 1533, and on 2 December 1533 was among the commissioners who took Henry VIII's demands concerning the divorce to Katherine of Aragon.

After the Pilgrimage of Grace, Sussex was commissioned, together with Edward Stanley, 3rd Earl of Derby, to restore order in Lancashire, and as a reward for his services was granted the manor of Cleeve in Somerset. On 23 June 1537 he was granted the reversion of the office of Lord Steward of the Royal Household, although when the current holder, George Talbot, 4th Earl of Shrewsbury, died in the following year he was succeeded, not by Sussex, but by the King's brother-in-law, Charles Brandon, 1st Duke of Suffolk. In 1539 Sussex was one of the commissioners appointed to defend the Thames and the coast of Essex.

On 3 January 1540, he attended Henry VIII at the reception of Anne of Cleves at Blackheath. On 9 March of the same year he was appointed to inquire into the situation in Calais, and after the disgrace and recall to England of Arthur Plantagenet, 1st Viscount Lisle, had charge of Calais from 17 April until July. On 3 August 1540 he was granted a lifetime appointment as Lord Great Chamberlain.

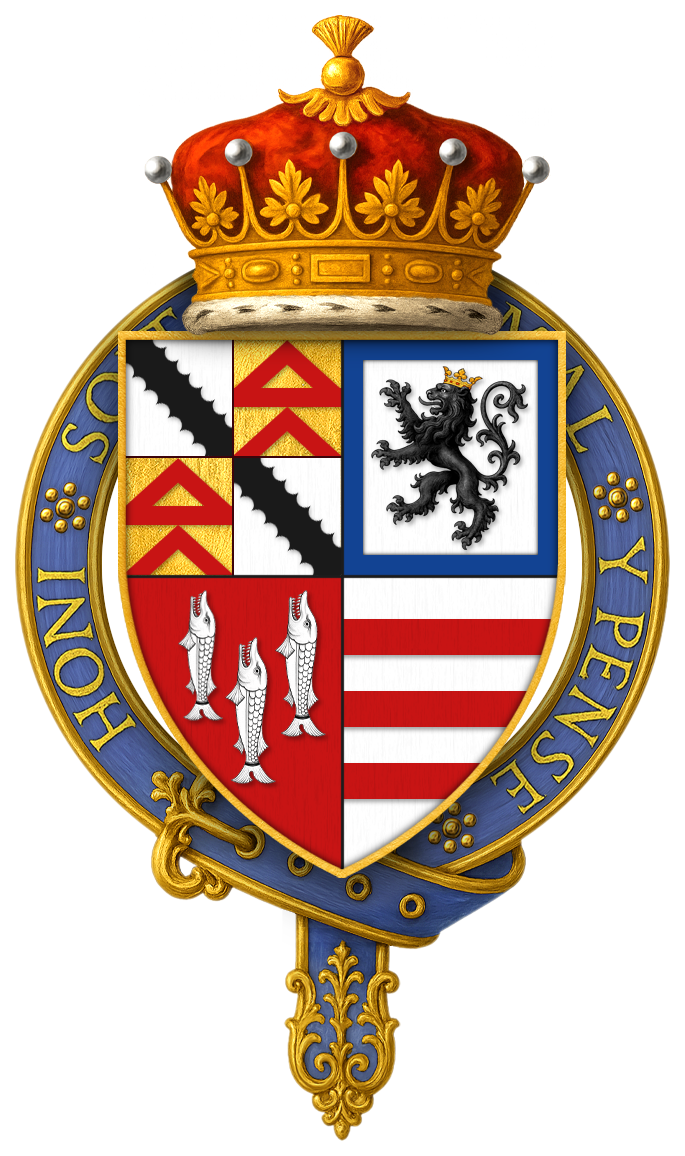
Arms of Sir Robert Radcliffe, 1st Earl of Sussex, KG - Quarterly 1st grand quartered 1 and 4 Argent a bend engrailed Sable for Radcliffe; 2 and 3 Or a fess between two chevrons Gules for Fitzwalter; 2nd Argent a lion rampant ducally crowned Sable a border Azure for Brunell; 3rd Gules three lucies haurient Or for Lucy; 4th Argent three bars Gules for Multon.

Robert Radcliffe died at Chelsea on 28 November 1542 and was buried at Boreham, Essex.

== Marriages and issue ==
Sussex married three times. Firstly shortly after 23 July 1505, to a first cousin of Henry VIII's mother, Elizabeth of York, namely Elizabeth Stafford, the elder daughter of Henry Stafford, 2nd Duke of Buckingham, and Katherine Woodville, by whom he had three sons:

- Henry Radcliffe, 2nd Earl of Sussex (1507–17 February 1557), father of Thomas Radcliffe, 3rd Earl of Sussex, a leading figure at the court of Queen Elizabeth I.
- Sir Humphrey Radcliffe (c. 1508/9–13 August 1566) of Elstow, Bedfordshire, who married Isabel Harvey, daughter and heir of Edmund Harvey of Elstow and Margaret Wentworth, by whom he had two sons, Thomas Radcliffe, and Edward Radcliffe, 6th Earl of Sussex, and four daughters, Mary Radcliffe, who was a lady-in-waiting to Queen Elizabeth I, Frances Radcliffe, Elizabeth Radcliffe, and Martha Radcliffe.
- George Radcliffe, who married Katherine Marney, the daughter of John Marney, 2nd Baron Marney. After Radcliffe's death, his widow married Thomas Poynings, 1st Baron Poynings.

Secondly, by 1 September 1532, Sussex married Margaret Stanley, the only daughter of Thomas Stanley, 2nd Earl of Derby, and Anne Hastings, the daughter of Edward Hastings, 2nd Baron Hastings, by whom he had two daughters:

- Jane Radcliffe, who married Anthony Browne, 1st Viscount Montague.
- Anne Radcliffe, who married Thomas Wharton, 2nd Baron Wharton.

Thirdly on 14 January 1537 Sussex married Mary Arundell (died 20 October 1557), a daughter of Sir John Arundell (c. 1474 – 1545) of Lanherne St. Mawgan-in-Pyder, Cornwall, by his second wife, Katherine Grenvile. After Sussex's death on 27 November 1542, his widow Mary married, on 19 December 1545, as his second wife, Henry FitzAlan, Earl of Arundel (died 24 February 1580). There were no issue of the marriage. Sussex had by Mary Arundell two sons:

- A son baptized 22 March 1538 who died in infancy,
- Sir John Radcliffe (bap. 31 December 1539 – 9 November 1568) of Cleeve, Somerset, younger son.

== Notes ==
Peerage of England
New creation	Earl of Sussex; 1529–1542	Succeeded by Henry Radclyffe
New creation	Viscount FitzWalter; 1525–1542	Succeeded by Henry Radclyffe
Preceded by John Radcliffe	Baron FitzWalter; 1506–1542	Succeeded by Henry Radclyffe
