= Philip Howard, 13th Earl of Arundel =

English nobleman and Catholic saint (1557–1595)

The Right Honourable The Earl of Arundel
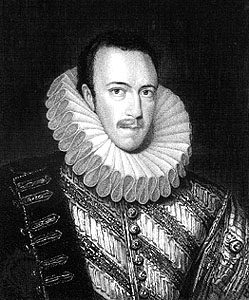
- Philip Howard, Earl of Arundel and English Catholic martyr
- Born: 28 June 1557; Strand, London, England
- Died: 19 October 1595 (aged 38); Tower of London, London
- Buried: Chapel of St Peter ad Vincula, Tower of London 1595 – 1624 Fitzalan Chapel, Arundel Castle 1624 – 1971 Arundel Cathedral 1971 to present.
- Noble family: Howard
- Spouse: Anne Dacre
- Issue: Thomas Howard, 14th Earl of Arundel
- Parents: Thomas Howard, 4th Duke of Norfolk; Lady Mary FitzAlan

Arms of Philip Howard from 1557 to 1572: Quarterly of 4: 1: Gules, on a bend between six cross-crosslets fitchy argent an escutcheon or charged with a demi-lion rampant pierced through the mouth by an arrow within a double tressure flory counterflory of the first (Howard, with augmentation of honor); 2: Gules, three lions passant guardant in pale or armed and langued azure a label of three points argent (Plantagenet, arms of Thomas of Brotherton, 1st Earl of Norfolk); 3: Chequy or and azure (de Warenne, Earl of Surrey); 4: Gules, a lion rampant golden, heraldry of the FitzAlan Family

Philip Howard, 13th Earl of Arundel (28 June 1557 – 19 October 1595) was an English nobleman. He was canonised by Pope Paul VI in 1970, as one of the Forty Martyrs of England and Wales. Howard lived mainly during the reign of Queen Elizabeth I. He was charged with being a Roman Catholic, quitting England without leave, and sharing in Jesuit plots. For this, he was sent to the Tower of London in 1585. Howard spent ten years in the Tower, until his death from dysentery.

== Early life ==
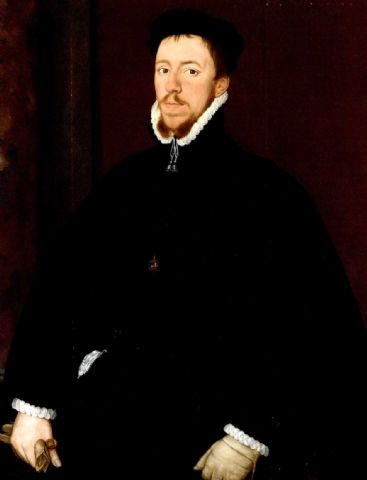
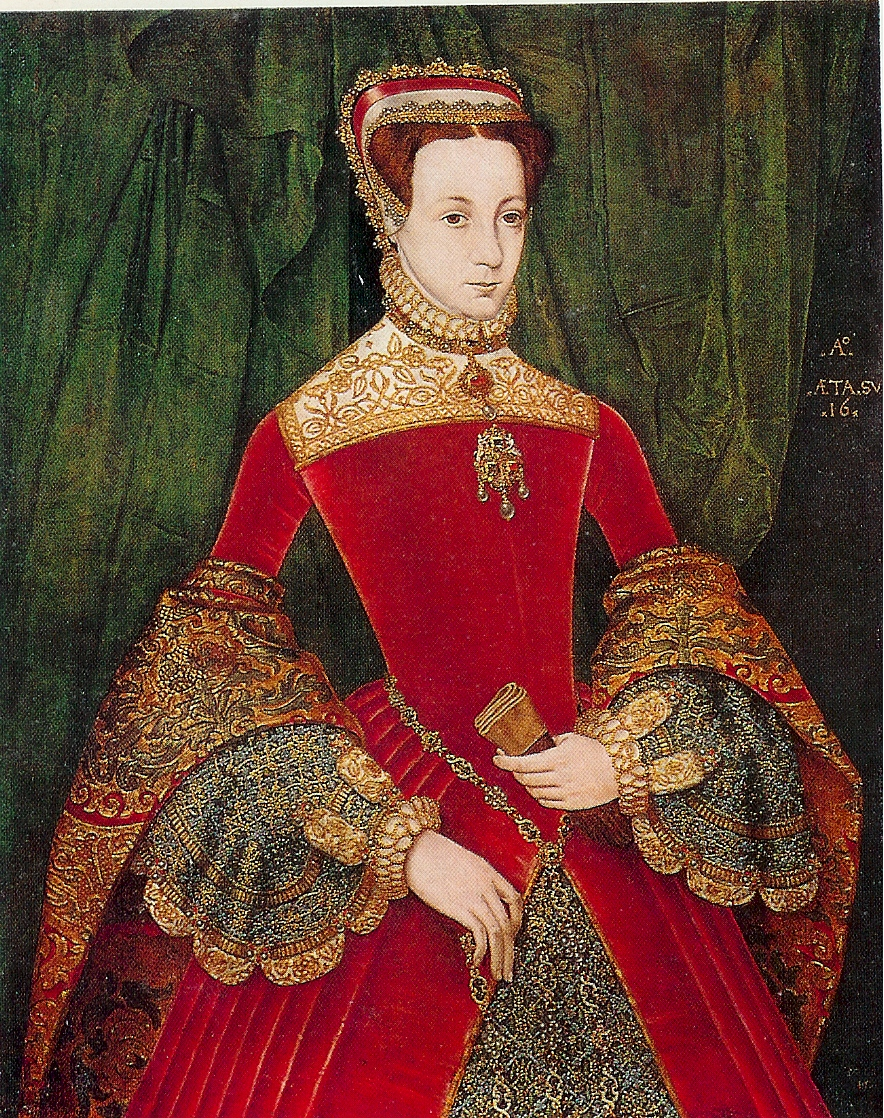
Thomas Howard, 4th Duke of Norfolk and Mary FitzAlan, Philip's parents

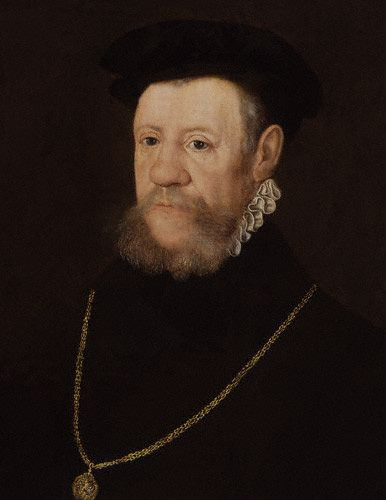
Henry FitzAlan, 12th Earl of Arundel, Philip's grandfather

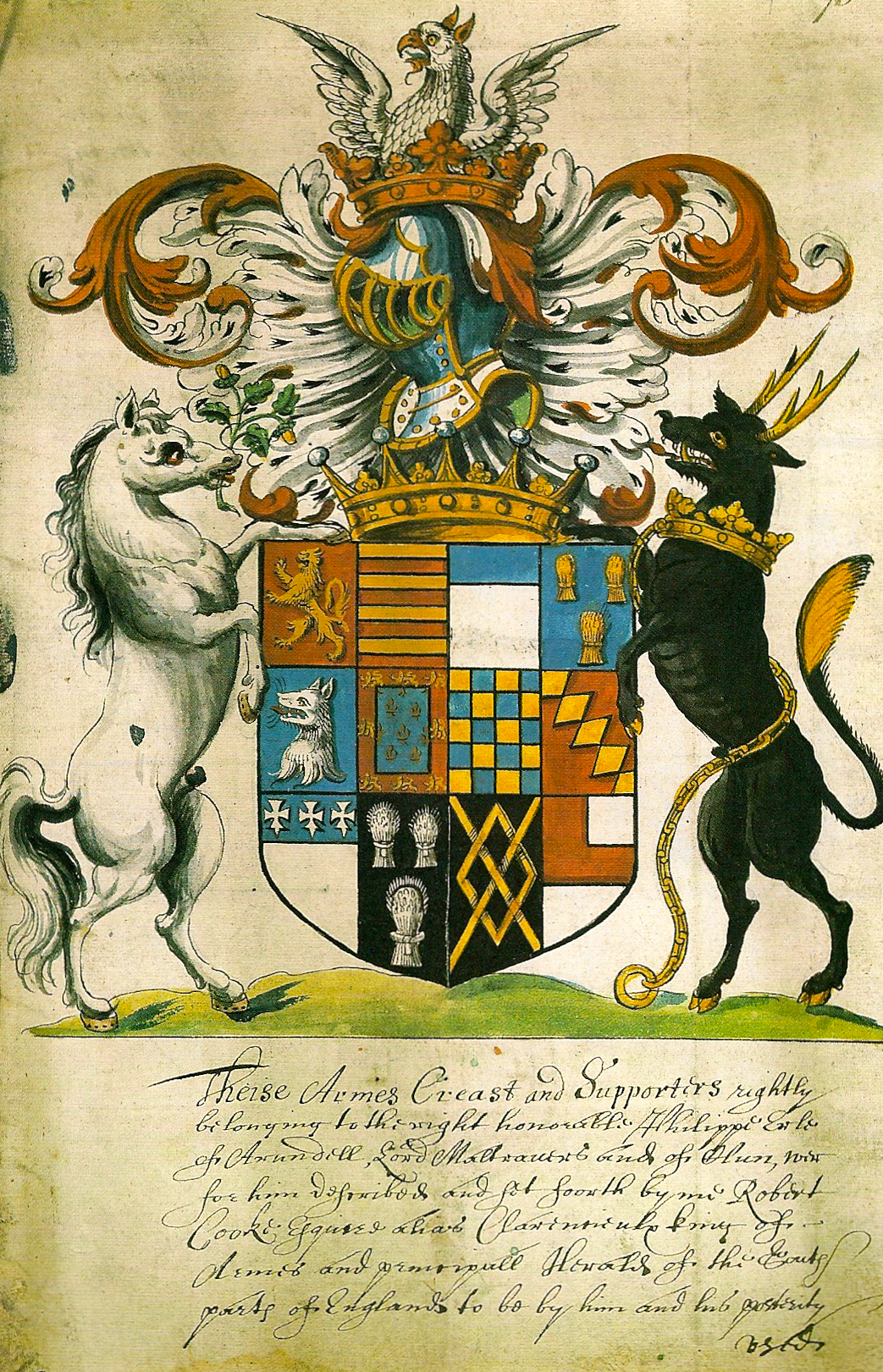
Confirmation of arms, crest and supporters, dated 28 May 1580, by Robert Cooke to Philip Howard, 13th Earl of Arundel, omitting Howard family coats of arms as the Dukedom of Norfolk was under attainder

Philip was born at Arundel House, in the Strand, London in 1557, during the upheaval of the English Reformation. He was the only son of Thomas Howard, 4th Duke of Norfolk by his first wife Lady Mary FitzAlan, the youngest daughter of Henry FitzAlan, 12th Earl of Arundel and his first wife, Lady Katherine Grey. He was baptised by the Lord Chancellor and Archbishop of York Nicholas Heath at Whitehall Palace with the royal family in attendance, and named after his co-godfather, King Philip II of Spain, husband of the ruling monarch, Mary I. The baby's other godfather was his grandfather, the 12th Earl of Arundel. His godmother was his great-grandmother, Elizabeth Stafford, widow of the 3rd Duke, who held the child over a gold baptismal font which was kept in the Treasury and normally used only for the baptism of royal children.

Shortly after his birth, his mother became seriously ill and died at Arundel House in August of that year. His mother's death was possibly the result to puerperal infection, a common illness that was caused by poor hygiene during childbirth. From the age of seven, Philip lived in a former Carthusian monastery. As the eldest son and heir to the Duke of Norfolk, he was destined to become the 5th Duke. From the moment of his birth, he bore the courtesy title of Earl of Surrey, a subsidiary title of the Dukes of Norfolk.

In 1569 his father arranged a marriage between Philip and his step-sister, Anne Dacre, the daughter of Norfolk's third wife, Elizabeth Leyburne, by the latter's previous marriage. Because both children were only 12 years old at the time, the ceremony was repeated two years later, after both parties had attained the age of consent. Philip's half-brothers Thomas and William, sons of their father by his second wife Margaret Audley, subsequently married Anne's sisters Mary and Elizabeth respectively.

Philip's father was a Roman Catholic with a Protestant education. in 1569 he was arrested for being involved in intrigues against Queen Elizabeth I, mainly because of the Duke's intention to marry Mary Stewart, Queen of Scots. Although he was released in August 1570, a few months later he became involved in the Ridolfi Plot to overthrow Elizabeth, install Mary on the English throne and restore Catholicism. In September 1571, when his participation in the plot was discovered, Norfolk was arrested again. In January 1572, he was tried for high treason, sentenced to death and executed in June of the same year, when Philip was almost fifteen years old. After his father's death, Philip and his surviving half-siblings Thomas, Margaret and William were left in the care of their uncle, Henry Howard, who also took charge of their education. During that time, the Howard children lived with their uncle at Audley End, one of his family's properties. As a result of his father's execution, the dukedom of Norfolk was forfeit, and Philip lost many of his paternal family's estates and the title of Earl of Surrey. Although Howard did not manage to recover the dukedom, a few years later he and his younger half-siblings were able to recover part of the forfeited properties.

During this time, Philip was sent to study at St John's College, Cambridge. While Howard was studying there, his wife came under the protection of Henry FitzAlan, 12th Earl of Arundel, Philip's maternal grandfather.

Philip graduated in 1574, when he was seventeen. He began to attend Elizabeth I's court by the time he turned eighteen just a few years after his father had been executed for treason against the Queen. His life at Cambridge had been frivolous and remained so at court, where, despite his troubled family past, he nevertheless became a favourite of the Queen.

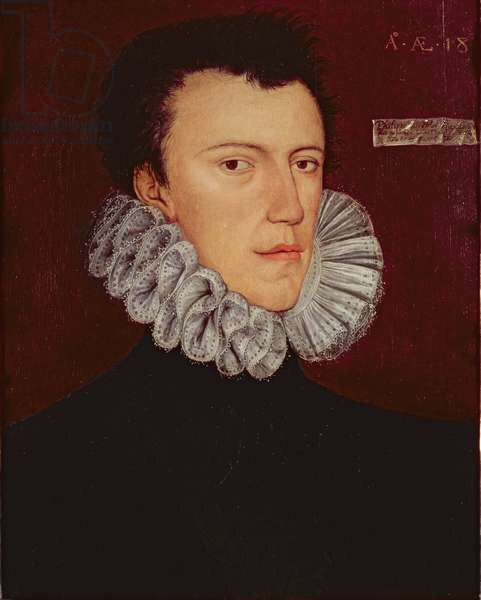
Philip Howard at 18 years of age by George Gower, c. 1575.

In July 1578, his maternal aunt, Jane FitzAlan, died without living descendants, as her three children from her marriage to John Lumley, 1st Baron Lumley had all died during infancy. On the death of his aunt, Philip became the sole surviving descendant of his maternal grandfather, and was heir to the earldom of Arundel and its subsidiary titles, and all of FitzAlan's extensive properties in Sussex. These included Arundel Castle, the main residence of the FitzAlan family, which later became the principal home of Philip's descendants. After his grandfather's death in February 1580, Howard received the entire inheritance of his maternal family, and the Queen made him Earl of Arundel. Since then, the Earldom of Arundel has remained linked to the senior line of the Howard family, and with the restoration of the Dukedom of Norfolk in 1660, the title became one of the Dukes' subsidiary (courtesy) titles.

Howard is variously numbered as 1st, 20th or 13th Earl of Arundel. This is due to forfeiture losses and subsequent recreations of the title. If taken in a continuous line from the creation of the Earldom in 1138 by King Stephen for William d'Aubigny (d.1176), Philip's direct ancestor, Howard, would be the 20th Earl.

== Received again into Catholic Church and later imprisonment ==
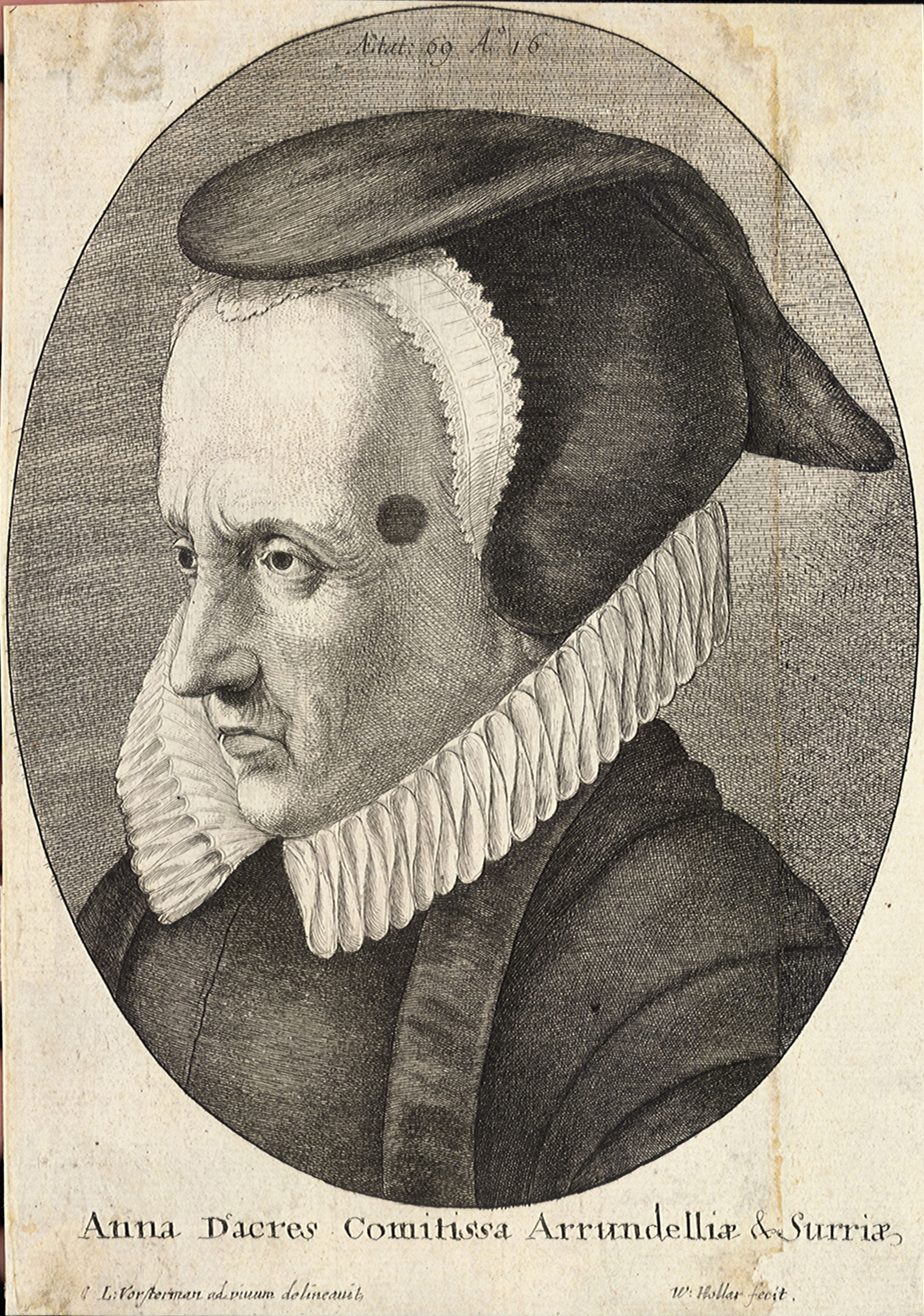
Anne Dacre, wife of Philip Howard

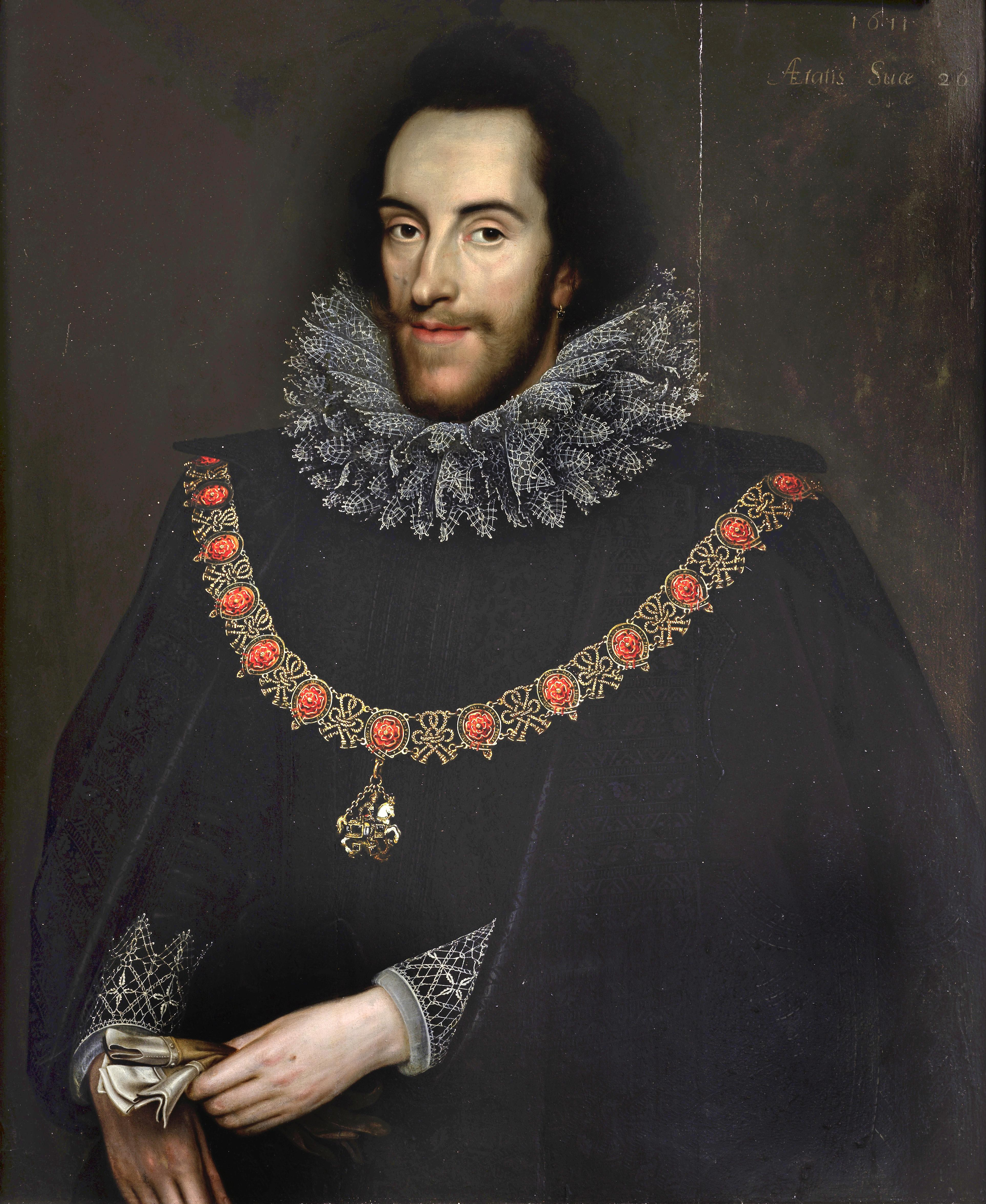
Thomas Howard, 14th Earl of Arundel, only son of Philip and Anne Dacre

In 1581, Philip was present at public disputations between Anglican theologians and the imprisoned Catholic priests Edmund Campion and Ralph Sherwin. Campion's vigorous defense of the faith while he was on trial for his life led Philip to return to Arundel to think about reconciliation with the Catholic Church, despite the dangers that would entail.

Philip was originally baptised as a Catholic and, although he received a Protestant education, Catholicism was never far below the surface, mostly because his close relations had remained loyal to the Catholic Church during the Reformation. His maternal grandfather was a staunch Catholic and his father, who had also been a Catholic educated as a Protestant, was disgraced for having conspired against Queen Elizabeth with the intention of replacing her with Mary, Queen of Scots and thus restore Catholicism in England. His paternal grandfather, the Earl of Surrey, also fell out of favour and was executed by Henry VIII, partly because he was a Catholic.

In 1583, the Earl was suspected of complicity in the Throckmorton Plot. He prepared to escape to the Spanish Netherlands, but his plans were interrupted by a visit from Elizabeth to his house in London; she ordered him to confine himself there.

The same year, the Countess of Arundel, without her husband's knowledge and in great fear of his displeasure, secretly returned to the illegal and underground Catholic Church in England. After much effort, she successfully regained her husband's affection.

On 30 September 1584, the Earl was secretly received again into the Catholic Church by the Jesuit priest, Father William Weston. At the same time, the Earl's younger half-brother, Lord William Howard, was also received into Catholicism. While still attending Elizabeth's court, Arundel successfully hid his adherence to Catholicism for a time, before withdrawing to his home and attempting to focus on being a better husband and father. The next year, Howard acted against Father Weston's cautions and attempted to flee to mainland Europe in order to live openly as a Catholic with his wife and children.

His flight abroad was recommended and planned, and later betrayed to Sir Francis Walsingham, by a trusted servant, whom Father Philip Caraman identifies as the Earl's chaplain, underground Catholic priest and agent provocateur Father Edward Grately. Although many other recusants had been able to flee England successfully, the Earl of Arundel, through his kinship to the late Anne Boleyn, was a second cousin once removed of the Queen and was widely considered by persecuted Catholics who were plotting regime change to be a possible heir presumptive to the English throne. On setting sail from Littlehampton, therefore, the Earl's ship was attacked and boarded by English pirates working for the Tudor Navy. The Earl was at first led to believe that the pirate captain only wanted to extort a ransom but, instead, he was arrested and committed to the Tower of London on 25 April 1585.

He was charged before the Star Chamber with being a Catholic, quitting England without leave, sharing in Jesuit plots and claiming the title Duke of Norfolk in defiance of his father's attainder. On 17 May 1586, he was fined £10,000 and sentenced to imprisonment at the Queen's pleasure. In July 1586 he was offered his freedom if he would carry the sword of state before the Queen to church; he refused. In 1588 he was accused of praying, together with other Catholics, for the victory of the Spanish Armada. He was tried for high treason on 14 April 1589 and found guilty. He was immediately condemned to death and attainted, with all his titles and property declared forfeit to the Crown.

In a letter to Claudio Aquaviva, dated 1 May 1589, Father Henry Garnet recalled:

When the sentence was pronounced and the crowd saw the Earl coming out of the hall with the axe-edge turned in towards him. Bear in mind in the trial of nobles this is the sign that the prisoner has been condemned. All of a sudden, there was a great uproar that was carried miles along the river bank. It was reported that some people demanded an answer, to the following question: what had come of the Queen's clemency that such a splendid and gallant gentleman should suffer condemnation? Other people were passionately indignant that a man who had prayed to God should be executed for the act of Catholic prayer alone. Amongst the accusations brought against him, and the principal charge, indeed, the one on which the whole case turned, was this: he had asked a certain priest to pray for the success of the Spanish fleet. Whereas, in fact, all his enemies could prove is that he stated that prayers should be given every day and night in the Tower of London and in other prisons at that time. This was a time of fundamental persecution [of Catholics] when everyone was expecting a general massacre of all people who followed the religion .

Queen Elizabeth did not sign his death warrant but Howard was never told this. He was kept constantly in fear of execution, although comforted by the companionship of a dog, which served as a go-between by which Howard and other prisoners, most notably the priest Robert Southwell, could smuggle messages to each other. Although these two men never met, Howard's dog helped them to deepen their friendship and exchange encouragement during their plight. Philip Howard loved his pet, which is commemorated, with him, in a statue at Arundel Cathedral.

One day Howard scratched into a wall of his cell words that are still visible today: Latin: Quanto plus afflictiones pro Christo in hoc saeculo, tanto plus gloriae cum Christo in futuro. The English translation is: The more affliction [we endure] for Christ in this world, the more glory [we shall obtain] with Christ in the next (cf. Romans, chapter 8). The same phrase can be found today on one of the steps of Howard's shrine in Arundel.

Each day he spent several hours in prayer and meditation; he was noted for his patience in suffering and courtesy to unkind keepers.

Howard spent more than ten years in the Tower. Father Weston later recalled:

While he was enduring these cruel sufferings an offer of liberation was made him in the Queen's name, but on condition that he held a disputation with the so-called Archbishop of Canterbury. This he refused to do. He preferred to be afflicted in the company of God's people than to possess the passing pleasures of temporal freedom. Indeed, he reckoned persecution a greater happiness than the frail and shallow satisfaction of worldly well-being.

== Death and burial ==
During the autumn of 1595, while dying of dysentery, the Earl petitioned the Queen to be allowed to see his wife and his son, who had been born after his imprisonment. The Queen responded, 'If he will but once attend the Protestant Service, he shall not only see his wife and children, but be restored to his honours and estates with every mark of my royal favour'. To this, Howard is said to have replied: 'Tell Her Majesty if my religion be the cause for which I suffer, sorry I am that I have but one life to lose'. He remained in the Tower, never to see his wife or son again, and died alone on Sunday 19 October 1595.

Father Weston later recalled:

There were some who thought he was carried off by poison. I, however, made careful inquiries of a certain Catholic who had served him as a page at that time in the Tower, but I was never able to get any confirmation of this. As he lay dying he bequeathed to me the breviary which he used: but Father Garnet decided to keep it himself for posterity like some religious object. He did not dare to entrust it to me, for everything I had was likely to be seized at any moment, and he did not think it right to expose to such manifold risk a possession which, he declared, was more precious than gold.

According to Father Philip Caraman, Garnet also kept the breviary which Robert Southwell had used in the Tower of London. Both, however, were lost in a raid by priest hunters on Garnet's London safe house.

Howard was buried beneath the floor of the church of St Peter ad Vincula, inside the walls of the Tower, where his father's remains also lay. The Earl's funeral and burial, according to Father Caraman, 'cost his frugal Sovereign two pounds'.

After being widowed, the Countess of Arundel took a vow of chastity and never remarried. She spent her remaining days writing Christian poetry, attending mass, and making other religious observances. She had a passion for helping those in need, especially the sick.

In 1624, the dowager Countess and their son obtained permission from King James I to move Howard's remains, first to the residence of the dowager Countess at West Horsley, Surrey, and finally to the Fitzalan Chapel at Arundel Castle in Sussex.

The Dowager Countess, at the age of 73, died of natural causes on 19 April 1630 at Shifnal Manor, Shropshire and was buried next to her husband inside the Fitzalan Chapel.

Even though Howard had been attainted at his trial in 1589, in 1603, shortly after the accession of the Scottish king James VI and I to the English throne and thanks to the intercession of Philip's uncle, the Earl of Northampton, Thomas Howard, Lord Maltravers, Arundel's son, was able to regain royal favour. In 1604, Thomas recovered the earldom of Arundel and its estates.

== Legacy ==
Saint Philip Howard
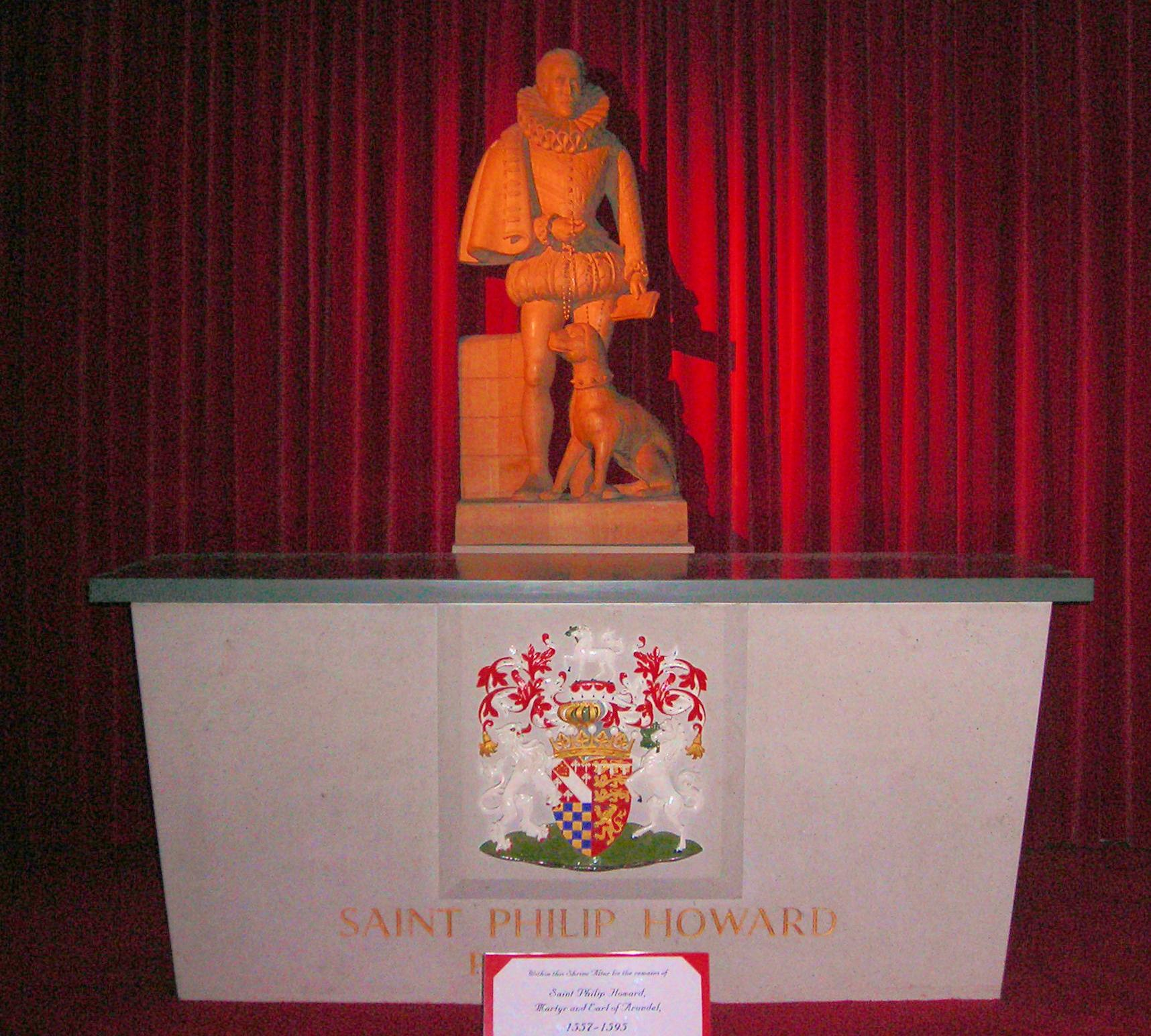
- Shrine of St Philip Howard

Martyr
- Born: 28 June 1557; Strand, London
- Died: 19 October 1595 (aged 38); Tower of London, London, England
- Venerated in: Catholic Church
- Beatified: 15 December 1929 by Pope Pius XI
- Canonized: 25 October 1970 by Pope Paul VI
- Major shrine: The Cathedral Church of Our Lady and St. Philip Howard (Arundel Cathedral)
- Feast: 19 October, 25 October
- Patronage: Diocese of Arundel and Brighton

With Our Lady of the Assumption, St. Philip Howard is co-patron of the Roman Catholic Diocese of Arundel and Brighton. Arundel Cathedral, originally dedicated to St. Philip Neri, was commissioned by the 15th Duke of Norfolk in 1868. It was elevated to the status of a cathedral in 1965 and, shortly after Pope Paul VI canonised the Earl as one of the Forty Martyrs of England and Wales in October 1970, its dedication was changed to Our Lady and Saint Philip Howard. On 10 March 1971, in the presence of Monsignor Michael Bowen, then Coadjutor bishop of Arundel and Brighton, and the Chapter of Canons, Howard's remains were moved from the Fitzalan Chapel to the new shrine erected in the cathedral, where the consecration ceremony was held. Since then, the shrine has become a place of pilgrimage.

While imprisoned, Howard spent much of his time writing and translating Catholic poetry and devotional literature. The manuscripts, according to Father Caraman, were routinely smuggled out of the Tower of London to be edited and corrected by Father William Weston before, in at least one case, being smuggled to the Spanish Netherlands for publication by exiled English recusant Richard Verstegan.

One example was the Earl's Latin-Elizabethan English translation of An Epistle in the Person of Jesus Christ to the Faithful Soule by John Justus of Landsberg, which was posthumously published at Antwerp (1595, reprinted 1871). Howard's verse translation of Marko Marulić's poem Carmen de doctrina Domini nostri Iesu Christi pendentis in cruce ('A Dialogue Betwixt a Christian and Christ Hanging on the Crosse), served in lieu of an introduction in the Antwerp edition. Howard's poetry translation of Marulić was published again, with updated English orthography, in the March/April 2022 issue of the Traditionalist Catholic literary magazine, St. Austin Review.

Howard also authored three manuscript treatises On the Excellence and Utility of Virtue.

Further detailed research about the Earl's life, as well as several of his works of Christian poetry, were collected by the poet Louise Imogen Guiney and published as part of her 1939 collection The Recusant Poets.

== See also ==
- Howard's great-grandson, also named Philip Howard, a Catholic cardinal.

== Sources ==
- Brennan, Malcolm (1991). Martyrs of the English Reformation. Kansas City: Angelus Press. ISBN 978-0-935952-85-8. OCLC 981438995.
- Sigrid Undset, Stages on the Road (copyright 1934)
- Profile, HistoryOrb.com. Accessed 1 December 2022.
- Dewald, J.; Beik, W.; Blanning, T.C.W.; Feeney, D.; Hinds, S.; Simms, B. (1996). The European Nobility, 1400-1800. New Approaches to European History. Cambridge University Press. ISBN 978-0-521-42528-5.

Peerage of England
Preceded by Henry Fitzalan	Earl of Arundel; Baron Maltravers; 1580–1595	Succeeded by Thomas Howard
