= Thomas Fitzalan, 10th Earl of Arundel =

English noble

Thomas FitzAlan
- Earl of Arundel; Baron Maltravers
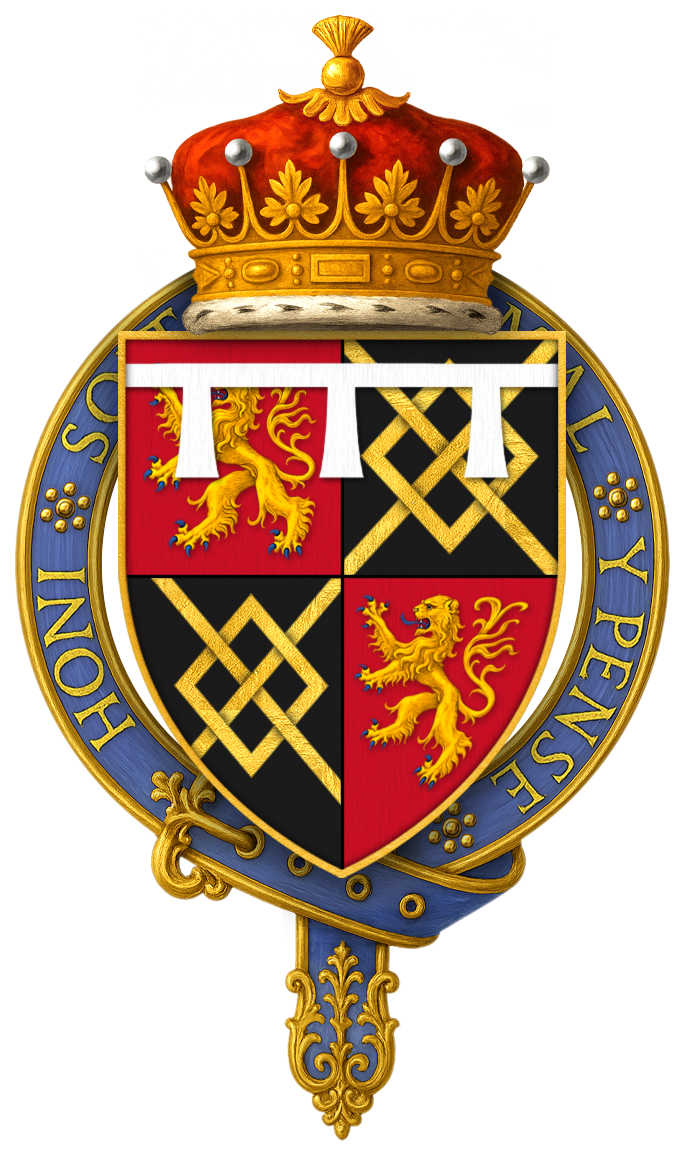
- Arms of Sir Thomas Fitzalan, 10th Earl of Arundel, KG: FitzAlan quartering Maltravers, with a label of three points argent for the difference of an eldest son.
- Born: 1450
- Died: 25 October 1524 (aged 73/74); Singleton, West Sussex
- Buried: Arundel, Sussex
- Spouse: Margaret Woodville
- Issue: William Fitzalan, 11th Earl of Arundel; Edward Fitzalan; Margaret de la Pole, Countess of Lincoln; Joan Fitzalan
- Father: William Fitzalan, 9th Earl of Arundel
- Mother: Joan Neville

Thomas Fitzalan otherwise Arundel, 10th Earl of Arundel, 7th Baron Maltravers (1450 – 25 October 1524) was the son of William Fitzalan, 9th Earl of Arundel, and Joan Neville, eldest daughter of Richard Neville, 5th Earl of Salisbury, and Alice Montagu, suo jure Countess of Salisbury. By his mother, he was a nephew of Warwick, the Kingmaker.

== Career ==
He was created a Knight of the Bath on 27 June 1461 at the coronation of Edward IV, and was elected to the Order of the Garter on 26 February 1474. As Lord Maltravers, he was one of the peers present at the coronation of Richard III on 6 July 1483, and in 1471 sat in Parliament as Lord Maltravers. In September 1486 he was godfather to Henry VII's elder son, Arthur, Prince of Wales, and on 25 November 1487 bore the Rod and Dove at the coronation of Elizabeth of York. He succeeded his father as Earl of Arundel in 1488. He was twice elected Lieutenant of the Order of the Garter, on 19 July 1489, and again in 1517. In 1489 he was appointed Warden of the New Forest. He was present, with all the other Garter Knights, at the meeting in 1520 between Henry VIII and Francis I of France now known as the Field of the Cloth of Gold.

He died on 25 October 1524 at Downly Park in Singleton, Sussex, aged 74, and was buried with his wife at the collegiate church at Arundel. His will, dated 12 October 1524, was proved on 29 November of that year.

== Marriage and issue ==
He married, shortly before 17 February 1466, Margaret Woodville (died before 4 August 1492), seventh daughter of Richard Woodville, 1st Earl Rivers, and Jacquetta of Luxemburg, and was a younger sister of Elizabeth Woodville, wife of Edward IV.Thomas and Margaret had two sons and two daughters:

- William Fitzalan, 11th Earl of Arundel.
- Edward Fitzalan.
- Margaret Fitzalan, who married John de la Pole, 1st Earl of Lincoln.
- Joan Fitzalan (died 14 November 1508), who married George Neville, 5th Baron Bergavenny. According to Hawkyard, the marriage was childless; however according to Richardson, there were two daughters of the marriage, Elizabeth Neville, who married Henry Daubeney, 1st Earl of Bridgewater, and Jane Neville, who married Henry Pole, 1st Baron Montagu.

== Notes ==
Peerage of England
Preceded by William FitzAlan	Earl of Arundel; 1487–1524	Succeeded by William FitzAlan
Preceded by William FitzAlan	Baron Maltravers (writ of acceleration); 1482–1524	Succeeded by William FitzAlan
