= William Fitzalan, 11th Earl of Arundel =

English peer

Sir William Fitzalan
- Earl of Arundel
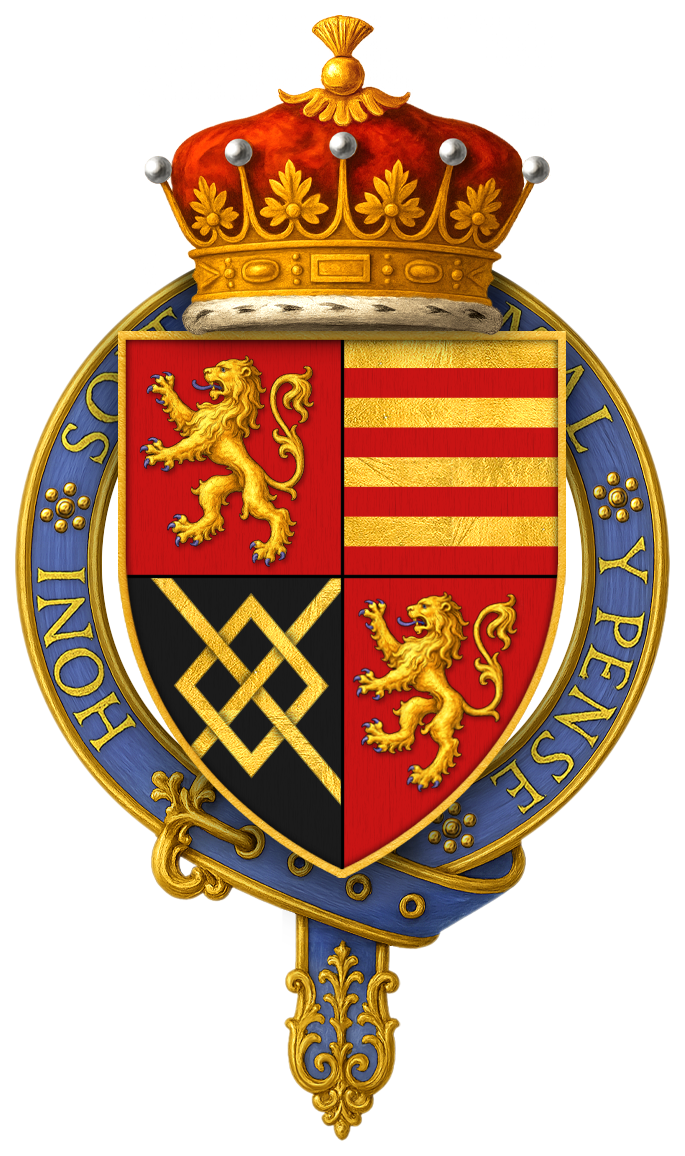
- Arms of Sir William Fitzalan, 11th Earl of Arundel, KG
- Tenure: 1524–1544
- Predecessor: Thomas Fitzalan
- Successor: Henry Fitzalan
- Born: 1476
- Died: 23 January 1544 (aged 67–68)
- Residence: Arundel, West Sussex, England
- Offices: Lord Chamberlain
- Spouses: Elizabeth Willoughby; Anne Percy
- Issue: Henry Fitzalan
- Parents: Thomas Fitzalan; Margaret Woodville

William Fitzalan, 11th Earl of Arundel, 8th Baron Maltravers KG (1476 – 23 January 1544) was an English peer, styled as Lord Maltravers from 1487 to 1524.

FitzAlan was the son of Thomas Fitzalan, 10th Earl of Arundel, and Margaret Woodville (died before 6 March 1490), daughter of Richard Woodville, 1st Earl Rivers, and a younger sister of Elizabeth Woodville, wife of Edward IV.

He married firstly, after 1501, Elizabeth Willoughby, daughter of Robert Willoughby, 1st Baron Willoughby de Broke, and secondly, on 15 February 1510, he married Lady Anne Percy, a daughter of Henry Percy, 4th Earl of Northumberland. He succeeded to the title of 11th Earl of Arundel on the death of his father Thomas in 1524 and became Lord Chamberlain in 1526.

FitzAlan bore the Sceptre with the Dove at the coronation of Anne Boleyn in 1533 and later took part in her trial in 1536. During the dissolution of the monasteries he was given large areas of land in Sussex, including Michelham Priory. He died in 1544 and was buried at Arundel Castle.

His only son was Henry Fitzalan, 12th Earl of Arundel.

== Footnotes ==
Political offices
Preceded by The Earl of Worcester	Lord Chamberlain; 1526–1530	Succeeded by The Lord Sandys of the Vyne
Peerage of England
Preceded by Thomas Fitzalan	Earl of Arundel; 1524–1544	Succeeded by Henry Fitzalan
Preceded by Thomas Fitzalan	Baron Maltravers (descended by acceleration); 1524–1533	Succeeded by Henry Fitzalan
