= Thomas Wharton, 2nd Baron Wharton =

Member of the Parliament of England

- Born: 1520
- Died: 1572 (aged 51–52)
- Spouse: Anne Radcliffe
- Issue: 2 sons, 3 daughters
- Father: Thomas Wharton, 1st Baron Wharton
- Mother: Eleanor Stapleton

Thomas Wharton, 2nd Baron Wharton (1520–1572), of Wharton and Nateby, Westmoreland, Beaulieu alias New Hall, Essex and Westminster, Middlesex, was an English peer.

== Family ==
Wharton was the eldest son of Thomas Wharton, 1st Baron Wharton, by his first wife, Eleanor, the daughter of Sir Brian Stapleton of Wighill, Yorkshire. After his mother's death, his father married, on 18 November 1561, Anne Talbot, widow of John Braye, 2nd Baron Braye, and daughter of Francis Talbot, 5th Earl of Shrewsbury.

== Career ==
Wharton was knighted in 1545 by Edward Seymour, 1st Earl of Hertford, and in May 1547 married Anne Radcliffe, the younger daughter of Robert Radcliffe, 1st Earl of Sussex, by his second wife, Margaret Stanley, the daughter of Thomas Stanley, 2nd Earl of Derby.

Wharton was a companion of Queen Mary I. He was with her at Kenninghall when young Edward VI died and Lady Jane Grey ascended the throne for nine days. He accompanied Mary to Framlingham Castle and, upon her accession, to the Tower of London. He was named Master of the Henchmen and a member of the Privy Council, and Mary's husband Philip II of Spain gave him a pension.

He served as High Sheriff of Cumberland for 1547 and as MP for Cumberland in 1544–1545, 1547, and 1553, for Hedon, Yorkshire in 1554, for Northumberland in 1555, and again for that county as well as for Yorkshire in the parliament of 1557–1558.

Being a devout Catholic and supporter of Mary, she had him retained, through personal letters, in Parliament and granted him the stewardship and keepership of the manor of Beaulieu alias Newhall at Boreham, Essex, and a house in London on Canon Row in Westminster.

Wharton was a Member (MP) of the Parliament of England for Cumberland 1542, 1545, 1547 and October 1553; for Hedon April 1554, Yorkshire November 1554; Northumberland 1555 and 1558.

When Mary died and Elizabeth I became queen, Thomas was excluded from Parliament and retired to Newhall. The register of burials at Boreham includes his daughter Catherine Wharton (April 1560) and "Ladi Ann Wharton" (June 1561).

He continued to celebrate the Mass, and was eventually imprisoned in the Tower of London in 1561. During the time of his imprisonment his wife died in June 1561.

Seven years later he inherited the title of Baron which he held for four years.

Wharton died on 14 June 1572 at his house on Canon Row, and was buried in Westminster Abbey.

== Marriage and family ==
Thomas Wharton married Anne Radcliffe, a daughter of Robert Radcliffe, 1st Earl of Sussex. Their children included:

- Philip Wharton, 3rd Baron Wharton
- Thomas Wharton
- Catherine Wharton, died at Boreham in 1560.
- Anne Wharton.

== Footnotes ==
Peerage of England
Preceded by Thomas Wharton	Baron Wharton; 1568–1572	Succeeded by Philip Wharton
