= Henry Fitzalan, 12th Earl of Arundel =

English nobleman and courtier (1512–1580)

The Right Honourable The Earl of Arundel KG PC
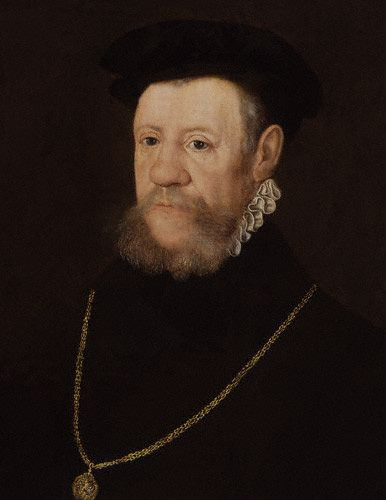
- Henry Fitzalan, 12th Earl of Arundel, in a portrait from the 1560s.

Lord Lieutenant of Sussex
- In office 1559–1561
- Succeeded by: The Lord Lumley

Chancellor of the University of Oxford
- In office 1558–1559
- Preceded by: Reginald Pole
- Succeeded by: John Mason

Lord Chamberlain
- In office 1546–1550
- Preceded by: Lord St. John
- Succeeded by: The Lord Wentworth

Personal details
- Born: 23 April 1512
- Died: 24 February 1580 (aged 67)
- Spouse(s): Katherine Grey Mary Arundell (m. 1545; died 1557)
- Children: Henry Fitzalan; Jane FitzAlan; Mary FitzAlan
- Parents: William Fitzalan, 11th Earl of Arundel (father); Anne Percy (mother)

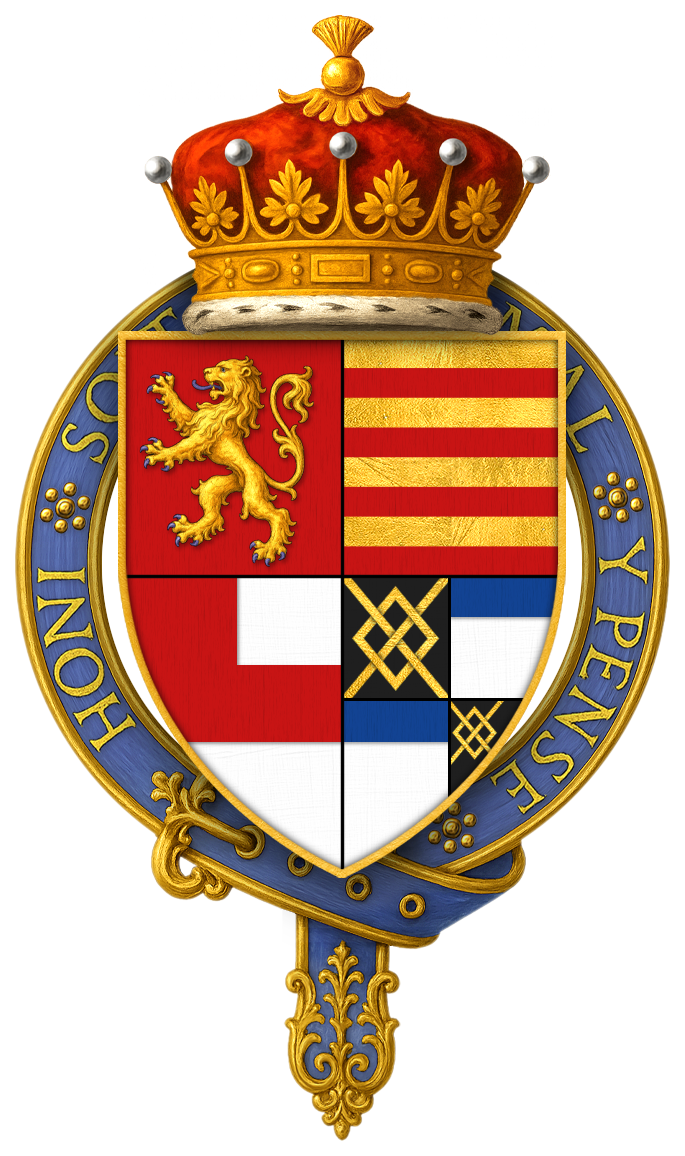
Arms of Sir Henry Fitzalan, 12th Earl of Arundel, KG

Henry Fitzalan, 12th Earl of Arundel (23 April 1512 – 24 February 1580) was an English nobleman, who over his long life assumed a prominent place at the court of all the later Tudor sovereigns.

== Court career under Henry VIII ==
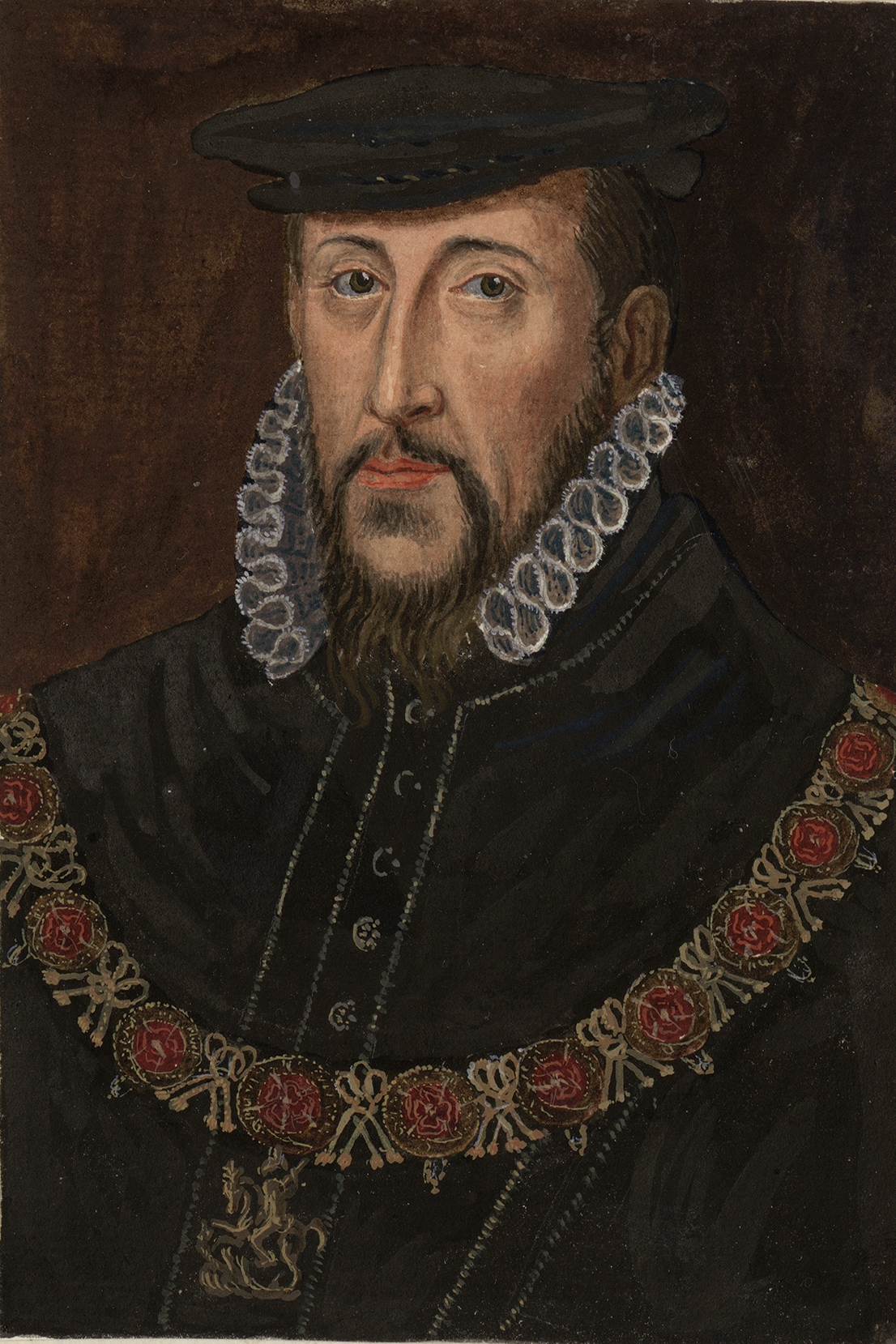
Henry FitzAlan, 18th century

He was the only son of William Fitzalan, 11th Earl of Arundel, and his second wife Anne Percy, daughter of Henry Percy, 4th Earl of Northumberland, and was named for Henry VIII, who personally stood as his godfather at his baptism.

At 15, Henry Fitzalan became a page at the court of King Henry VIII, attending the king to Calais in 1532. When he came of age, in 1533, he was summoned to Parliament as Lord Maltravers, a subsidiary title of his father, who was still alive. He attended the trials of Anne Boleyn and her alleged lover Lord Rochford in May 1536.

In 1540 he was appointed deputy of Calais. He remained there, improving the fortifications at his own expense, until his father's death in early 1544. He returned to England to assume the earldom, and was made a Knight of the Garter. War with France soon brought him back to the continent, where he spent much of 1544. He then returned to England, where the king appointed him Lord Chamberlain.

== Edward VI ==
After King Henry's death in 1547, the Earl was Earl Marshal acted as Edward VI's coronation. He continued as Lord Chamberlain, and in addition, by the terms of Henry's will, was designated one of the council of 12 assistant executors. Under the new King's uncle, Lord Protector Edward Seymour, 1st Duke of Somerset, Arundel's influence diminished, and he soon became an advocate of Somerset's removal.

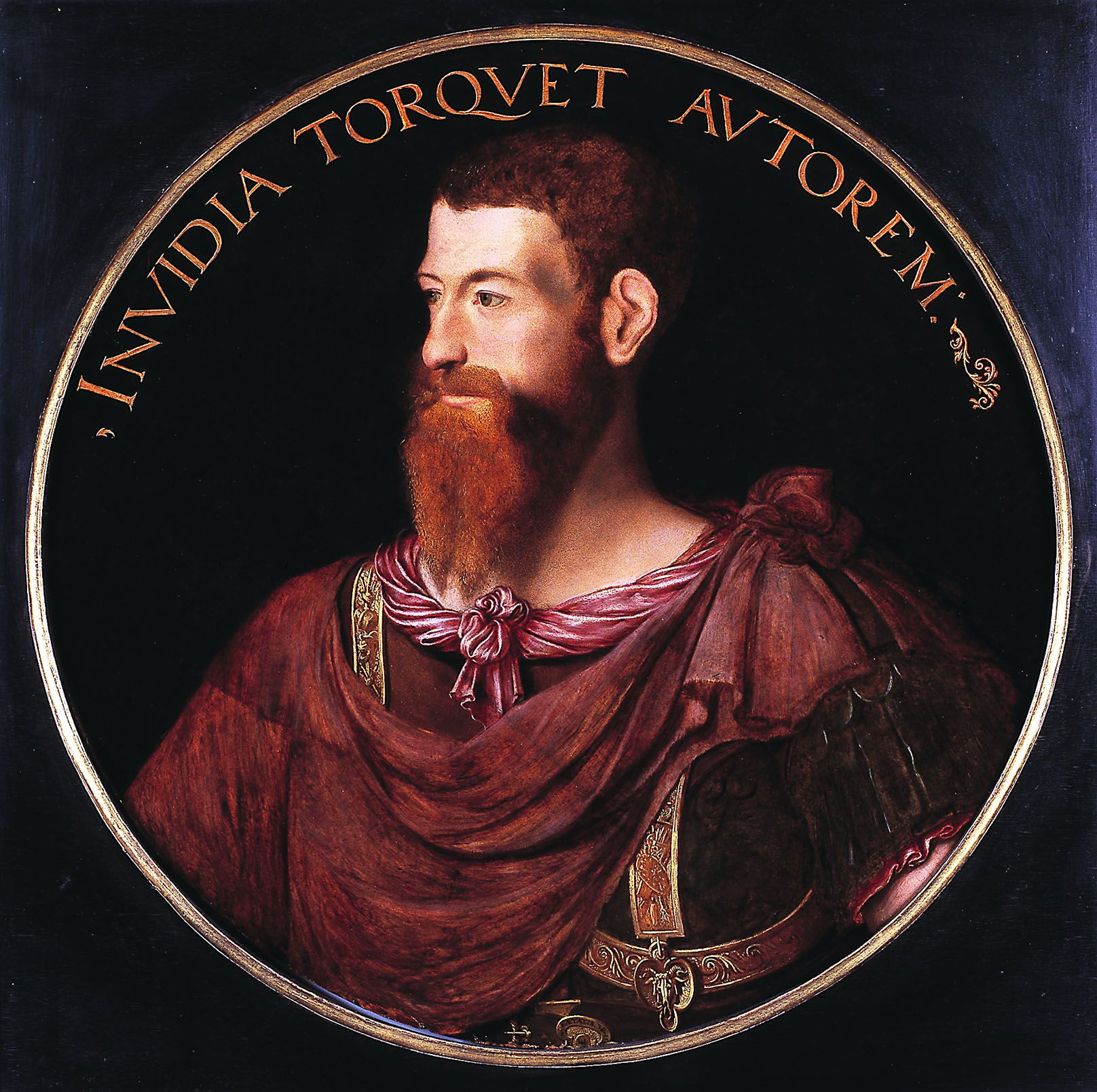
Henry Fitzalan, 12th Earl of Arundel, dressed as a Roman Emperor, by Hans Eworth, 1550.

Somerset was deposed and sent to the Tower of London in October 1549, with Arundel, Thomas Wriothesley, 1st Earl of Southampton, and John Dudley, Earl of Warwick (later Duke of Northumberland) among the leaders of the new governing group. In early 1550 Warwick removed Arundel and Southampton, who were religious conservatives, from office. Arundel was placed under house arrest under dubious charges of peculation. He was also fined £12,000, £8,000 of which was later remitted. Within a few months, he was cleared of the charges, but the experience pushed him into the camp of the Duke of Somerset, who had been released from the Tower and readmitted to the Privy Council. When Somerset was again arrested in 1551, Arundel was implicated in some of his plots, and was himself arrested and imprisoned for a year. He was eventually pardoned, again heavily fined, and returned to his place on the Council in May 1553.

== Intrigues and position under Mary I ==
King Edward's health was seriously declining, and on 21 June 1553 Arundel was among those who signed Edward's letters patent which conferred the succession on Lady Jane Grey. After the King's death, and after Northumberland had left London, however, together with the Earl of Pembroke, he worked for the proclamation of Mary I on 19 July 1553. Arundel tricked Northumberland into attacking Mary, then called an assembly of the leaders of the city, denounced Northumberland, and had Mary proclaimed queen. Taking the great seal and a letter of submission by the Council, he then rode off to Framlingham, where Mary was staying. He then secured Northumberland in Cambridge, and returned to London with Mary.

At Mary's coronation, Arundel was for the second time High Constable, and was then appointed Lord Steward of the royal household. He served in various roles in her court, being, for example, one of the nobles who received her husband Philip II of Spain when he landed at Southampton. Later, he presided over the trial of his brother-in-law, Henry Grey, 1st Duke of Suffolk, assisted in suppressing Wyatt's rebellion in 1554, was dispatched on foreign missions, and in September 1555 accompanied Philip to Brussels. The same year he and others received a charter under the name of Company of Merchant Adventurers to New Lands, for the discovery of unknown lands, and was made high steward of the University of Oxford, being chosen chancellor in 1559, but resigning his office in the same year. In 1557, on the prospect of a war with France, he was appointed lieutenant-general of the forces for the defence of the country, and in 1558 attended the conference for the negotiation of peace. He returned to England on the death of Mary in November 1558.

In 1555 he promoted the marriage of his daughter Mary to 4th Duke of Norfolk. Mary died in August 1557, but shortly before she died she gave birth to her only son, Philip Howard, who would later become Henry's sole heir.

In 1556, Mary I sold the unfinished Nonsuch Palace that had been designed and built by her father and predecessor, King Henry VIII, to Arundel, who completed it by 1559. In 1585, the Treaty of Nonsuch was signed by Elizabeth I of England and the Dutch Republic at the palace. After Arundel's death in 1580, his son-in-law, John Lumley, 1st Baron Lumley, sold the palace back to Elizabeth I and the Crown in 1590–1592, in exchange for lands valued at £534. Elizabeth I continued to use Nonsuch Palace as a royal residence until her death in 1603, whereupon her successor, James I and VI of England and Scotland, inherited it.

== Positions under Elizabeth I ==
Although Elizabeth I did not trust him, he was too powerful to be slighted or ignored, and so he was retained in his various offices when she ascended the throne. For the third time, he had a high place at a royal coronation. However, as a Roman Catholic, he opposed the arrest of his co-religionists and the war with Scotland. He incurred the queen's displeasure in 1562 by holding a meeting at his house during her illness to consider the question of succession and promote the claims of Lady Katherine Grey. In 1564, being suspected of intrigues against the government, he was dismissed from the lord-stewardship and confined to his house, but was restored to favour in December.

In March 1566 he went to Padua, but being summoned back by the queen he returned to London on the 17th of April 1567. The following year he served on the commission of inquiry into the charges against Mary, Queen of Scots. He made use of an international incident in 1568 as a means of effecting William Cecil's overthrow, and urged upon the Spanish government the stoppage of trade.

In January he alarmed Elizabeth by communicating to her a supposed Spanish project for aiding Mary and replacing her on her throne, and put before the queen in writing his own objections to the adoption of extreme measures against her. In September, on the discovery of Norfolk's plot, he was arrested, but not having committed himself sufficiently to incur the charge of treason in the rebellion he escaped punishment, was released in March 1570, and was recalled by Robert Dudley to the council with the aim of embarrassing Cecil. He again renewed his intrigues, which were at length to some extent exposed by the discovery of the Ridolfi plot in September 1571. He was once more arrested, and not liberated till December 1572 after Norfolk's execution.

In June 1578 his daughter, Jane died without living descendants, as her only three children from her marriage to John Lumley, 1st Baron Lumley all died in infancy. With the death of his daughter Jane, his grandson Philip Howard, son of his daughter Mary, was left as his only surviving descendant and thus became the heir to the Earldom of Arundel and the entirety of the vast estates Henry owned in Sussex, including Arundel Castle.

Henry died on 24 February 1580 and was buried in the Fitzalan Chapel of Arundel Castle, where a monument was erected to his memory.

Coaches were introduced into England from France by Henry Fitzalan, who travelled widely on the Continent in the mid-1560s.

== Marriage and children ==
Henry Fitzalan, 12th Earl of Arundel, was first married to Lady Katherine Grey, daughter of Thomas Grey, 2nd Marquess of Dorset, and Margaret Wotton. By her, he had three children:

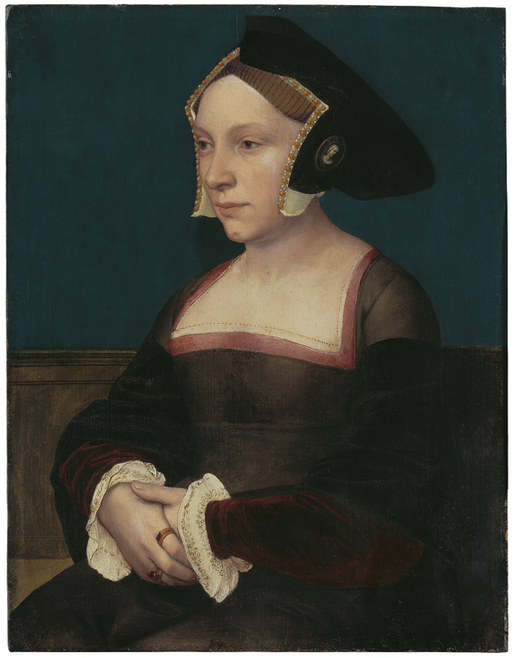
Katherine Grey, Lady Maltravers, 1530s

- Lady Jane FitzAlan (1537–1576/7), who married John Lumley, 1st Baron Lumley
- Henry Fitzalan, Lord Maltravers (1538–1556), died young
- Lady Mary FitzAlan (1540–1557), who married Thomas Howard, 4th Duke of Norfolk, and whose son Philip, eventually inherited the Earldom of Arundel.

It is by said marriage that Arundel was the brother-in-law of Henry Grey, Duke of Suffolk, father of Lady Jane Grey.

Henry Grey, then the 3rd Marquess of Dorset, had been betrothed to Henry Fitzalan, 12th Earl of Arundel's sister, also named Katherine, but refused the match. The plan had been to make them double brothers-in-law. Instead, Henry Grey opted to marry Frances Brandon, daughter of Mary Tudor, Widow Queen of France and Duchess of Suffolk and therefore niece of King Henry VIII.

His second wife was Mary, daughter of Sir John Arundell of a prominent Cornish family, and widow of Robert Radcliffe, 1st Earl of Sussex. They had no children.

Widower again, Henry is presented as suitor of Princess Cecilia of Sweden. However, nothing came out of it.

== Portraiture ==
Arundel's portrait was painted several times, including once by Hans Holbein and by Hans Eworth.

Political offices
Preceded by Unknown	Lord Lieutenant of Sussex; 1559–1561	Succeeded by The Lord Lumley
Academic offices
Preceded by Reginald Pole	Chancellor of the University of Oxford; 1558–1559	Succeeded by John Mason
Political offices
Preceded by Lord St. John	Lord Chamberlain; 1546–1550	Succeeded by The Lord Wentworth
Peerage of England
Preceded by William Fitzalan	Earl of Arundel; 1544–1580	Succeeded by Philip Howard
Preceded by William Fitzalan	Baron Maltravers (writ in acceleration); 1533–1580	Succeeded by Philip Howard
