= Baron Marney =

Extinct barony in the Peerage of England

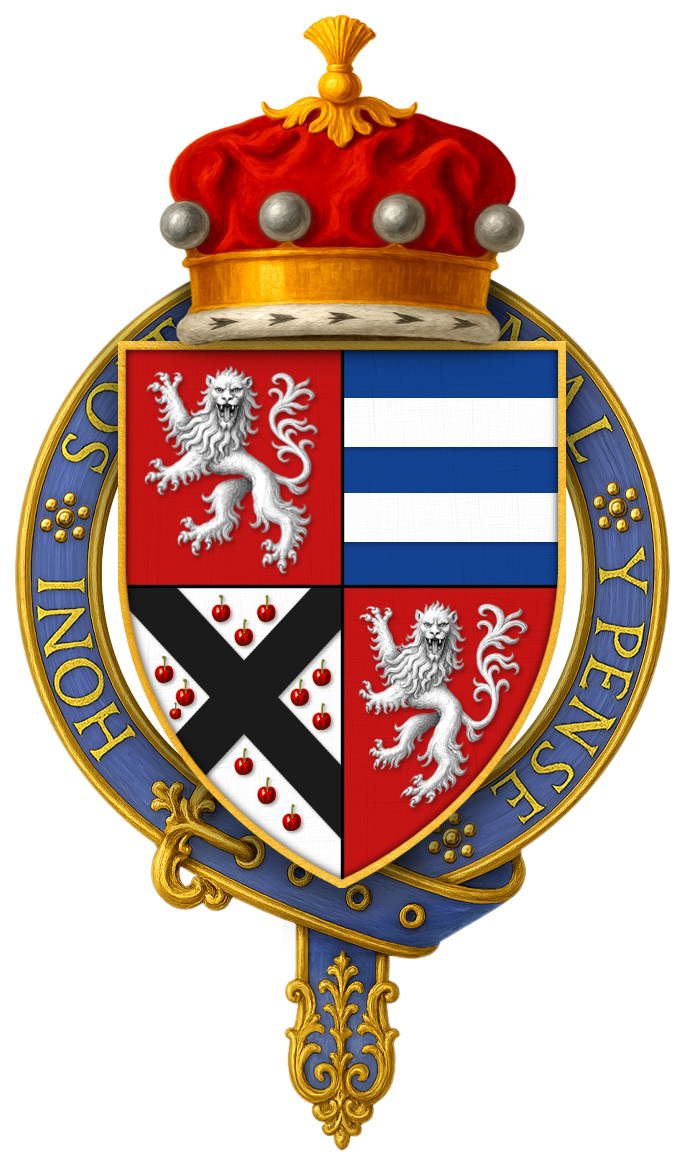
Coat of arms

Baron Marney (or Baron Marny) was a title in the Peerage of England. It was created in 1523 for Sir Henry Marney. The title became extinct on the death of his son, the second Baron, in 1525.

== Barons Marney (1523) ==
- Henry Marney, 1st Baron Marney (c. 1447–1523)
- John Marney, 2nd Baron Marney (1480–1525)
