= Thomas Stanley, 2nd Earl of Derby =

English nobleman, politician, and peer (before 1485–1521)

- Born: before 1485
- Died: 23 May 1521
- Spouse: Anne Hastings
- Issue: Edward Stanley, 3rd Earl of Derby; Margaret Stanley; John Stanley
- Father: George Stanley, 9th Baron Strange
- Mother: Joan Strange

Thomas Stanley, 2nd Earl of Derby (before 1485 – 23 May 1521) was an English nobleman, politician, and peer.

== Family ==
Thomas Stanley was the eldest son of George Stanley, 9th Baron Strange and Joan Strange, daughter and heiress of John Strange, Lord Strange of Knockin, by his first wife, Jacquette Woodville, daughter of Richard Woodville, 1st Earl Rivers. He was the grandson of Thomas Stanley, 1st Earl of Derby, and Eleanor Neville, fourth daughter of Richard Neville, 5th Earl of Salisbury, by Alice Montacute, 5th Countess of Salisbury, the daughter and heiress of Thomas Montagu, 4th Earl of Salisbury. After the death of his first wife, Eleanor Neville, Thomas Stanley's grandfather married Margaret Beaufort, widow of Edmund Tudor, 1st Earl of Richmond, and mother of King Henry VII.

Stanley had four brothers, Anthony, John, Sir James and George, and five sisters, Elizabeth, wife of Sir Edward Stanley, Eleanor, Katherine, Joan, who married Sir Robert Sheffield, and Margaret, wife of John Osbaldeston, esquire.

== Career ==
As a result of his marriage to Joan Strange, Thomas Stanley's father, George, had been summoned to Parliament by writs directed to Georgio Stanley de la Strange, by which he became Lord Strange. George Stanley died at Derby House, London, on 4 or 5 December 1503, predeceasing his father. He was said to have been poisoned at a banquet.

A year later Thomas Stanley's grandfather, the 1st Earl, died at Lathom in Lancashire on 9 November 1504, and Thomas succeeded to the earldom of Derby and the barony of Stanley. When his mother died at Colham Green, Middlesex, on 20 March 1514, Derby inherited the baronies of Strange and Mohun.

Derby was at the Battle of the Spurs in 1513. Both he and his wife were in attendance at the Field of the Cloth of Gold in June 1520, and Derby attended the King at his meeting with the Emperor Charles V at Dover later that year. In the same year, Derby became a member of Gray's Inn.

Derby died at Colham Green, Middlesex, on 23 May 1521, and was buried at Syon. His widow, Anne, died at Colham Green, and was buried on 17 November 1550.

Derby's line failed with the death of James Stanley, 10th Earl of Derby in 1736, when the earldom passed to a descendant of his younger brother, Sir James Stanley, ancestor of the Stanleys of Bickerstaffe.

== Marriage and issue ==
Derby was betrothed in 1498 to Elizabeth Wells, the daughter of John Welles, 1st Viscount Welles, by Cecily of York, the daughter of King Edward IV and Elizabeth Woodville. A papal dispensation was obtained for the marriage. However, Elizabeth died that year.

By indenture dated 17 December 1505 Derby married Anne Hastings, the daughter of Edward Hastings, 2nd Baron Hastings, and Mary Hungerford, and by her had two sons and a daughter:

- Edward Stanley, 3rd Earl of Derby
- Margaret Stanley (d. shortly after January 1534), who married Robert Radcliffe, 1st Earl of Sussex, and by him had two daughters, Jane, who married Anthony Browne, 1st Viscount Montague, and Anne, who married Thomas Wharton, 2nd Baron Wharton.
- John Stanley (died young).

By an unknown mistress, he fathered an illegitimate daughter, Elizabeth Stanley (b. 1502) whom he married to his ward, Thomas Scarisbrick of Scarisbrick and had issue.

== Thomas Stanley, 2nd Earl of Derby, and Shakespeare ==
The failure of Thomas Stanley's grandfather, Lord Stanley, to come to the aid of King Richard III at Bosworth contributed to King Richard's defeat. Lord Stanley, who was by then married to the future Henry VII's mother, Margaret Beaufort, is given a major role in Shakespeare's Richard III. Lord Stanley's son, George, Thomas Stanley's father, was held hostage by King Richard, as noted in this speech given to Lord Stanley in Act IV, scene v of the play:

Sir Christopher, tell Richmond this from me:
That in the sty of the most deadly boar
My son George Stanley is frank'd up in hold;
If I revolt, off goes young George's head;
The fear of that holds off my present aid.

== Ancestry ==
Ancestors of Thomas Stanley, 2nd Earl of Derby

16. Sir John Stanley
8. Thomas Stanley, 1st Baron Stanley
17. Isabel Harington
4. Thomas Stanley, 1st Earl of Derby
18. Sir Robert Goushill
9. Joan Goushill
19. Elizabeth FitzAlan
2. George Stanley, 9th Baron Strange
20. Ralph de Neville, 1st Earl of Westmorland
10. Richard Neville, 5th Earl of Salisbury
21. Joan Beaufort
5. Eleanor Neville
22. Thomas Montacute, 4th Earl of Salisbury
11. Alice Montacute, 5th Countess of Salisbury
23. Eleanor Holland
1. Thomas Stanley, 2nd Earl of Derby
24. John le Strange, 6th Baron Strange
12. Richard le Strange, 7th Baron Strange
25. Maud de Mohun
6. John le Strange, 8th Baron Strange
26. Reynold Cobham, 3rd Baron Cobham of Sterborough
13. Elizabeth Cobham
27. Eleanor Colepeper
3. Joan le Strange, 9th Baroness Strange
28. Richard Woodville
14. Richard Woodville, 1st Earl Rivers
29. Joan Bedlisgate
7. Jacquetta Woodville
30. Peter I, Count of Saint-Pol
15. Jacquetta of Luxembourg
31. Margaret of Baux

Head of State of the Isle of Man
| Preceded by Thomas Stanley as King of Mann | Lord of Mann; 1504–1521 | Succeeded by Edward Stanley |
Peerage of England
| Preceded by Thomas Stanley | Earl of Derby; Baron Stanley; 1504–1521 | Succeeded by Edward Stanley |
| Preceded by Joan le Strange | Baron Strange; Baron Mohun; 1514–1521 | Succeeded by Edward Stanley |
