= Edward Hastings, 2nd Baron Hastings =

English peer

- Born: 26 November 1466; Kirby Muxloe Castle, Leicestershire, England
- Died: 8 November 1506 (aged 39)
- Occupation: Peer
- Spouse: Mary Hungerford (m. 1478-1506)
- Parent(s): Sir William Hastings, 1st Baron Hastings, Katherine Neville
- Relatives: Cecily (half-sister), Sir William (brother), Sir Richard (brother), George (brother), Anne (sister), Elizabeth (sister)

Edward Hastings, 2nd Baron Hastings, KB PC (26 November 1466 – 8 November 1506) was an English peer.

== Origins ==
Edward Hastings was born in Kirby Muxloe Castle, Leicestershire to Sir William Hastings, 1st Baron Hastings and Katherine Neville, the daughter of Richard Neville, 5th Earl of Salisbury, and Alice Montagu, the daughter of Thomas Montagu, 4th Earl of Salisbury. At the time of the marriage Katherine Neville was the widow of William Bonville, 6th Baron Harington (1442–1460), beheaded after the Battle of Wakefield, by whom she had a daughter, Cecily. Edward Hastings had three brothers, Sir William, Sir Richard, and George, and two sisters, Anne, who married George Talbot, 4th Earl of Shrewsbury, and Elizabeth. His brothers William and Richard were alive at the time he made his will on 4 November 1506.

== Career ==
Edward Hastings was invested as a Knight of the Bath in 1475. He was appointed a Privy Councillor in 1504.

== Marriage and Family ==
Between 1478 and 1480, he married Mary Hungerford (born c. 1468 – died before 10 July 1533), daughter of Sir Thomas Hungerford of Rowden and Anne Percy, daughter of Henry Percy, 2nd Earl of Northumberland, and Eleanor Neville. Edward Hastings and Mary Hungerford had two sons and a daughter:

- George Hastings, 1st Earl of Huntingdon (1486/7 – 24 March 1544), who married Anne Stafford, widow of Sir Walter Herbert, and daughter of Henry Stafford, 2nd Duke of Buckingham, and Katherine Wydeville
- William Hastings, who may have predeceased his father, as he is not mentioned in his will
- Anne Hastings (1485 – buried 17 November 1550), who married Thomas Stanley, 2nd Earl of Derby

While he was still only a youth 16 years of age, his father William Hastings, 1st Baron Hastings, incurred the enmity of Richard, Duke of Gloucester, and on 13 June 1483 was arrested at a council meeting on Richard's orders, and beheaded without trial, an event dramatised in Shakespeare's Richard III.

Edward Hastings died, aged 39, on 8 November 1506, and is said to have been buried at the Blackfriars, London. On 1 May 1509 his widow married Sir Richard Sacheverell (d. 14 April 1534), but had no issue by him. She died before 10 July 1533, and was buried at Leicester.

== Ancestry ==
Ancestors of Edward Hastings, 2nd Baron Hastings

16. Ralph Hastings
8. Ralph Hastings
17. Margaret Herle
4. Leonard Hastings
18.
9. Maud Sutton
19.
2. William Hastings, 1st Baron Hastings
20. Sir John Camoys
10. Thomas de Camoys, 1st Baron Camoys
21. Elizabeth de Latimer
5. Alice Camoys
22. Edmund Mortimer, 3rd Earl of March
11. Lady Elizabeth Mortimer
23. Philippa, 5th Countess of Ulster
1. Edward Hastings, 2nd Baron Hastings
24. John Neville, 3rd Baron Neville de Raby
12. Ralph Neville, 1st Earl of Westmorland
25. Maud Percy
6. Richard Neville, 5th Earl of Salisbury
26. John of Gaunt, Duke of Lancaster
13. Lady Joan Beaufort
27. Katherine Swynford
3. Lady Katherine Neville
28. John Montacute, 3rd Earl of Salisbury
14. Thomas Montacute, 4th Earl of Salisbury
29. Maud Francis
7. Alice Montacute
30. Thomas Holland, 2nd Earl of Kent
15. Lady Eleanor Holland
31. Lady Alice Fitzalan

Peerage of England
Preceded by William Hastings	Baron Hastings; 1483–1506	Succeeded by George Hastings
