= Anne Hastings, Countess of Shrewsbury =

English noblewoman

Anne Hastings
- Countess of Shrewsbury; Baroness Furnivall
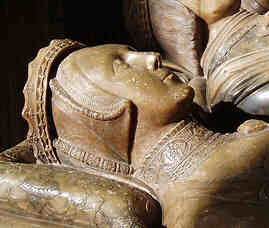
- Effigy of Anne Hastings on the Talbot monument in Shrewsbury Chapel, Sheffield Cathedral. She is on the right side of her husband, and the latter's second wife is on his left
- Born: c. 1471; England
- Died: 1520 (aged about 49); Sheffield, England
- Buried: Shrewsbury Chapel, Sheffield Cathedral (formerly Church of St. Peter and St. Paul)
- Noble family: Hastings; House of Neville
- Spouse: George Talbot, 4th Earl of Shrewsbury
- Issue: Mary Talbot; Francis Talbot, 5th Earl of Shrewsbury; Margaret Talbot; Elizabeth Talbot; Dorothy Talbot; Richard Talbot; Henry Talbot; John Talbot; John Talbot; William Talbot; Anne Talbot
- Father: William Hastings, 1st Baron Hastings
- Mother: Katherine Neville
- Occupation: Lady-in-waiting

Lady Anne Talbot, Countess of Shrewsbury (c. 1471–1520) was an English noblewoman who served as a lady-in-waiting to Queen consort Catherine of Aragon, the first wife of King Henry VIII of England. Anne was the first wife of George Talbot, 4th Earl of Shrewsbury, by whom she had 11 children. Her maternal half-sister was Cecily Bonville, the wealthiest heiress in late 15th-century England.

Anne was also the Baroness Furnivall, as her husband held the title of 9th Baron Furnivall.

== Family and early years ==
Anne was born in about 1471, the youngest child of William Hastings, 1st Baron Hastings, and Katherine Neville, sister of Richard Neville, 16th Earl of Warwick. Anne had four brothers, Sir Edward Hastings, 2nd Baron Hastings, Sir William, Sir Richard, and George, and a sister, Elizabeth. She had an older half-sister Cecily Bonville from her mother's first marriage to William Bonville, 6th Baron Harington who was executed by the command of Queen Margaret of Anjou after the Battle of Wakefield where he fought on the side of the Yorkists. Cecily was the wealthiest heiress in England as well as the suo jure Baroness Harington and Bonville.

Anne grew up during the period in English history when the dynastic civil wars fought between the Houses of York and Lancaster, known as the Wars of the Roses, broke out at intervals and resulted in the deaths of many combatants and supporters from both sides.

Anne's father was a staunch Yorkist, and a close friend and Lord Chamberlain of King Edward IV. After the latter's death in April 1483, Hastings was persuaded by his mistress Jane Shore to enter into a conspiracy against the late king's youngest brother, Richard, Duke of Gloucester, who had been made Lord Protector of the realm. Upon discovery of Hastings treachery, Gloucester gave the order for his execution, which was carried out at the Tower of London on 13 June 1483. Anne's father was not attainted, however, and her mother, Katherine was placed under Gloucester's protection following his ascension as King Richard III of England, which secured her privileges and rights.

At the time of her father's execution, Anne was already married to Hastings' teenaged ward. Her mother, by royal permission, took over as legal guardian of Anne's husband until he came of age.

== Marriage and issue ==
Sometime before 27 June 1481, at the age of about 10, Anne married her father's 13-year-old ward, George Talbot, 4th Earl of Shrewsbury, 9th Baron Furnivall. George was her second cousin. She was his first wife, and upon their marriage she was styled as Countess of Shrewsbury and Baroness Furnivall.

Together George and Anne had 11 children:

- Francis Talbot, later 11th Baron Talbot and 5th Earl of Shrewsbury (c. 1500-1560)
- Elizabeth Talbot (c. 1507-aft. 6 May 1552), married aft. 18 May 1519 William Dacre, 3rd Baron Dacre of Gilsland, and had issue.
- Margaret Talbot (dsp.), married, as his first wife, Henry Clifford, 1st Earl of Cumberland
- Mary Talbot (d. 16 April 1572), married c. January 1523/1524, to Henry Percy, 6th Earl of Northumberland.
- Henry Talbot, styled Lord Talbot (d. young)
- John Talbot (d. young)
- John Talbot (d. young)
- William Talbot, Marshal of Ireland
- Richard Talbot
- Anne Talbot
- Dorothy Talbot

== At the royal court ==
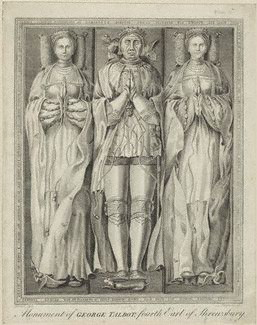
George Talbot, 4th Earl of Shrewsbury, with his two wives (Anne Hastings is on the left)

Early in the reign of King Henry VIII of England, Anne came to court where she served as a lady-in-waiting to Queen consort Catherine of Aragon. It is not known how long she served in this capacity.

== Death ==
Anne died on an unknown date in 1520. She was buried in the Church of St. Peter and St. Paul, which is now the Sheffield Cathedral. Her husband married secondly Elizabeth Walden (died July 1567), by whom he had a daughter, Anne (d.18 July 1588).

George Talbot, Earl of Shrewsbury had a chapel added to the church in 1520 to serve as a family chapel; and after his own death, a monument was built in Shrewsbury Chapel where his effigy can be seen flanked by those of Anne on his right and his second wife, Elizabeth on his left.

== Ancestry ==
Ancestors of Anne Hastings, Countess of Shrewsbury

8. Sir Ralph Hastings (1322-1397)
4. Sir Leonard Hastings (c.1397-1455)
9. Maud
2. William Hastings, 1st Baron Hastings (1431-1483)
10. Thomas de Camoys, 1st Baron Camoys
5. Alice de Camoys
11. Lady Elizabeth Mortimer
1. Anne Hastings
12. Ralph de Neville, 1st Earl of Westmorland (c.1364-1425)
6. Richard Neville, 5th Earl of Salisbury (1400-1460)
13. Lady Joan Beaufort, Countess of Westmorland (c.1379-1440)
3. Katherine Neville, Baroness Hastings (1442-1503)
14. Thomas Montacute, 4th Earl of Salisbury (1388-1428)
7. Alice Neville, 5th Countess of Salisbury (1407-1462)
15. Lady Eleanor Holland, Countess of Salisbury (1386-1413)
