= Francis Talbot, 5th Earl of Shrewsbury =

English nobleman (1500–1560)

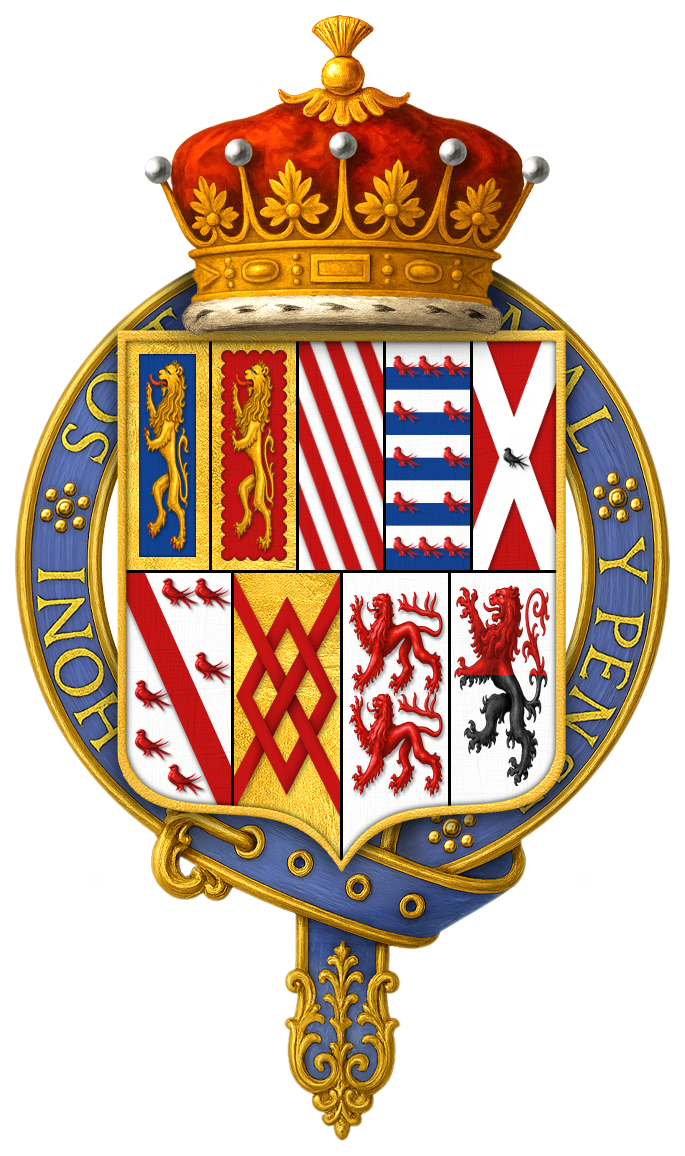
Arms of Sir Francis Talbot, 5th Earl of Shrewsbury, KG.

Francis Talbot, 5th Earl of Shrewsbury, 5th Earl of Waterford, 11th Baron Talbot, KG (1500 – 25 September 1560) was the son of George Talbot, 4th Earl of Shrewsbury, and Anne Hastings. He also held the subsidiary titles of 14th Baron Strange of Blackmere and 10th Baron Furnivall.

== Life ==
Francis Talbot was born in Sheffield Castle in 1500.

His maternal grandparents were William Hastings, 1st Baron Hastings, and Katherine Neville. Katherine was a daughter of Richard Neville, 5th Earl of Salisbury, and Alice Neville, 5th Countess of Salisbury.

He succeeded his father in 1538, taking over his father's position as Chamberlain of the Exchequer for life.

Though a Roman Catholic, he retained the royal favour during the reign of Henry VIII, and received some lands from the dissolution of the monasteries, including those belonging to Worksop Priory. He was made a Knight of the Garter in 1545. While he took little part in national politics, he was a powerful figure in the North of the kingdom. He took part in the invasion of Scotland which culminated in the Battle of Pinkie (1547), and was made president of the Council of the North in 1549. Under Edward VI he conformed to the reformed religion but it was no secret that his sympathies were with the Catholic faith. Although not normally active in national politics he was a member of the King's Council; some of his fellow councillors are said to have feared that he might raise the West in favour of Mary. While he did not oppose the proclamation of Lady Jane Grey as Queen, he almost certainly worked to persuade the council to recognise Mary I and was one of the first to openly voice support for her. Mary rewarded him with a place on her Council.

He married Mary Dacre (1502–1538), daughter of Thomas Dacre, 2nd Baron Dacre, on 30 November 1523. They had three children:

- George Talbot, 6th Earl of Shrewsbury (1528–1590)
- Anne Talbot, Baroness Bray, Baroness Wharton (c. 1524 – 3 February 1585). Married in 1542 her first husband John Braye, 2nd Baron Braye, son and heir of Edmund Braye, 1st Baron Braye; she married secondly in 1561 Thomas Wharton, 1st Baron Wharton. There is no evidence she had issue by either husband.
- Thomas Talbot (d. vita patris unmarried and without issue)

He married a second time to Grace Shakerley (d. 1560), daughter of Robert Shakerley. They had one son, Sir John Talbot, born in 1541 in Grafton, Worcester, England

== Notes ==
Political offices
Preceded by The Earl of Shrewsbury	Lord High Steward of Ireland; 1538–1560	Succeeded by The Earl of Shrewsbury
Legal offices
Preceded by Sir Anthony Browne	Justice in Eyre north of the Trent; 1548–1560	Succeeded by The Earl of Shrewsbury
Peerage of England
Preceded by George Talbot	Earl of Shrewsbury; 1538–1560	Succeeded by George Talbot
Preceded by George Talbot	Baron Talbot (descended by acceleration); 1538–1560	Succeeded by George Talbot
Peerage of Ireland
Preceded by George Talbot	Earl of Waterford; 1538–1533	Succeeded by George Talbot
