= Katherine Neville, Baroness Hastings =

English noblewoman (1442–1504)

Katherine Neville
- Baroness Harington of Aldingham; Baroness Hastings
- Born: 1442; England
- Died: between 22 November 1503 and 25 March 1504; England
- Buried: Ashby de la Zouche, Leicestershire
- Noble family: House of Neville
- Spouses: William Bonville, 6th Baron Harington of Aldingham; William Hastings, 1st Baron Hastings
- Issue: Cecily Bonville; Richard Hastings; William Hastings; Sir Edward Hastings, 2nd Baron Hastings; Richard Hastings; William Hastings; Anne Hastings
- Father: Richard Neville, 5th Earl of Salisbury
- Mother: Alice Montacute, 5th Countess of Salisbury

Katherine Neville, Baroness Hastings (1442 – between January and 25 March 1504), was a noblewoman and a member of the powerful Neville family of northern England. She was one of the six daughters of Richard Neville, 5th Earl of Salisbury, and the sister of military commander Richard Neville, 16th Earl of Warwick, known to history as Warwick the Kingmaker.

She was married twice. By her first husband William Bonville, 6th Baron Harington of Aldingham, she was the mother of Cecily Bonville, who became the wealthiest heiress in England following the deaths in the Battle of Wakefield of Katherine's husband and her father-in-law; less than two months later, William Bonville's grandfather, William Bonville, 1st Baron Bonville, was executed following the Yorkist defeat at the Second Battle of St Albans. Katherine's second husband was William Hastings, 1st Baron Hastings, a powerful noble who was beheaded in 1483 on the order of King Richard III, who placed Katherine directly under his protection.

== Family ==
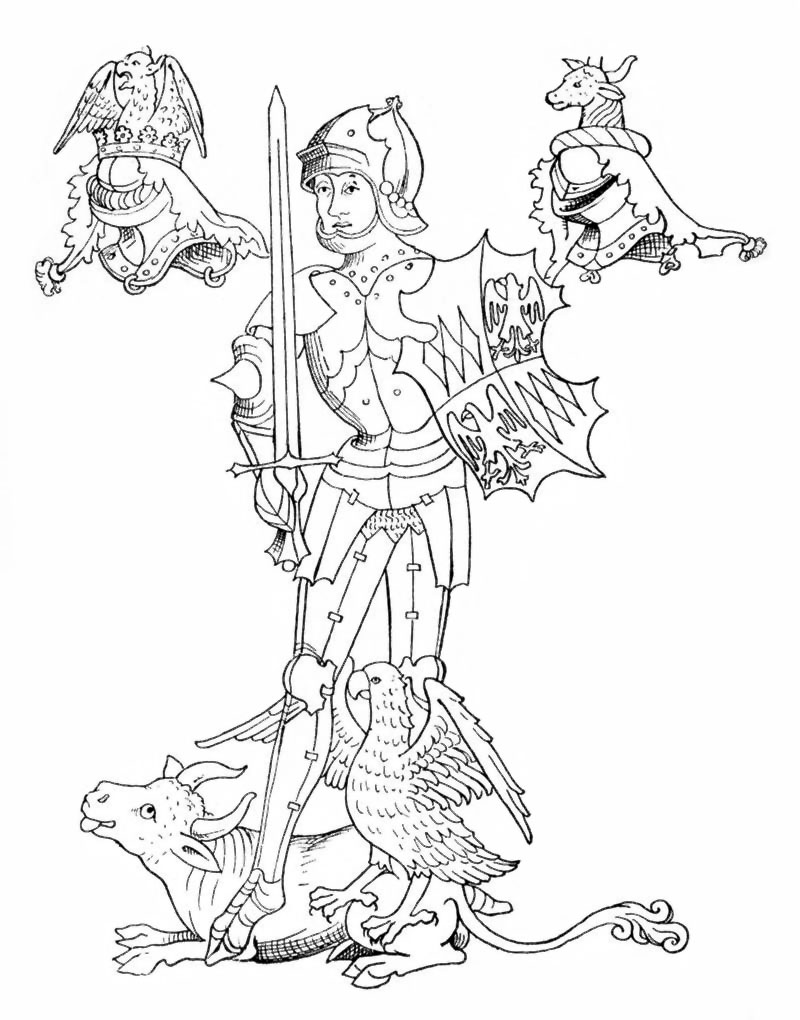
Richard Neville, 16th Earl of Warwick, also known as Warwick the Kingmaker, was the eldest brother of Katherine Neville.

Lady Katherine Neville was born in 1442, one of the ten children and the fifth-eldest daughter of Richard Neville, 5th Earl of Salisbury and Alice Montacute, suo jure 5th Countess of Salisbury. Her mother was the only child and heiress of Thomas Montacute, 4th Earl of Salisbury by his first wife Lady Eleanor Holland. Katherine's eldest brother was Richard Neville, 16th Earl of Warwick, 6th Earl of Salisbury, also known as Warwick the Kingmaker. He was the most important and influential peer in the realm, and one of the principal protagonists in the Wars of the Roses. Her aunt, Cecily Neville, Duchess of York, mother of future kings and Katherine's first cousins, Edward IV and Richard III, was another key figure in the dynastic civil wars that dominated most of the latter half of 15th-century England. Her niece, Anne Neville (youngest daughter of the "Kingmaker") would become Queen of England as the consort of Richard III; Katherine's sister Alice, Baroness FitzHugh, and her other niece, Elizabeth FitzHugh, were personally selected as Anne's chief ladies-in-waiting. Her paternal grandparents were Ralph Neville, 1st Earl of Westmorland and Joan Beaufort, Countess of Westmoreland, a daughter of John of Gaunt by his third wife, Katherine de Roet, making her a direct descendant of Edward III.

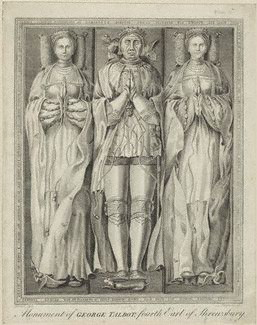
A recumbent effigy shows Anne Hastings, daughter of Katherine Neville, on the right side of her husband George Talbot, 4th Earl of Shrewsbury. His second wife is on his left side.

== Marriages and issue ==
Lady Katherine married her first husband, William Bonville, 6th Baron Harington of Aldingham in 1458. The Bonvilles were, like her own family, staunch adherents of the House of York. The marriage produced one daughter:

- Cecily Bonville, suo jure 2nd Baroness Bonville, 7th Baroness Harington of Aldingham (c. 30 June 1460 – 12 May 1529), married on 18 July 1474, Thomas Grey, 1st Marquess of Dorset, by whom she had fourteen children.

Katherine's husband William, along with his father, William Bonville, was executed on the battlefield after the Yorkist defeat at the Battle of Wakefield on 30 December 1460 by the victorious forces of queen consort Margaret of Anjou who headed the Lancastrian faction. Both her father and first cousin, Edmund, Earl of Rutland, were also executed after the battle, which had been commanded by Henry Beaufort, 3rd Duke of Somerset. Queen Margaret had not been present at Wakefield as she was in Scotland at the time raising support for the Lancastrian cause. Less than two months later, William's grandfather, William Bonville, 1st Baron Bonville was decapitated on 18 February 1461 in an act of vengeance by Queen Margaret who was present and personally ordered his execution after the Yorkists suffered another defeat at the Second Battle of St Albans on the previous day. Katherine's six-month-old daughter succeeded to the titles of suo jure 2nd Baroness Bonville and suo jure 7th Baroness Harington of Aldingham, and inherited the vast Bonville and Harington estates, becoming the wealthiest heiress in England.

Katherine was left a widow at the age of eighteen. She did not, however, remain a widow for long; shortly before 6 February 1462 her brother Richard Neville, Earl of Warwick, arranged a marriage between her and William Hastings, 1st Baron Hastings, a powerful noble, and a close friend and Lord Chamberlain of Edward IV who had replaced Henry VI as king of England on 4 March 1461 when he was proclaimed king in London. The proclamation was followed by the decisive Yorkist victory on 29 March at the Battle of Towton in which Edward had served as commander of the Yorkist army and crushingly defeated the Lancastrians.

In addition to her dowry, Katherine brought the wardship of her daughter Cecily to her new husband. Together William Hastings and Katherine had six children:

- Richard Hastings (1464–1465)
- William Hastings (1466–1466)
- Sir Edward Hastings, 2nd Baron Hastings (26 November 1466 – 8 November 1506), married Mary Hungerford, Baroness Botreaux, by whom he had an issue.
- Richard Hastings (born 1468)
- William Hastings (1470 – after 1540), married Jane Sheffield
- Anne Hastings (c. 1471 – 1520), married before 27 June 1481 as his first wife George Talbot, 4th Earl of Shrewsbury,

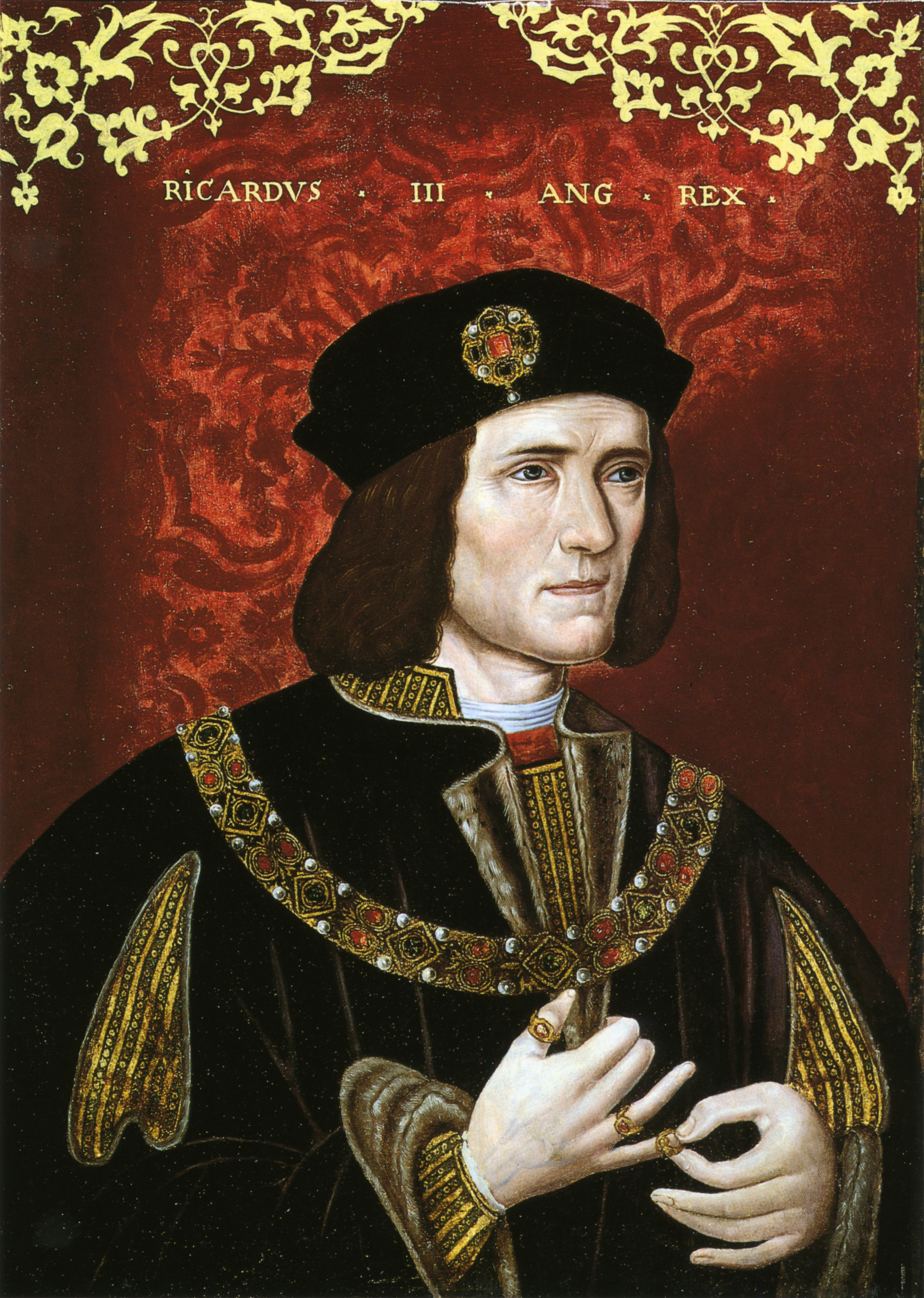
King Richard III of England, Katherine's cousin, ordered the execution of her second husband, William Hastings, 1st Baron Hastings.

== Execution of William Hastings ==
King Edward died on 9 April 1483; his son Edward V and his kingdom were placed under the guardianship of his youngest brother Richard, Duke of Gloucester who was made Lord Protector of England. It was Katherine's husband William Hastings who advised Richard to take the young King Edward V into protective custody immediately following the death of Edward IV.

It was about this time that Katherine's husband became the lover of Jane Shore, a former mistress of both King Edward IV and her son-in-law, Thomas Grey, Marquess of Dorset. The latter had married her eldest daughter, Cecily in 1474. Hastings had confided to his mistress his concern that his considerable power and influence was on the wane under the protectorate of Richard. She encouraged him to enter into a conspiracy with the Woodville family against the Lord Protector. Richard, upon discovering Hastings' treachery ordered his immediate execution, which took place on 13 June 1483 at the Tower of London. Several weeks later, Richard sealed an indenture, swearing to take Katherine directly under his protection and to

"secure for her the enjoyment of her husband's lands, goods, privileges, and the custody not only of their heir until the boy came of age but also the wardship of the young Earl of Shrewsbury who was married to their daughter, Anne".

Richard assured Katherine that Hastings would never be attainted, and that she would be defended against any attempt by intimidation or fraud to deprive her of her rights.

Shortly after Hastings' death, on 26 June, Richard was proclaimed King of England which was supported by an Act of Parliament known as Titulus Regius that declared his nephew King Edward V and his siblings illegitimate. He was crowned king on 6 July.

In spite of Richard's promise to uphold her interests, his close friend and ally, Francis Lovell, 1st Viscount Lovell claimed that the Hastings manors of Ashby and Bagsworth, and the Beaumont estates belonged to him, although these had been left to Katherine following her husband's execution. In order for Katherine to retain these properties, she was compelled to pay Lovell the sum of 200 marks in cash and give him lands totalling the same amount per annum. Richard made no move to curtail the avarice of his friend, who had assumed a powerful role in the government during the King's brief reign. King Richard was killed at the Battle of Bosworth on 22 August 1485 and the Lancastrian victor, Henry Tudor subsequently ascended the throne as Henry VII. Katherine's eldest surviving son, Edward fought on the side of King Henry against Lovell at the Battle of Stoke in June 1487. This battle saw the final defeat of the House of York and Lovell, as one of the Yorkists' chief leaders, afterwards fled to Scotland; however, his eventual fate remains unknown.

== Death ==
Katherine never remarried. She herself died on an unknown date in early 1504 having left a will dated 22 November 1503, arranging her burial within the Lady Chapel at the parish church of Ashby de la Zouche, Leicestershire. Katherine's will, along with many religious bequests, names her eldest daughter Cecily as one of her executors. It reads as follows:

"Where I owe unto Cecilie [Cecily], Marquesse Dorset, certain summes of money which I borrowed of her at diverse times, I will that the said Cecilie in full contentation of all summes of money as I owe unto her, have my bed of arress [arras], tittor, tester, and counterpane, which she late borrowed of me, and over that I woll that she have my tabulet of gold that she now holds as a pledge, and the curtains of blew [blue] sarcionet, and three quistons of counterfeit arress [arras] with imagery of women, a long quiston, and the short of blew [blue] velvet, also two carpets" and she "makes and ordaines Cecilie, Marquis Dorset, widow," one of her executors.

The will was proved on 25 March 1504, indicating that she had died before that date.

== Ancestry ==
Ancestors of Katherine Neville, Baroness Hastings

16. Ralph Neville, 2nd Baron Neville de Raby
8. John Neville, 3rd Baron Neville de Raby
17. Alice de Audley
4. Ralph Neville, 1st Earl of Westmoreland
18. Henry de Percy, 2nd Baron Percy
9. Maud Percy
19. Idoine de Clifford
2. Richard Neville, 5th Earl of Salisbury
20. Edward III of England
10. John of Gaunt, 1st Duke of Lancaster
21. Philippa of Hainault
5. Lady Joan Beaufort
22. Sir Payne de Roet
11. Katherine Swynford
23. N.N.
1. Katherine Neville
24. Sir John de Montacute
12. John de Montacute, 3rd Earl of Salisbury
25. Margaret de Monthermer
6. Thomas Montacute, 4th Earl of Salisbury
26. Adam Francis
13. Maud Francis
27. Agnes Champnes
3. Alice Montacute, 5th Countess of Salisbury
28. Thomas Holland, 1st Earl of Kent
14. Thomas Holland, 2nd Earl of Kent
29. Lady Joan, 4th Countess of Kent, Princess of Wales
7. Lady Eleanor Holland
30. Richard Fitzalan, 10th Earl of Arundel
15. Lady Alice FitzAlan
31. Eleanor of Lancaster
