= Mary Percy, Countess of Northumberland =

English noble

Mary Percy, Countess of Northumberland (née Lady Mary Talbot; died 16 April 1572) was a courtier and noblewoman during the reign of Henry VIII of England. She was the daughter of George Talbot, 4th Earl of Shrewsbury. Her husband, Henry Percy, 6th Earl of Northumberland, had wished to marry Anne Boleyn instead of her.

== Family ==
Mary Talbot was one of the eleven children of George Talbot, 4th Earl of Shrewsbury, and his first wife, Anne Hastings. Her paternal grandparents were John Talbot, 3rd Earl of Shrewsbury, and Catherine Stafford, daughter of Humphrey Stafford, 1st Duke of Buckingham, and Lady Anne Neville. Her maternal grandparents were William Hastings, 1st Baron Hastings, and Katherine Neville, a younger sister of Richard Neville, 16th Earl of Warwick.

== Marriage ==
In January 1524, Lady Mary was forced to marry Henry Percy, heir to the earldom of Northumberland, who had fallen in love with Anne Boleyn, then a lady-in-waiting to Queen Catherine of Aragon. He did not wish to marry Mary. It was Cardinal Thomas Wolsey who was responsible for breaking up the affair between Henry and Anne, reminding Henry of his precontract with Mary Talbot, to whom he had been betrothed from 1516. After Henry's father, the 5th Earl of Northumberland, was quickly summoned to the English court and apprised of the situation, he took Henry Percy home to Alnwick Castle in Northumberland. The date of the marriage is debated, with estimates made between September 1523 and August 1525 or August 1526 It seems to have been an unhappy marriage from the start.

Henry succeeded his father as the 6th Earl on 19 May 1527, and Mary was henceforth styled as the Countess of Northumberland. The marriage, however, was unhappy, and they had no living children. In June 1532, Mary sought an annulment, on the grounds that her husband had a pre-contract with Anne Boleyn. Percy was questioned by Henry VIII and the petition was thrown out by Parliament; the Percys remained married.

Mary died on 16 April 1572, Henry Percy having died many years before on 30 June 1537. In later life, though she had a grant of abbey lands from the Dissolution of the Monasteries, she was suspected of being a Roman Catholic, a favourer of Mary, Queen of Scots, and of hearing mass in her house. She was buried in Sheffield church.
