= Countess of Northumberland =

Countess of Northumberland is a title given to the wife of the Earl of Northumberland. Women who have held the title include:

- Eleanor Neville, Countess of Northumberland (c.1397-1472)
- Mary Percy, Countess of Northumberland (died 1572)
- Anne Percy, Countess of Northumberland (1536–1596)
- Dorothy Percy, Countess of Northumberland (c.1564-1619)
- Elizabeth Percy, Countess of Northumberland (1646–1690)
