= Alan Buxhull =

Knight of the Garter and Constable of the Tower of London

Sir Alan Buxhull (Note: The medievalist T. F. Tout notes that the family name "is generally spelt Buxhill in records, but it represents a place now called Bugshill in Sussex, near Robertsbridge, which Alan inherited".) (Note: Surname also shown as Boxhulle, Boxhul, Boxhull, Boxhill, Boxhall and Bokeshull) KG (c. 1323 – 2 November 1381) was an English soldier and nobleman.

== Biography ==
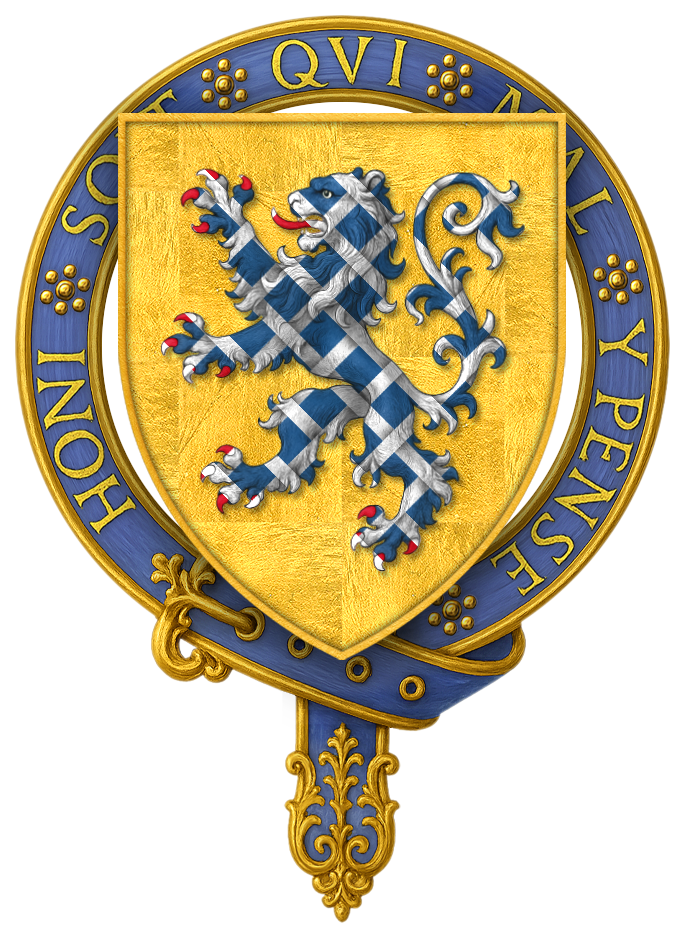
Arms of Alan Buxhull, as shown on his garter plate.

Alan Buxhull was the only son of Sir Alan Buxhull, lord of Buxhull in Sussex and tenant-in-chief of Bryanston in Dorset; and of his wife Maud. His father died in 1325, when the younger Alan was only 2 years old.

Buxhull served as Constable of the Tower of London from 1366 until his death. He was chamberlain of the Royal household from around 1369 to 1370 and a knight of the chamber.

He was a deputy in Robert Knolles's army during the Hundred Years War, although there is evidence to suggest that this was a shared command. He took command of the fortified abbey of St Maur in 1370 and fought in the Battle of Pontvallain the same year. He was sufficiently important among Knolles's captains that the historian Jonathan Sumption has suggested that Buxhill's departure was the spark that led to the disintegration of Knolles's army. He was later placed in command of Saint-Sauveur-le-Vicomte in Normandy, where he later claimed to have expended a large sum—more than he could account for—on paying ransoms of English prisoners. He subsequently complained that he had to spend over 3,000 francs on "the payment of the ransoms of several bankrupt prisoners who had been captured by the French on different occasions". (Note: Much information exists, in the form of accounts and receipts, of Buxhull's tenure of Saint-Sauveur.) He was created a Knight of the Garter in 1372.

He took part in the naval expedition to France in 1374.

Buxhull was described by the chronicler Jean Froissart as a "right valiant Knight" and an "uncommonly able man".

King Edward III became ill in his later years, and the historian G. L. Harriss has argued that it was men such as Buxhull—of the household and physically close to the King—who "manipulated his authority" by regulating who was allowed to see him, and thus controlled the royal patronage.

== Death and burial ==
Buxhull died on 2 November 1381, and was buried in the retroquire of St Paul's Cathedral, close to the shrine of St Erkenwald. His grave was marked by a monumental brass. His choice of burial place may have been influenced by its proximity to the intended tomb of John of Gaunt (d.1399) and his first wife, Blanche of Lancaster (d.1368).

== Marriage and issue ==
Buxhull married firstly a woman with the surname of Bigwood. They are known to have had the following issue:

- Elizabeth Buxhull, married Roger Lynde, had issue.
- Amice Buxhull, married firstly John Beverley and secondly to Robert Bardolf, had issue for both marriages.

His second marriage was to Maud Francis, widow of John Aubrey, and daughter of Adam Francis and Agnes Chaumpneys. Maud was said to be the richest woman in England. A son Alan was born posthumously in 1382 and would later grow up to be knighted in turn. After her husband's death, Maud became the wife of John Montagu, 3rd Earl of Salisbury, and the foster mother of the future Henry V. The younger Sir Alan therefore became half brother to Thomas Montagu, 4th Earl of Salisbury, who he fought alongside at the Battle of Verneuil.
