= Alice Montacute, 5th Countess of Salisbury =

English noblewoman (1407–1462)

Lady Alice Montacute
- 5th Countess of Salisbury
- Born: Alice Montacute; 1407; England
- Died: Before 9 December 1462
- Buried: Bisham Abbey
- Noble family: Montagu (by birth); Neville (by marriage)
- Spouse: Richard Neville, 5th Earl of Salisbury
- Issue among others: Cecily, Duchess of Warwick; Richard, Earl of Warwick; Thomas, knight; Alice, Baroness FitzHugh; John, Marquess of Montagu; George, Archbishop of York; Katherine, Baroness Hastings
- Father: Thomas Montagu, 4th Earl of Salisbury
- Mother: Eleanor Holland

Alice Montacute (1407 – before 9 December 1462) was an English noblewoman and the suo jure 5th Countess of Salisbury, 6th Baroness Monthermer, and 7th and 4th Baroness Montagu, having succeeded to the titles in 1428.

Her husband, Richard Neville, became 5th Earl of Salisbury by right of his marriage to Alice.

She was attained for high treason by the Parliament of Devils in November 1459. She escaped to Ireland and came back to England with her son the Earl of Warwick in the spring of 1460.

== Marriage and children ==
Alice was born in 1407, the daughter and only legitimate child, of Thomas Montagu, 4th Earl of Salisbury, and Eleanor Holland, who was the daughter of Thomas Holland, 2nd Earl of Kent, and Lady Alice FitzAlan. Alice FitzAlan was a daughter of Richard FitzAlan, 3rd Earl of Arundel, and Eleanor of Lancaster.

In 1420, Alice married Richard Neville, who became the 5th Earl of Salisbury by right of his wife on the death of her father Thomas Montagu in 1428. Alice was thereafter styled as Countess of Salisbury.

The principal seat of the family was at Bisham Manor in Berkshire although their lands lay chiefly around Christchurch in Hampshire and Wiltshire.

Her husband Richard was beheaded in 1460. She died sometime before 9 December 1462 and was buried in the Montagu Mausoleum at Bisham Abbey.

Alice and Richard had ten children who survived infancy:

- Lady Joan Neville (c. 1424–1462), who married William FitzAlan, 9th Earl of Arundel.
- Lady Cecily Neville (c. 1425–1450), who married firstly Henry de Beauchamp, 1st Duke of Warwick and secondly John Tiptoft, 1st Earl of Worcester.
- Richard Neville, 16th Earl of Warwick (1428–1471), who married the heiress Anne Beauchamp, suo jure 16th Countess of Warwick. They were parents to Richard III's queen consort Anne Neville.
- Thomas Neville (c. 1429–1460), who was knighted in 1449 and died at the Battle of Wakefield.
- Lady Alice Neville (c. 1430–after 1503), who married Henry FitzHugh, 5th Baron FitzHugh. Their daughter, Elizabeth, married William Parr, 1st Baron Parr of Kendal. The two were grandparents to Queen consort Catherine Parr, the sixth wife of King Henry VIII.
- John Neville, 1st Marquess of Montagu (c. 1431–1471) who married Isabel Ingoldesthorpe.
- George Neville (c. 1432–1476), who became Archbishop of York and Chancellor of England.
- Lady Eleanor Neville (c. 1438–before 1472), who married Thomas Stanley, 1st Earl of Derby.
- Lady Katherine Neville (c. 1442–1503/04), who married firstly William Bonville, 6th Baron of Harington, and secondly William Hastings, 1st Baron Hastings. By her first husband, she was the mother of Cecily Bonville who became Marchioness of Dorset by her first marriage to Thomas Grey, 1st Marquess of Dorset, and Countess of Wiltshire by her second marriage to Henry Stafford, 1st Earl of Wiltshire.
- Lady Margaret Neville (c. 1444–1506), who married John de Vere, 13th Earl of Oxford.

== Ancestry ==
Ancestors of Alice Montacute, 5th Countess of Salisbury

8. Sir John Montagu
4. John Montagu, 3rd Earl of Salisbury
9. Margaret de Monthermer, 3rd Baroness de Monthermer
2. Thomas Montagu, 4th Earl of Salisbury
10. Sir Adam Francis
5. Maud Francis
11. Alice Champneis
1. Alice Montagu, 5th Countess of Salisbury
12. Thomas Holland, 1st Earl of Kent
6. Thomas Holland, 2nd Earl of Kent
13. Joan of Kent
3. Lady Eleanor Holland
14. Richard FitzAlan, 10th Earl of Arundel
7. Lady Alice FitzAlan
15. Eleanor of Lancaster

Peerage of England
Preceded by Thomas Montagu	Countess of Salisbury; 1428–1462	Succeeded by Richard Neville
