= George Talbot, 4th Earl of Shrewsbury =

English nobleman and military commander

George Talbot
- 4th Earl of Shrewsbury; 4th Earl of Waterford; 10th Baron Talbot; 9th Baron Furnivall
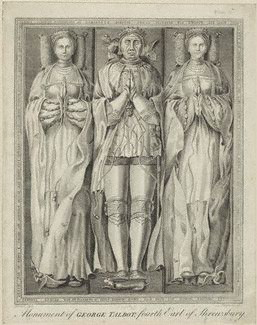
- Effigy of George Talbot on the Talbot monument in the Shrewsbury Chapel, Sheffield Cathedral. His first wife Anne is on his right side and his second, Elizabeth, on his left.
- Born: c. 1468; Shifnal, Shropshire, England
- Died: 26 July 1538 (aged 70); Wingfield Manor, Derbyshire, England
- Buried: Sheffield Cathedral, South Yorkshire, England
- Noble family: Talbot; Stafford
- Spouses: Lady Anne Hastings; Elizabeth Walden
- Issue: Francis Talbot, 5th Earl of Shrewsbury; Lady Mary Talbot; Lady Margaret Talbot; Lady Elizabeth Talbot; Lady Dorothy Talbot; Hon. Richard Talbot; Hon. Henry Talbot; Hon. John Talbot; Hon. John Talbot; Hon. William Talbot; Lady Anne Talbot; Lady Anne Talbot
- Father: John Talbot, 3rd Earl of Shrewsbury
- Mother: Lady Catherine Stafford

George Talbot, 4th Earl of Shrewsbury, 4th Earl of Waterford, 10th Baron Talbot, KG, KB, PC (c. 1468 – 26 July 1538) was the son of John Talbot, 3rd Earl of Shrewsbury, and Lady Catherine Stafford, daughter of the 1st Duke of Buckingham. He also held the subsidiary titles of 13th Baron Strange of Blackmere and 9th Baron Furnivall.

== Early life ==
The Earl was born at Shifnal, Shropshire, in 1468. He succeeded to his father's peerage in 1473, when aged five years, and was appointed a Knight of the Bath in 1475.

== Career ==
Under King Henry VII, the Earl was a distinguished and honoured warrior. He fought with distinction against Lambert Simnel at the Battle of Stoke and was created a Knight of the Garter after the battle. In 1489 he joined the English expedition to Flanders to aid the Emperor against the French. The same year, upon the birth of Henry's second child, a daughter named Margaret Tudor, Talbot became the first Tudor princess's godfather.

On the accession of King Henry VIII, the Earl continued to serve the King as he did his father and again distinguished himself amongst his peers as a great warrior. During Henry's reign, the Earl became a powerful man. Already hereditary Lord High Steward of Ireland from 1473 to 1538, he was then appointed Lord Steward of the King's Household and a Chamberlain of the Exchequer from 1509 to 1538, a Privy Counsellor in 1512 and Lieutenant-General of the North in 1522. He was Lieutenant-General of the English army sent to invade France in 1512, where he was present at the Battle of the Spurs and captured Thérouanne in August 1513. He was later present at the Field of the Cloth of Gold, commanded the army sent to control the border of Scotland, and was given many other high political positions at court.

When the divorce question came on King Henry's 'Great Matter', Shrewsbury supported it, gave evidence at Queen Katherine of Aragon's trial, and signed the letter to the pope urging him to grant the divorce. He also signed the articles against Cardinal Thomas Wolsey in 1529. On 4 November 1530, Wolsey was arrested for treason and brought south from York for his trial, arriving four days later at the Manor Lodge of the Earl where he stayed for eighteen days. He was treated kindly by the Earl and his family, who tried to make his stay as comfortable as possible. However, Wolsey became very ill before leaving Sheffield while under guard.

When the rebellion in the north broke out in October 1536, Shrewsbury promptly raised forces on his own authority, and 'his courage and fidelity on this occasion perhaps saved Henry's crown.' The Earl, John Russell, Sir William Parr (uncle of Queen consort Catherine Parr), William Gonson, Sir Francis Bryan and Admiral Sir William FitzWilliam, who were royalists, mustered the 1,000 troops from Gloucester who lived at Stony Stratford who were present against the rebels of the Pilgrimage of Grace at Ampthill, Bedfordshire. It was Thomas Howard, 3rd Duke of Norfolk, and the 4th Earl of Shrewsbury, who opened negotiations with the insurgents at Doncaster, where Robert Aske had assembled between thirty and forty thousand men. An armistice was then agreed upon, and the insurgents laid their demands before the King.

== Family ==
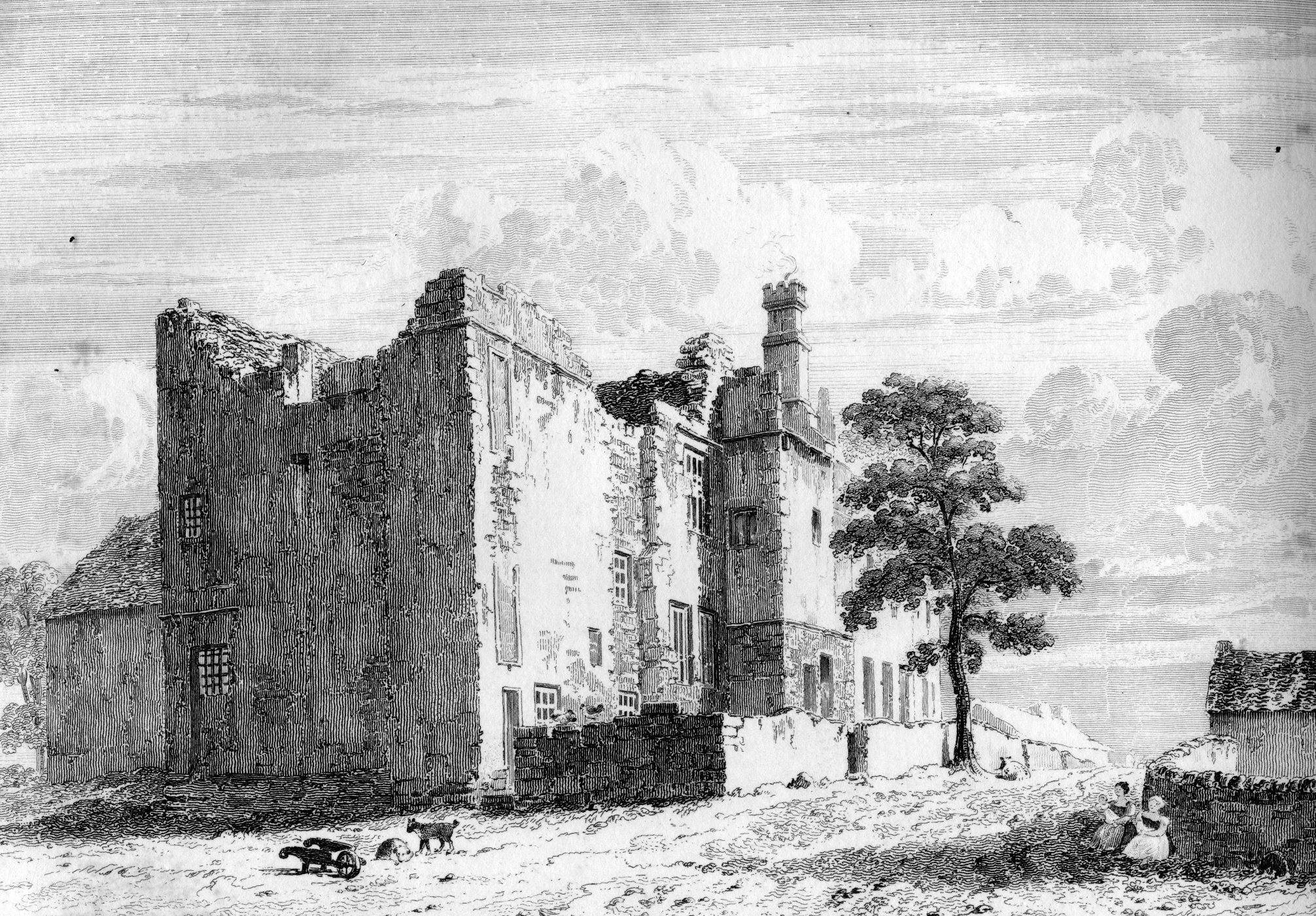
Ruins of Sheffield Manor, c.1819

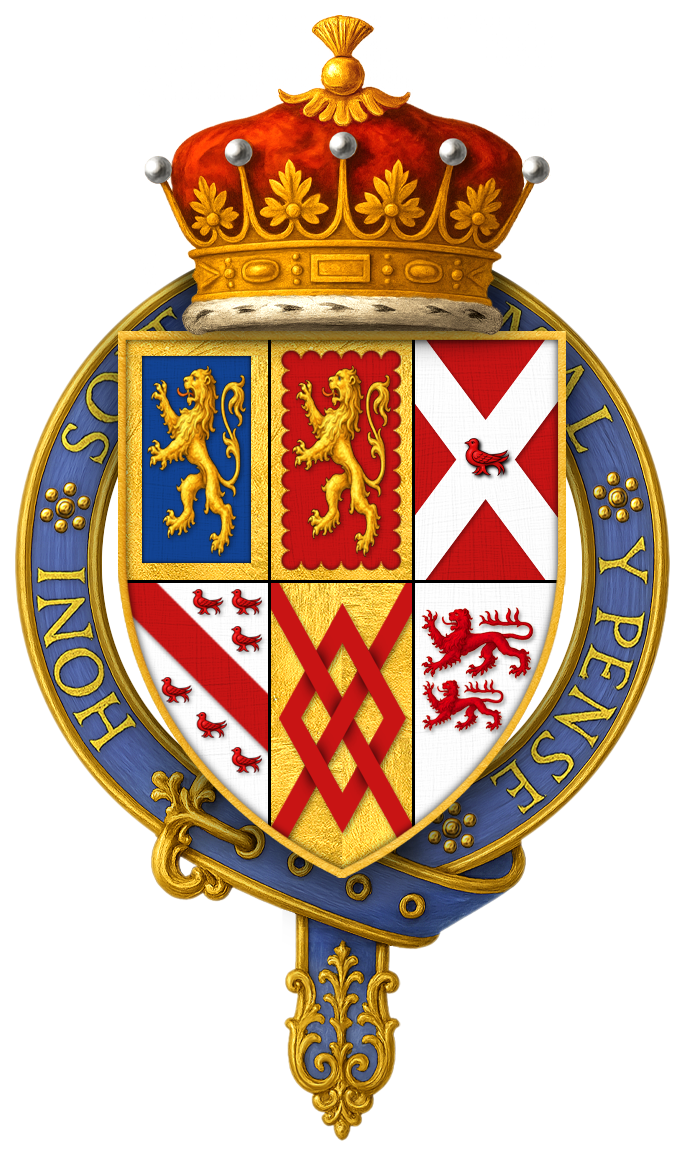
Arms of Sir George Talbot, 4th Earl of Shrewsbury, KG

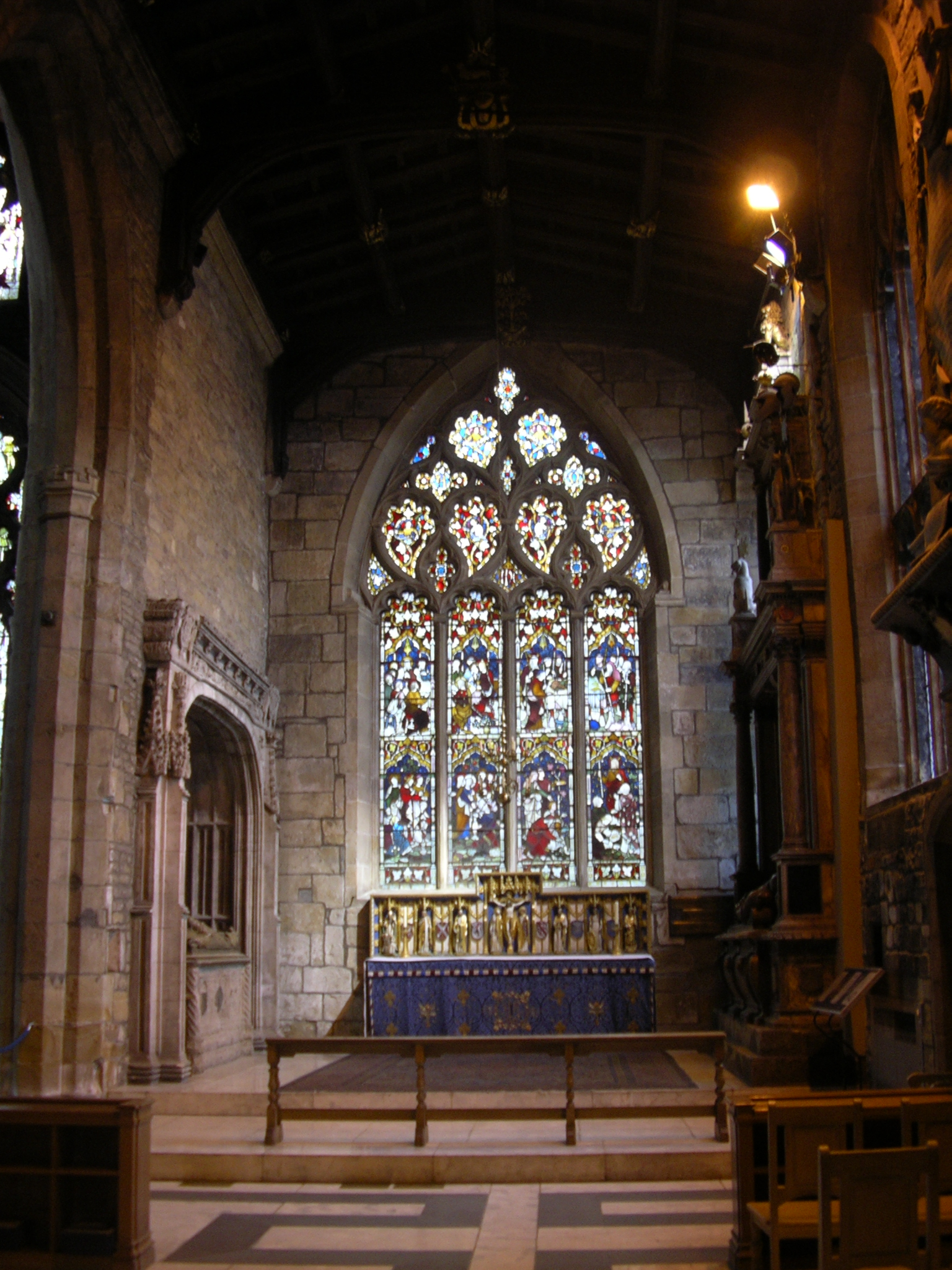
The Shrewsbury Chapel in Sheffield Cathedral; the chapel was commissioned by George Talbot.

Having a large family and being a very wealthy man, he found the castle accommodation extremely cramped. He broke with the tradition of his family and decided to make Sheffield his home, living in the castle built by Lord Furnivall. This castle is best known for later holding Mary, Queen of Scots, prisoner and indeed it was the 6th Earl, the Earl's grandson, who confined her. In 1516, he decided to build himself a country mansion on a hill about two miles away. In 1520, he had a chapel added to the parish church at Sheffield to serve as a family chapel with a burial vault below. This is now known as the Shrewsbury Chapel and now forms a historic part of Sheffield Cathedral.

In 1538, the Earl died, aged 70, while at Wingfield Manor. He was laid to rest in the Shrewsbury Chapel along with his first wife, Lady Anne. In his will, the Earl directed 'that a tomb of marble should be set over his grave with three images thereon, namely one of himself in his mantle of the Garter, another of his deceased wife in her robes, and a third of his wife then living'. The monument to Talbot and his two wives can still be seen in the church (now Sheffield Cathedral).

== Marriage and issue ==
He married before 27 June 1481 at age 13, his second cousin, Lady Anne Hastings, daughter of William Hastings, 1st Baron Hastings, and Katherine Neville. Lady Anne was at court as one of Katherine of Aragon's ladies-in-waiting at the beginning of Henry VIII's reign. Lady Anne was a maternal half-sister of Cecily Bonville, Marchioness of Dorset.

George Talbot and Lady Anne Hastings had 11 children:

- Francis Talbot, later 11th Baron Talbot and 5th Earl of Shrewsbury (c. 1500–1560)
- Lady Elizabeth Talbot (c. 1507–aft. 6 May 1552), married aft. 18 May 1519 William Dacre, 3rd Baron Dacre of Gilsland, and had issue.
- Lady Margaret Talbot (dsp.), married, as his first wife, Henry Clifford, 1st Earl of Cumberland
- Lady Mary Talbot (d. 16 April 1572), married c. Jan 1523/4 Henry Percy, 6th Earl of Northumberland.
- Henry Talbot, styled Lord Talbot (d. young)
- John Talbot (d. young)
- John Talbot (d. young)
- William Talbot, Marshal of Ireland
- Richard Talbot
- Lady Anne Talbot
- Lady Dorothy Talbot

After Anne died, he married secondly Elizabeth Walden (1491 – July 1567), the daughter of Sir Richard Walden. They had two children:

- Lady Anne Talbot (18 March 1523 – 18 July 1588), married first Peter Compton (d. 30 January 1544) and had one son, Henry Compton, 1st Baron Compton; married second William Herbert, 1st Earl of Pembroke.
- John Talbot (d. young)

== Film, fiction, television ==
The Earl of Shrewsbury is depicted by Gavin O'Connor in the Showtime series The Tudors. In the series, the Earl of Shrewsbury is depicted as a much younger man (approximately 30). At the time of the Pilgrimage of Grace in 1536, which is when he is featured in The Tudors, historically he was 70 yrs old. The date also confirms that he had to have been the 4th Earl of Shrewsbury; as titles are passed on only after a noble dies. The Tudors has been known to disregard the real ages of historical figures when casting roles.

He appears briefly in episode 1 of the TV adaptation of Wolf Hall, portrayed by James Laurenson, giving evidence in Henry's favour at the Legatine Court considering the legitimacy of Henry's marriage to Catherine of Aragon. His age is accurately portrayed.

He is a minor character in H. F. M. Prescott's novel The Man on a Donkey, which tells the story of the Pilgrimage of Grace.

== Ancestry ==
Ancestors of George Talbot, 4th Earl of Shrewsbury

16. Richard Talbot, 4th Baron Talbot
8. John Talbot, 1st Earl of Shrewsbury
17. Ankaret le Strange, 7th Baroness Strange of Blackmere
4. John Talbot, 2nd Earl of Shrewsbury
18. Thomas Nevill, 1st Lord Neville of Halumshire
9. Maud Neville, 6th Baroness Furnivall
19. Joan de Furnevalle, 5th Baroness Furnivall
2. John Talbot, 3rd Earl of Shrewsbury
20. James Butler, 3rd Earl of Ormond
10. James Butler, 4th Earl of Ormond
21. Anne Welles, Countess of Ormond
5. Lady Elizabeth Butler
22. William de Beauchamp, 1st Baron Bergavenny
11. Lady Joan Beauchamp
23. Lady Joan FitzAlan
1. George Talbot, 4th Earl of Shrewsbury
24. Hugh de Stafford, 2nd Earl of Stafford
12. Edmund Stafford, 5th Earl of Stafford
25. Philippa de Beauchamp
6. Humphrey Stafford, 1st Duke of Buckingham
26. Thomas of Woodstock, 1st Duke of Gloucester
13. Lady Anne of Woodstock
27. Eleanor de Bohun
3. Lady Catherine Stafford
28. John Neville, 3rd Baron Neville de Raby
14. Ralph Neville, 1st Earl of Westmorland
29. Lady Maud Percy
7. Lady Anne Neville
30. John of Gaunt, 1st Duke of Lancaster
15. Lady Joan Beaufort
31. Katherine Swynford

Political offices
| Preceded by The Earl of Shrewsbury | Lord High Steward of Ireland; 1473–1538 | Succeeded by The Earl of Shrewsbury |
| Preceded by The Lord Willoughby de Broke | Lord Steward; 1502–1538 | Succeeded by The Duke of Suffolk |
Peerage of England
| Preceded by John Talbot | Earl of Shrewsbury; 1473–1538 | Succeeded by Francis Talbot |
| Preceded by John Talbot | Baron Talbot (descended by acceleration); 1473–1538 | Succeeded by Francis Talbot |
Peerage of Ireland
| Preceded by John Talbot | Earl of Waterford; 1473–1538 | Succeeded by Francis Talbot |
