= Maud Francis, Countess of Salisbury =

Maud Francis, Countess of Salisbury (c. 1370 – c. 1424) was daughter of Sir Adam Francis, born c. 1326, Lord Mayor of London, and Agnes Champnes. She was married and widowed three times. Her first husband was John Aubrey (son of another Mayor of London, Andrew Aubrey) and her second Sir Alan Buxhull, KG in 1372.

With Sir Alan Buxhull, she had a son, who was born posthumously, Sir Alan Buxhull II.

Her third husband was John Montacute, 3rd Earl of Salisbury, and they had five children:

- Richard Montacute
- Thomas Montacute, 4th Earl of Salisbury
- Lady Anne Montacute who married Sir Richard II Hankford as his second wife, then Sir Lewis Johan as his second wife and thirdly John Holland, 2nd Duke of Exeter as his third wife. Lady Anne was the mother of Anne Hankford by her first marriage.
- Lady Margaret Montacute
- Lady Elizabeth Montacute

Following the death of Mary de Bohun in 1394, her son, the future Henry V, was given into the care of the Earl and Countess of Salisbury by his father, Henry Bolingbroke, the future King Henry IV of England. They cared for him at the manor of Courtfield in Herefordshire. An effigy in the church at Welsh Bicknor is believed to be that of the countess.

In 1400, the Earl of Salisbury was executed for treason by King Henry IV. In 1420, Maud petitioned King Henry V to have the earl's remains transferred from Cirencester Abbey to Bisham Priory.
