= John Talbot, 3rd Earl of Shrewsbury =

English nobleman (1448–1473)

The Right Honourable John Talbot
- The Earl of Shrewsbury; The Earl of Waterford
- Tenure: 1460–1473
- Predecessor: John Talbot, 2nd Earl of Shrewsbury
- Successor: George Talbot, 4th Earl of Shrewsbury
- Other titles: Baron Talbot; Baron Strange of Blackmere; Baron Furnivall
- Born: 12 December 1448
- Died: 28 June 1473 (aged 24)
- Spouse: Lady Katherine Stafford (m. 1458)
- Issue: George Talbot, 4th Earl of Shrewsbury; Hon. Thomas Talbot; Lady Anne Talbot
- Father: John Talbot, 2nd Earl of Shrewsbury
- Mother: Lady Elizabeth Butler

John Talbot, 3rd Earl of Shrewsbury, 3rd Earl of Waterford, 9th Baron Talbot (12 December 1448 – 28 June 1473) was an English nobleman. He also held the subsidiary titles of 12th Baron Strange of Blackmere and 8th Baron Furnivall. Although a soldier and an administrator, he was described by William of Worcester as 'more devoted to literature and the muses, than to politics and arms'.

== Family origins ==
He was the son of John Talbot, 2nd Earl of Shrewsbury and Lady Elizabeth Butler. His father was killed at the Battle of Northampton on 10 July 1460, fighting for the Lancastrians under Henry VI.

His maternal grandparents were James Butler, 4th Earl of Ormonde, and Joan Beauchamp. Joan was a daughter of William Beauchamp, 1st Baron Bergavenny and Joan Arundel. The senior Joan was a daughter of Richard FitzAlan, 11th Earl of Arundel and Elizabeth de Bohun. Elizabeth was a daughter of William de Bohun, 1st Earl of Northampton.

== Career ==
John Talbot succeeded as 3rd Earl on 10 July 1460. He was 12 years old when knighted on 17 February 1460/61 after the Second Battle of St Albans. He was also present at the Battle of Towton in 1461.

He was also an administrator. He was Commissioner of Oyer and Terminer for Yorkshire, Cumberland, Westmorland and the City of York in 1469 and of Shropshire in 1470. He was appointed chief justice of North Wales on 11 September 1471.

On 6 February 1471/72 he was made special commissioner to treat with Scotland, and again on 16 May 1473.

== Marriage and Family ==
John married Lady Katherine Stafford, daughter of Humphrey Stafford, 1st Duke of Buckingham, and Lady Anne Neville, in 1458. Anne was a daughter of Ralph Neville, 1st Earl of Westmorland, and Joan Beaufort, Countess of Westmorland. John and Catherine were thus the uncle and aunt of Henry Stafford, the 2nd Duke of Buckingham. They had three children:

- George Talbot, 4th Earl of Shrewsbury (c. 1468 – 26 July 1538).
- Thomas Talbot (born 1470).
- Lady Anne Talbot (born 1472), married Thomas Butler.

John died on 28 June 1473 in Coventry and was buried in the Lady chapel at Worksop Priory in Nottinghamshire.

Political offices
Preceded by The 2nd Earl of Shrewsbury	Lord High Steward of Ireland; 1460–1473	Succeeded by The 4th Earl of Shrewsbury
Peerage of England
Preceded by John Talbot	Earl of Shrewsbury; 1460–1473	Succeeded by George Talbot
Peerage of Ireland
Preceded by John Talbot	Earl of Waterford; 1460–1473	Succeeded by George Talbot
