= Alice Holland, Countess of Kent =

English noblewoman

Alice FitzAlan
- Lady Holland; Countess of Kent; Lady of the Garter
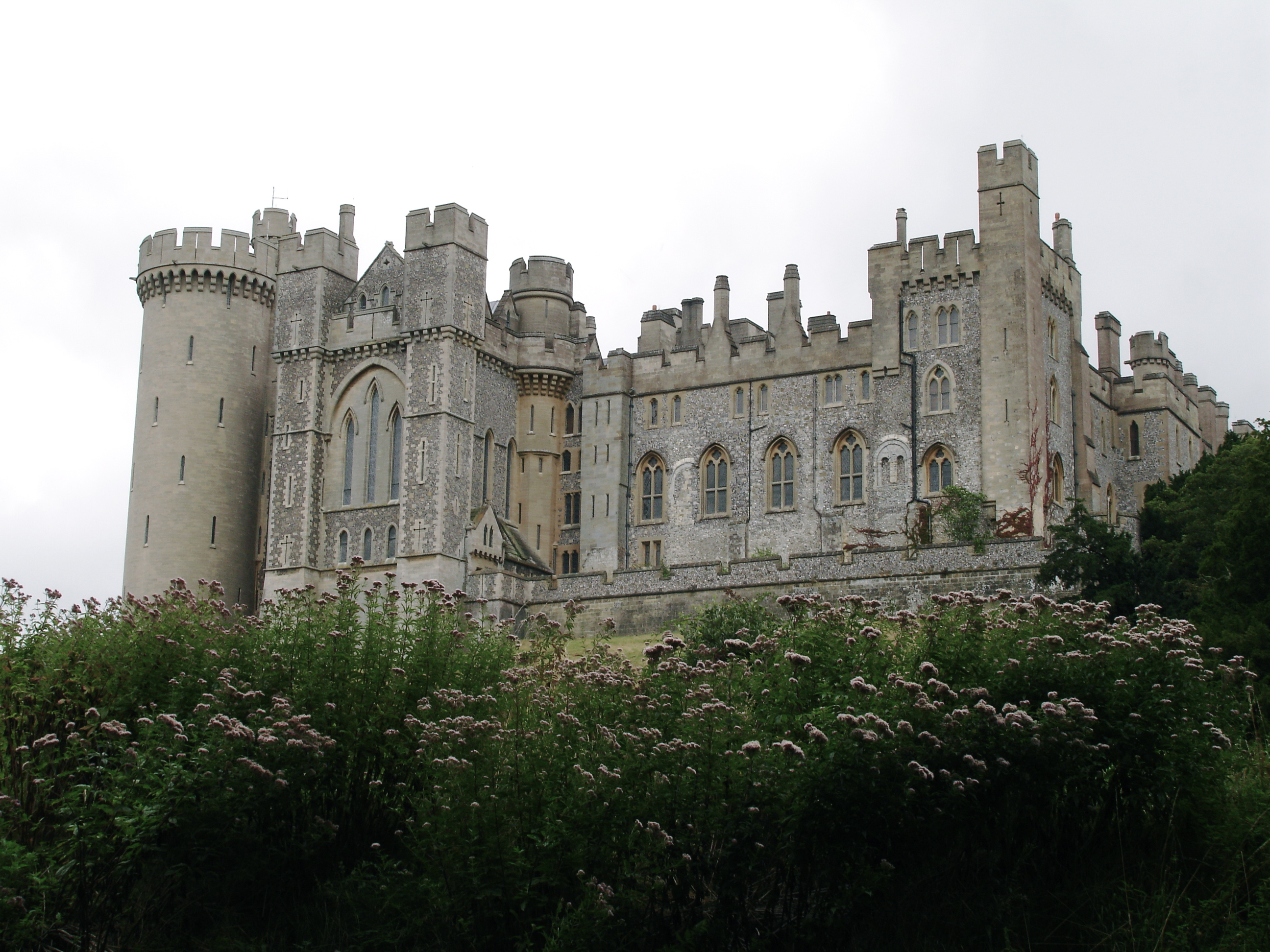
- Arundel Castle, birthplace of Alice FitzAlan and her siblings
- Born: 1350; Arundel Castle, Sussex, England
- Died: 17 March 1416 (aged 66)
- Noble family: FitzAlan (by birth); Holland (by marriage)
- Spouse: Thomas Holland, 2nd Earl of Kent
- Issue more...: Alianore Holland, Countess of March; Thomas Holland, 1st Duke of Surrey and 3rd Earl of Kent; Joan Holland, Duchess of York; Edmund Holland, 4th Earl of Kent; Margaret Holland, Duchess of Clarence; Eleanor Holland, Countess of Salisbury
- Father: Richard Fitzalan, 3rd Earl of Arundel and 8th Earl of Surrey
- Mother: Eleanor of Lancaster

Lady Alice Holland, Countess of Kent (c. 1350 – 17 March 1416), LG, formerly Alice FitzAlan, was an English noblewoman, a daughter of the 3rd Earl of Arundel, and the wife of the 2nd Earl of Kent, the half-brother of King Richard II. As the maternal grandmother of Anne de Mortimer, she was an ancestor of kings Edward IV and Richard III, as well as King Henry VII and the Tudor dynasty through her daughter Margaret Holland. She was also the maternal grandmother of Joan Beaufort, Queen of Scots.

She was appointed a Lady of the Garter in 1388.

== Family ==
Alice FitzAlan was born circa 1350 at Arundel Castle in Sussex, England, the second daughter of the 10th Earl of Arundel, and Eleanor of Lancaster. She had six siblings who included Richard Fitzalan, later 11th Earl of Arundel, and Joan FitzAlan, later Countess of Hereford, Essex, and Northampton. She also had three half-siblings from her parents' previous marriages.

Her paternal grandparents were the 9th Earl of Arundel and Alice de Warenne, and her maternal grandparents were the 3rd Earl of Lancaster and Maud Chaworth.

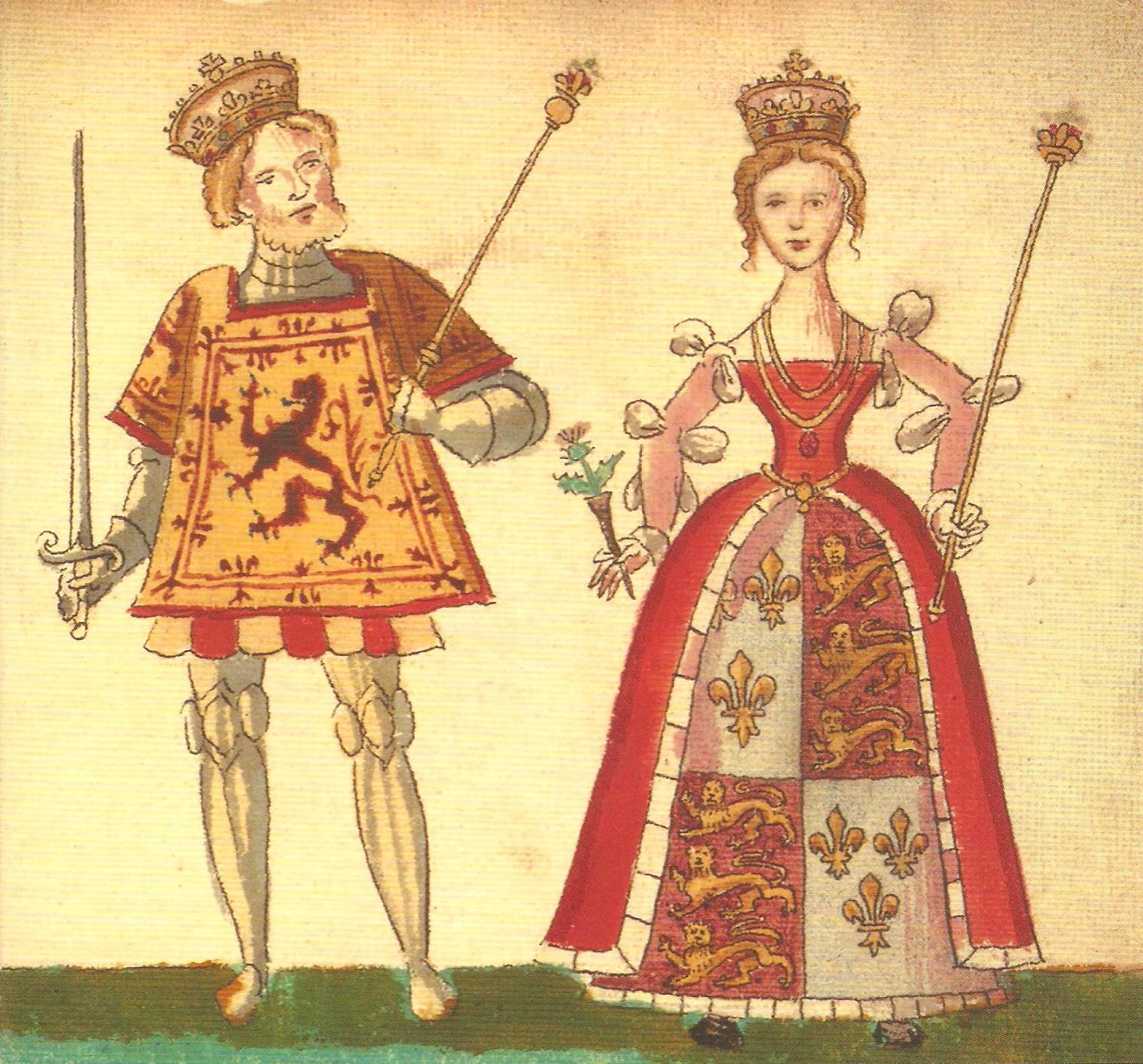
Joan Beaufort, Queen of Scotland was a granddaughter of Lady Alice FitzAlan.

== Marriage and issue ==
In 1354, at the age of four, Alice was betrothed to her father's ward Edmund Mortimer who would in 1360 become the 3rd Earl of March. The marriage, however, did not take place. Alice married instead on 10 April 1364, 2nd Earl of Kent, one of the half-brothers of the future King Richard II by his mother Joan of Kent's first marriage to Thomas Lord Holland. She received from her father a marriage portion of 4,000 marks. Upon her marriage, she was styled Lady Holland. She did not, however, become Countess of Kent until 1381, when her husband succeeded his father as Thomas Holland, 2nd Earl of Kent.

Lord Holland was appointed captain of the English forces in Aquitaine in 1366, and in 1375, he was made a Knight of the Garter. Two years later in 1377, his half-brother Richard succeeded to the throne of England, as King Richard II. Alice's husband would become one of the young King's chief counsellors and exert a strong influence over his brother which led to the enrichment of Thomas and Alice. Alice was appointed a Lady of the Garter, an order of chivalry, in 1388.

Together Thomas and Alice had ten children:

- Alianore Holland (13 October 1370 – October 1405), married, firstly, Roger Mortimer, 4th Earl of March, by whom she had issue, including Anne Mortimer and Edmund Mortimer, 5th Earl of March; she married, secondly, Edward Charleton, 5th Baron Cherleton, by whom she had two daughters.
- Thomas Holland, 1st Duke of Surrey and 3rd Earl of Kent (1374 – 7 January 1400), married Lady Joan Stafford, a daughter of Hugh de Stafford, 2nd Earl of Stafford and Philippa de Beauchamp, but the marriage was childless.
- John Holland (died young)
- Richard Holland (died young)
- Elizabeth Holland (died 4 January 1423), married Sir John Neville, Lord Neville by whom she had issue.
- Joan Holland (1380 – 12 April 1434), married, firstly, as his second wife, Edmund of Langley, 1st Duke of York; married, secondly, William Willoughby, 5th Baron Willoughby de Eresby; married, thirdly, Henry le Scrope, 3rd Baron Scrope of Masham, her fourth husband was Sir Henry Bromflete, Baron Vessy. All her marriages were childless.
- Edmund Holland, 4th Earl of Kent (6 January 1384 – 15 September 1408), married Lucia Visconti (1372 – 14 April 1424), but the marriage was childless. He fathered an illegitimate daughter, Eleanor de Holland (born 1406), by his mistress Constance of York.
- Margaret Holland (1385 – 30 December 1439), married, firstly, John Beaufort, 1st Earl of Somerset, by whom she had issue including John Beaufort, 1st Duke of Somerset and Joan Beaufort, Queen of Scotland; she married, secondly, Thomas of Lancaster, 1st Duke of Clarence.
- Eleanor Holland (1386 – after 1413), married Thomas Montacute, 4th Earl of Salisbury, by whom she had one daughter, Alice Montacute, 5th Countess of Salisbury.
- Bridget Holland (died before 1416), a nun at Barking Abbey.

== Later years ==
Alice's husband died on 25 April 1397. In 1399, King Richard was deposed, and the throne was usurped by Henry IV, the son-in-law of her elder sister, Joan. In January 1400, Alice's eldest son Thomas, who had succeeded his father as the 3rd Earl of Kent, was captured at Cirencester and beheaded without a trial by a mob of angry citizens as a consequence of having been one of the chief conspirators in the Epiphany Rising. The rebels had hoped to seize and murder King Henry, and immediately restore King Richard to the throne. Less than three years earlier, her brother Richard FitzAlan, 11th Earl of Arundel and a Lord Appellant, had been executed for his opposition to King Richard.

Alice herself died on 17 March 1416 at the age of sixty-six. She is buried at Wells Cathedral.

== Descendants ==
Alice had many illustrious descendants which included English kings Edward IV, Richard III (and his consort Queen Anne) and Henry VII, from the latter of whom descended the Tudor monarchs. Alice was also an ancestress of Scottish king James II of Scotland and his successors, which included Mary, Queen of Scots and James I of England. Her other notable descendants include the last queen consort of Henry VIII, Catherine Parr; Richard Neville, 16th Earl of Warwick—known in history as Warwick the Kingmaker; Cecily Bonville; John Tiptoft, 1st Earl of Worcester and the scandalous Anne Bourchier, 7th Baroness Bourchier. Living descendants of Alice FitzAlan include the current British royal family.

== Ancestry ==
Ancestors of Alice Holland, Countess of Kent

John Fitzalan, 7th Earl of Arundel
Richard Fitzalan, 8th Earl of Arundel
Isabella Mortimer
Edmund Fitzalan, 9th Earl of Arundel
Thomas I of Saluzzo
Alice of Saluzzo
Luigia di Ceva
Richard Fitzalan, 10th Earl of Arundel
John de Warenne, 6th Earl of Surrey
William de Warenne
Alice le Brun de Lusignan
Alice de Warenne
Robert de Vere, 5th Earl of Oxford
Joan de Vere
Alice de Sanford
Alice Fitzalan
Henry III of England
Edmund Crouchback, 1st Earl of Lancaster
Eleanor of Provence
Henry, 3rd Earl of Lancaster
Robert I of Artois
Blanche of Artois
Matilda of Brabant
Eleanor of Lancaster
Patrick de Chaworth
Sir Patrick de Chaworth, Lord of Kidwelly
Hawise de Londres
Maud Chaworth
William de Beauchamp, 9th Earl of Warwick
Isabella de Beauchamp
Maud FitzJohn
