= Bisham Abbey =

Listed manor house at Bisham in the English county of Berkshire

Coordinates: 51.556635°N 0.779657°W

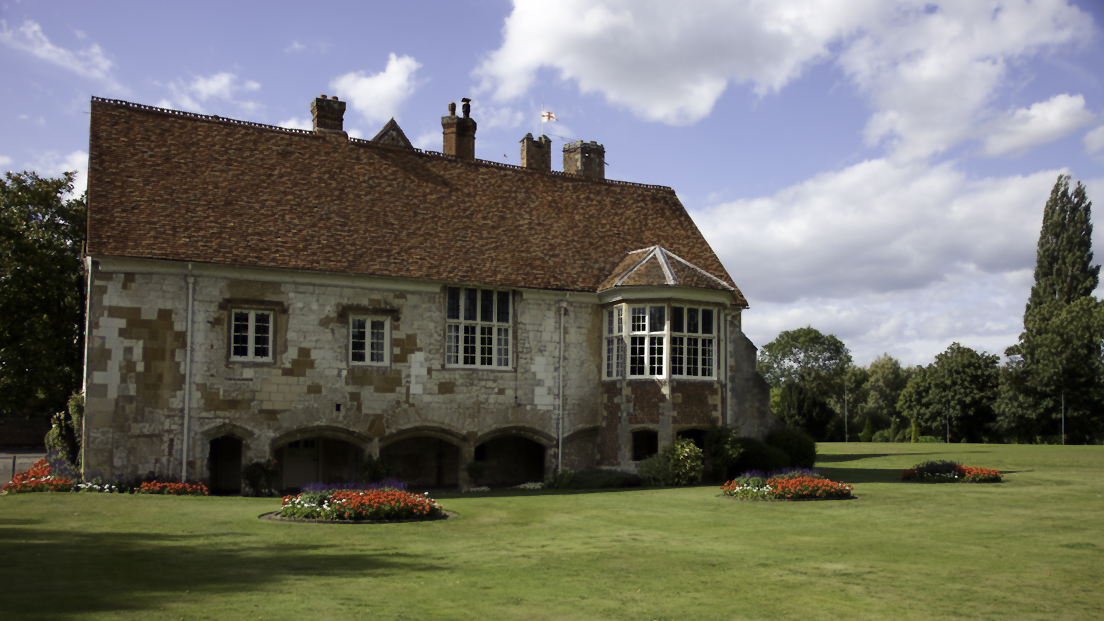
Bisham Abbey Manor House Berkshire

Bisham Abbey is a Grade I listed manor house at Bisham in the English county of Berkshire. The name is taken from the now lost monastery which once stood alongside. This original Bisham Abbey was previously named Bisham Priory, and was the traditional resting place of many Earls of Salisbury. The complex surrounding the extant manorial buildings is now one of three National Sports Centres run on behalf of Sport England and is used as a residential training camp base for athletes and teams and community groups alike. It is a wedding venue with a licence for civil ceremony and is used for conferences, team building events, corporate parties and private functions.

== Manor house ==
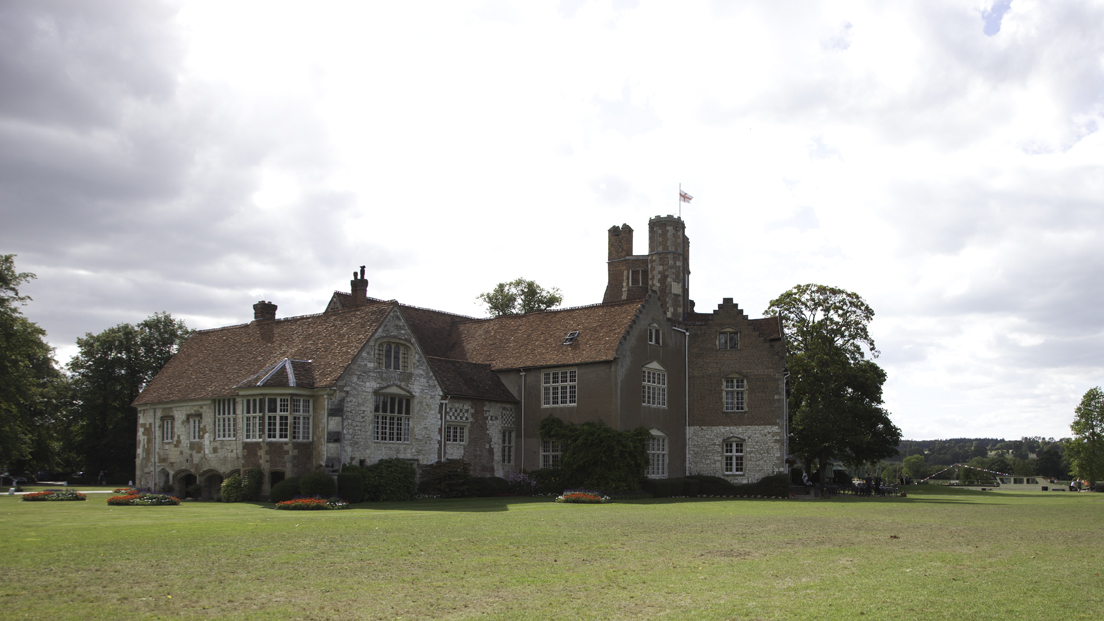
The Manor House

The manor house was built around 1260 as a community house for two Knights Templar. There was substantial rebuilding and alteration in later centuries. When the Templars were suppressed in 1307, King Edward II took over the manorial rights, granting them to various relatives. In 1310 the building was used as a place of confinement for Queen Elizabeth of the Scots, wife of King Robert the Bruce, along with her stepdaughter Princess Marjorie and sister–in–law, Lady Christine of Carrick. They had been captured on the Isle of Rathlin during the Scottish Wars of Succession, and were placed in the charge of the King's Yeoman, John Bentley, for two years, until removed to Windsor.

In 1335 the manor was bought by William Montacute, 1st Earl of Salisbury and in 1337 he founded Bisham Priory alongside, within the year of his death 1344, and he was buried there.

Henry VIII granted the manor house to Anne of Cleves as part of her divorce settlement from him, and it was later bought by the Hoby family, who lived there until 1768. Elizabeth I was a regular visitor in the time of the Hoby family. Anne of Denmark stayed in August 1610. Her arms with the motto La Mia Grandezza dal Eccelso and the arms of her husband James VI and I featured in the stained glass of the parish church, and were later installed in the house. There is a long-standing legend that the house is haunted by the ghost of Dame Elizabeth Hoby, as she purportedly beat her son to death for blotting his copy-book.

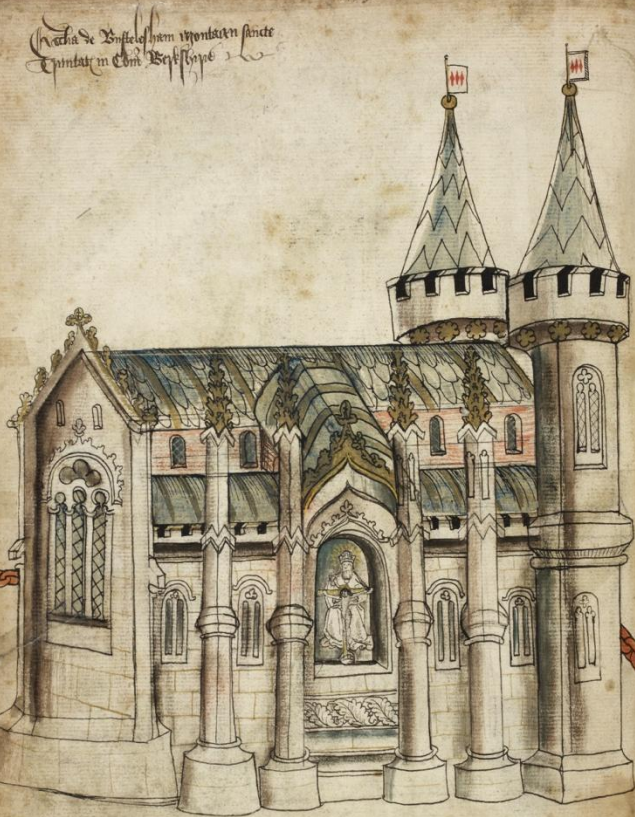
Bisham Priory's Church, as depicted in the Salisbury Roll (1485). Note the Throne of Mercy at the end of the transept.

== Monastery ==
Bisham Priory was built for the Augustinian Canons. The foundation stone laid in 1337, and the brass plaque once affixed to it, can still be seen at Denchworth. When the founder, the 1st Earl of Salisbury, died, he was buried at the priory, as were many later Earls of Salisbury, including Richard Neville, Earl of Warwick, who was buried in April 1471.

Despite holding some relics of Saints Cosmas and Damian, the priory never really became a centre of pilgrimage: many other churches also held relics of the same saints, including two different locations which both claimed to have their skulls.

Bisham Priory was dissolved on 5 July 1537, but six months later, on 18 December, it was refounded as a Benedictine abbey. This was not to last though as it was finally dissolved on 19 June 1538. The abbot of Bisham, John Cordery, is said to have cursed the building thus: "As God is my witness, this property shall ne’er be inherited by two direct successors, for its sons will be hounded by misfortune", as he was dragged from it. Nothing remains of the abbey church or its associated buildings.

== Burials in the Priory/Abbey ==
- Simon de Montagu, 1st Baron Montagu, 1316
- William Montagu, 2nd Baron Montagu, 1319
- William Montagu, 1st Earl of Salisbury, 1344
- Catherine Grandison, Countess of Salisbury, 1349
- William de Montagu, 2nd Earl of Salisbury, 1397
- John Montacute, 3rd Earl of Salisbury, 1400
- Eleanor Holland, Countess of Salisbury, 1413
- Thomas Montagu, 4th Earl of Salisbury, 1428
- Alice Montacute, 5th Countess of Salisbury, 1462
- Richard Neville, 5th Earl of Salisbury, 1463
- Thomas Neville (died 1460), 1463
- John Neville, 1st Marquess of Montagu, 1471, and his wife Isabel Ingoldisthorpe, 1476
- Richard Neville, 16th Earl of Warwick, 1471
- Edward Plantagenet, 17th Earl of Warwick, 1485

== Sports centre ==
The manor house is now run by Serco Leisure Operating Ltd on behalf of Sport England, and is one of three National Sports Centres. Gym membership is open to the public.

The facilities include:-

- A £1.2 million international water based hockey pitch
- An indoor tennis centre featuring four tennis courts
- Four outdoor "French Court" clay tennis courts and four floodlit outdoor acrylic tennis courts
- A fully equipped elite strength and conditioning facility
- Sauna and steam room
- A large community gym with cardio and free weights and full fitness class timetable
- Two squash courts
- A remodelled nine-hole par three golf course
- A sports therapy performance centre which enables elite level sports science and medicine services to be provided on site

The England association football men's senior team trained at Bisham Abbey for 40 years, up until early 2001. England Rugby had their training base at Bisham Abbey until 2005, when they moved to the University of Bath. Several football teams have trained at Bisham Abbey, most recently Barcelona and Portsmouth before their 2008 FA Cup victory. For the last few years Non-League Marlow United F.C. use the pitches as their home ground. The facilities are frequently used by elite athletes and community groups for residential training camps such as the Rugby Sevens and England Hockey. There is an International High performance Tennis centre based on site managed by WIN Tennis. Some professional rugby players use the gym facilities. In February 2006 the England futsal team played two international friendlies against Finland at Bisham Abbey. Due to their regular training ground (Beversbrook) being out of use due to the weather Swindon Town F.C. have been using the centre (as of February 2020) while they attempt to find a more permanent facility.

== Media ==
Bisham Abbey is described in Jerome K. Jerome's 1889 humorous novel Three Men in a Boat.

During the Nationwide Building Society's summer advertising campaign of 2010, when they were official sponsors of the England football team at the World Cup, one of their television advertisements featured the England team playing on one of the pitches at Bisham Abbey. The parish church was clearly visible in the background.
