= William Bonville, 6th Baron Harington =

English nobleman (1442–1460)

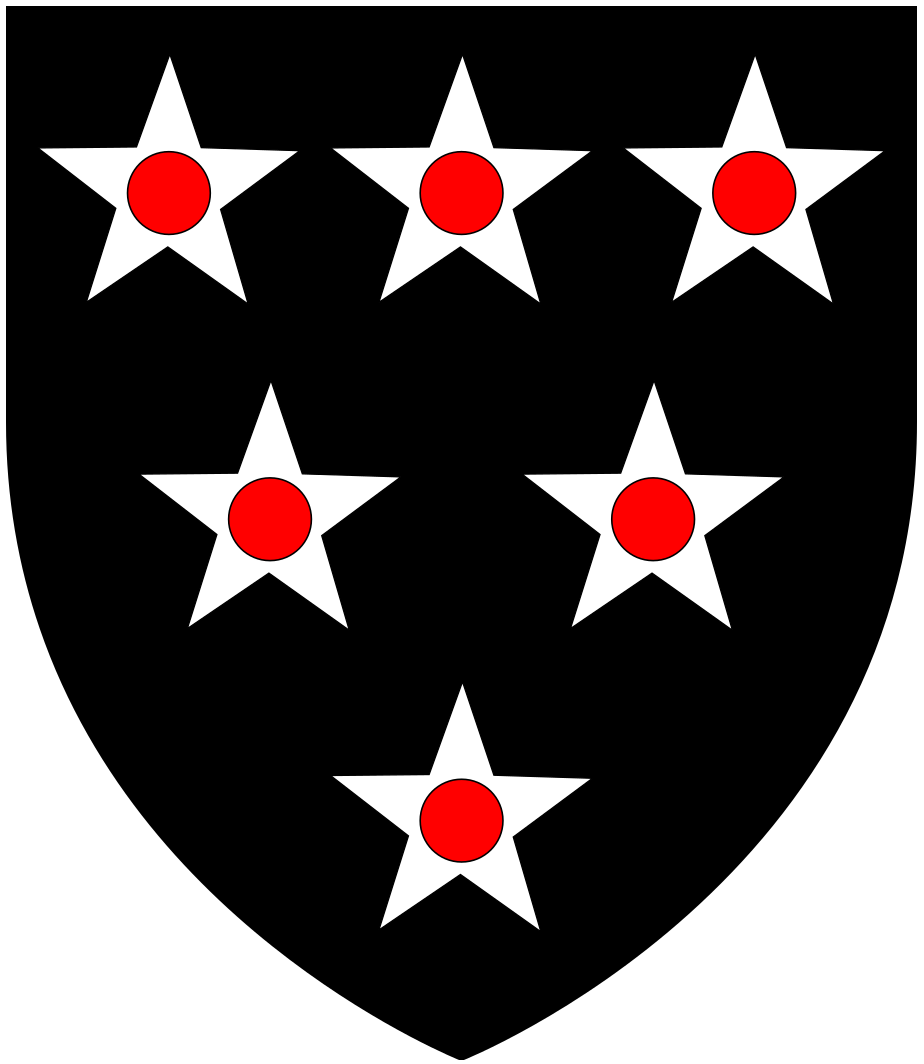
Arms of Bonville: Sable, six mullets argent pierced gules

William Bonville, 6th Baron Harington (1442 – 30 December 1460) was an English nobleman who was a loyal adherent of the House of York during the dynastic conflict in England in the 15th century now known as the Wars of the Roses. He was slain and left dead on the field during the Yorkist defeat at the Battle of Wakefield, leaving his baby daughter, Cecily Bonville heiress to his barony.

== Family ==
William was born in Chewton Mendip, Somerset, England to William Bonville and Elizabeth Harington. His paternal grandparents were William Bonville, 1st Baron Bonville and Margaret Grey. His maternal grandparents were William Harington, 5th Baron Harington of Aldingham (c. 1394 – 1458) and Margaret Hill daughter of Sir John Hill, Justice of the King's Bench.

In 1458, he succeeded his grandfather as the 6th Baron Harington of Aldingham by right of his mother, who had died in her father's lifetime.

== Marriage and death ==
The same year in which he gained his title, William married Lady Katherine Neville, a younger sister of military commander Richard Neville, 16th Earl of Warwick, known as Warwick the Kingmaker. They had one child, Cecily Bonville.

The Bonvilles were loyal adherents of the House of York. William Bonville, 6th Baron Harrington was among the many Yorkists who were slain and left dead on the field during the Battle of Wakefield on 30 December 1460.

His widow, Katherine married secondly William Hastings, 1st Baron Hastings, another Yorkist nobleman, by whom she had six more children. Cecily succeeded to William's barony, becoming the 7th Baroness Harington of Aldingham suo jure, on his death.

== Bibliography ==
- Roskell, J.S. The History of Parliament: The House of Commons 1386-1421. Vol. 2. (Stroud: Alan Sutton Publishing, 1993).
- Seward, Desmond. A Brief History of the Wars of the Roses. (London: Constable and Robin, 2007).
- Jones, Dan. The Hollow Crown: The Wars of the Roses and the Rise of the Tudors. (London: Faber & Faber, 2014).

Peerage of England
Preceded by William Harington	Baron Harington; 1458–1460	Succeeded by Cecily Bonville
