= Eleanor Holland, Countess of Salisbury =

Countess of Salisbury

Eleanor Holland
- Countess of Salisbury
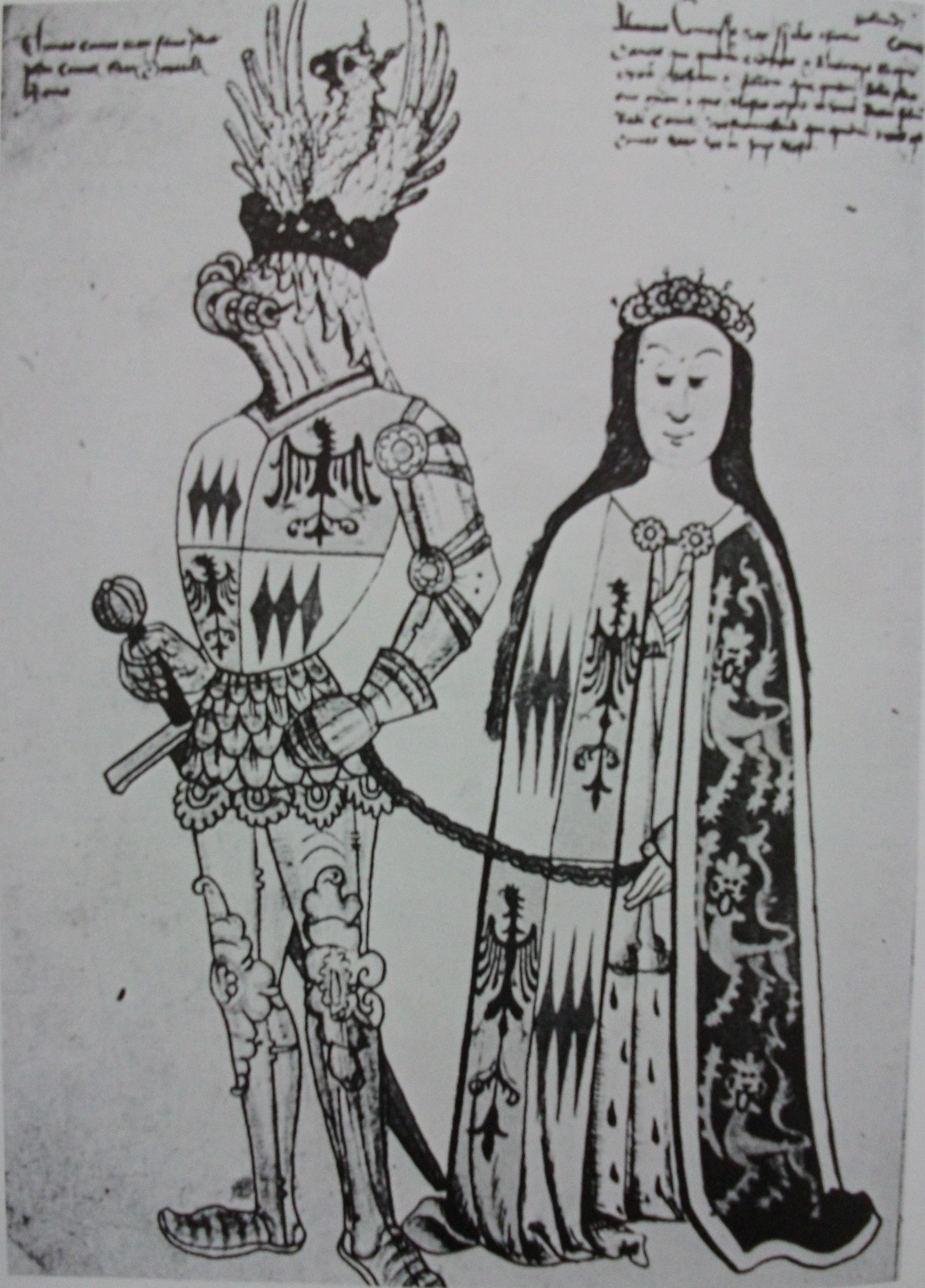
- Eleanor Holland and her husband, Sir Thomas Montacute. (Wrythe Garter Book)
- Born: 1386; Upholland, Lancashire, England
- Died: After. 1413; Bisham Manor, Berkshire, England
- Noble family: Holland
- Spouse: Thomas Montagu, 4th Earl of Salisbury
- Issue: Alice Montacute, 5th Countess of Salisbury
- Father: Thomas Holland, 2nd Earl of Kent
- Mother: Lady Alice FitzAlan

Eleanor Holland, Countess of Salisbury (1386 – aft.1413), was an English noblewoman, the daughter of Thomas Holland, 2nd Earl of Kent, a half-brother of King Richard II of England. She was the first wife of Thomas Montagu, 4th Earl of Salisbury. One of her brothers was Edmund Holland, 4th Earl of Kent, to whom she was co-heiress. She is not to be confused with her eldest sister Alianore Holland, Countess of March who bore the same name.

== Family ==
Lady Eleanor Holland was born in 1386 in Upholland, Lancashire, England, one of the ten children of Thomas Holland, 2nd Earl of Kent and Lady Alice FitzAlan, sister of Richard Fitzalan, 11th Earl of Arundel. Eleanor's eldest sister, Lady Alianore Holland, Countess of March who married Roger Mortimer, 4th Earl of March shared the same name. They were named after their maternal grandmother. Eleanor's father was the half-brother of King Richard II. Her eldest brother Thomas Holland, 1st Duke of Surrey was beheaded in 1400 by a mob of angry citizens at Cirencester for his role in the Epiphany Rising, which was aimed against the life of King Henry IV of England, who had usurped the throne of King Richard. Thomas's heir to the earldom of Kent was her second eldest brother Edmund Holland, to whom Eleanor became co-heiress.

Her paternal grandparents were Thomas Holland, 1st Earl of Kent and Joan of Kent, who was the mother of King Richard by her second marriage to Edward the Black Prince; and her maternal grandparents were Richard Fitzalan, 10th Earl of Arundel and Eleanor of Lancaster.

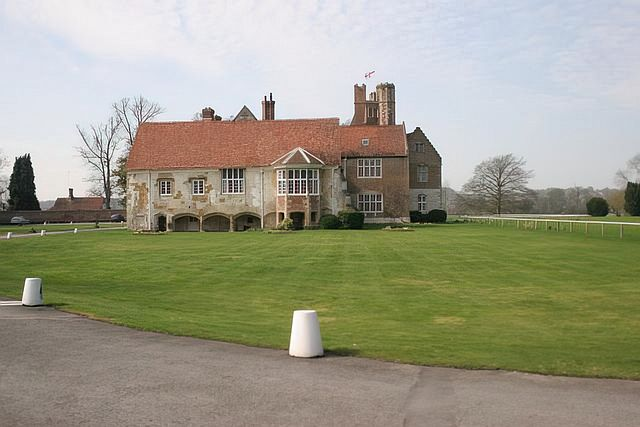
Bisham Manor, the home of Eleanor Holland and Thomas Montacute.

== Marriage and issue ==
Lady Eleanor married Sir Thomas Montagu, son of John Montagu, 3rd Earl of Salisbury and Maud Francis, on 23 May 1399, as his first wife. She was about thirteen years old at the time of her marriage. Thomas would later become one of the most important commanders in the Hundred Years War. Eleanor did not assume the title of Countess of Salisbury until 14 June 1409, when the title, Earl of Salisbury, was nominally restored to Thomas. An attainder had been placed on his father's title and estates following his execution for his participation in the Epiphany Rising in 1400 alongside Eleanor's brother, Thomas. Eleanor's uncle John Holland, 1st Duke of Exeter had also been part of the conspiracy but he had escaped the mob only to be captured in Essex and decapitated on the orders of her maternal aunt Joan Fitzalan, mother-in-law of King Henry IV.

Thomas and Eleanor made their home at Bisham Manor in Berkshire. Together they had one daughter:

- Alice Montagu, 5th Countess of Salisbury (1407 – 3 April/9 December 1462), married in 1420, Richard Neville, by whom she had ten surviving children.

Eleanor died on an unknown date sometime after 1413. She was buried in Bisham Priory.

Thomas married secondly before 1424, Alice Chaucer, granddaughter of the noted author Geoffrey Chaucer, but their marriage was childless. He was mortally wounded on 27 October 1428 at the Siege of Orléans and died several days later on 3 November.

Alice, the daughter of Thomas and Eleanor, succeeded her father as suo jure 5th Countess of Salisbury. Through Alice, Eleanor was the grandmother of Richard Neville, 16th Earl of Warwick and great-grandmother of Cecily Bonville, who became one of the wealthiest English heiresses in the 15th century. Eleanor was also the great-great-great-grandmother of Queen Consort Katherine Parr, the sixth and final wife of King Henry VIII.

== Ancestry ==
Ancestors of Eleanor Holland, Countess of Salisbury

Sir Robert de Holland
Robert de Holland, 1st Baron Holand
Elizabeth de Samlesbury
Thomas Holland, 1st Earl of Kent
Alan la Zouche, 1st Baron la Zouche of Ashby
Maud la Zouche
Eleanor de Segrave
Thomas Holland, 2nd Earl of Kent
Edward I of England
Edmund of Woodstock, 1st Earl of Kent
Marguerite of France
Joan of Kent
John Wake, 1st Baron Wake of Liddell
Margaret Wake, 3rd Baroness Wake of Liddell
Joan de Fiennes
Eleanor Holland
Richard Fitzalan, 8th Earl of Arundel
Edmund Fitzalan, 9th Earl of Arundel
Alice of Saluzzo
Richard Fitzalan, 10th Earl of Arundel
William de Warenne
Alice de Warenne
Joan de Vere
Lady Alice FitzAlan
Edmund Crouchback, 1st Earl of Lancaster
Henry, 3rd Earl of Lancaster
Blanche of Artois
Eleanor of Lancaster
Sir Patrick de Chaworth, Lord of Kidwelly
Maud Chaworth
Isabella de Beauchamp
