= William Hastings, 1st Baron Hastings =

English nobleman (c. 1431–1483)

The Right Honourable The Lord Hastings KG
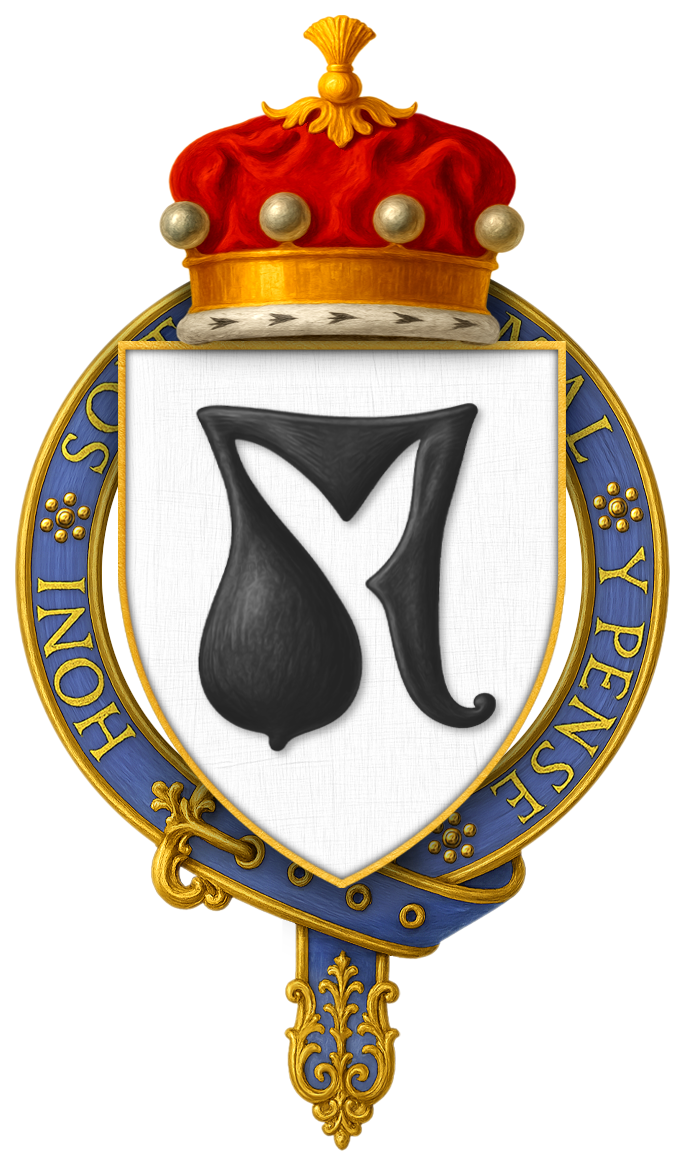
- Arms of William Hastings, 1st Baron Hastings, KG

Lord Chamberlain of the Household
- In office 1461–1483; Vacant 1470–1471
- Monarch: Edward IV
- Preceded by: The Earl of Salisbury
- Succeeded by: The Viscount Lovell

Personal details
- Born: c. 1431
- Died: 13 June 1483 Tower of London, London, England
- Spouse: Katherine Neville
- Children: Edward Hastings, 2nd Baron Hastings; Sir William Hastings; Sir Richard Hastings; George Hastings; Anne Hastings, Countess of Shrewsbury; Elizabeth Hastings
- Parent(s): Sir Leonard Hastings; Alice Camoys

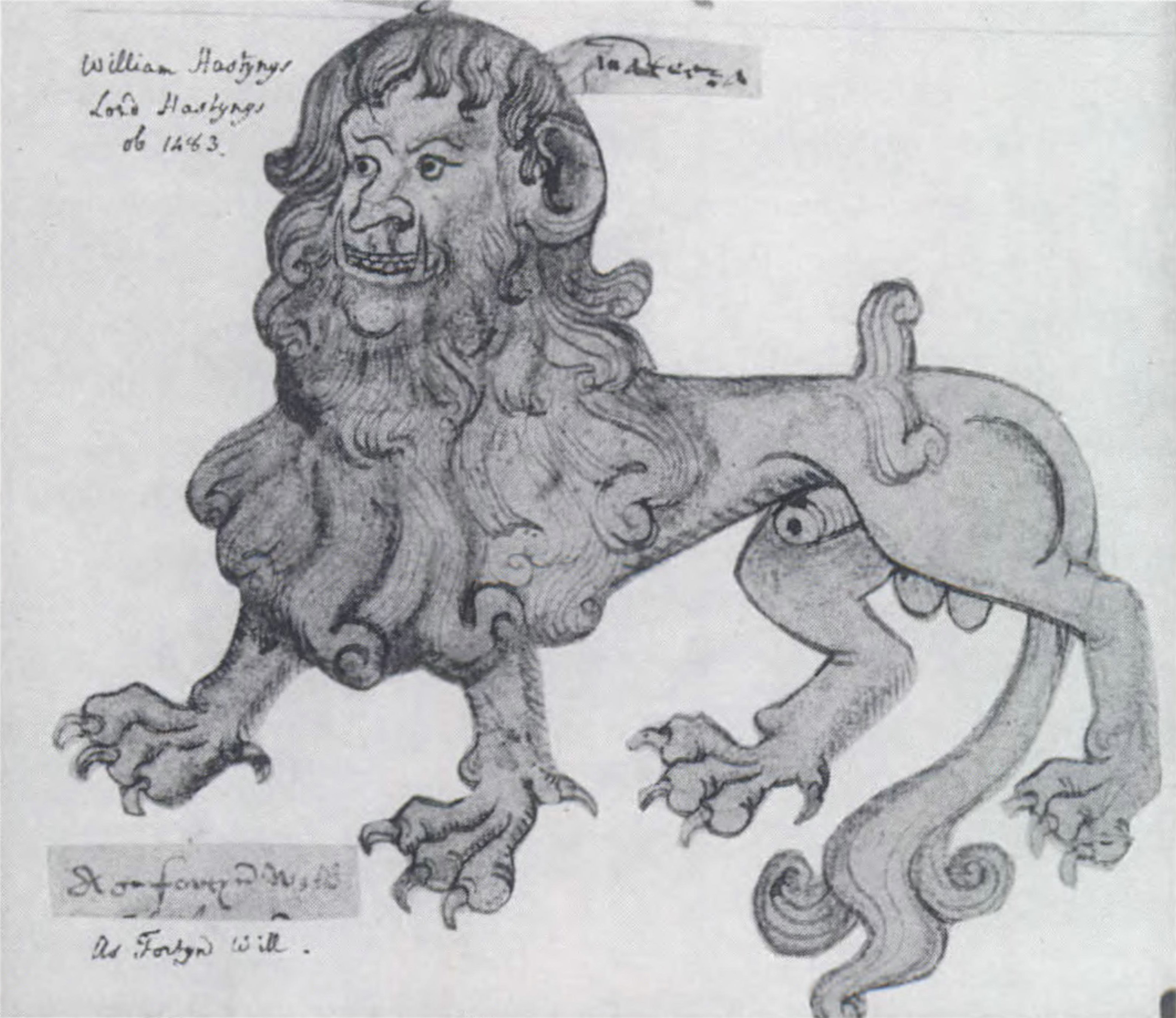
Manticore badge of William, Lord Hastings, c.1470.

William Hastings, 1st Baron Hastings (c. 1431 – 13 June 1483) was an English nobleman. A loyal follower of the House of York during the Wars of the Roses, he became a close friend and one of the most important courtiers of King Edward IV, whom he served as Lord Chamberlain. At the time of Edward's death he was one of the most powerful and richest men in England. He was summarily executed following accusations of treason by Edward's brother and ultimate successor, Richard III. The date of his death is disputed; early histories give 13 June, which is the traditional date.

== Biography ==
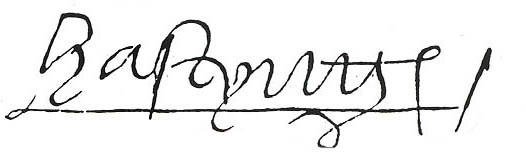
Signature of William Lord Hastings

William Hastings, born about 1430–1431, was the eldest son of Sir Leonard Hastings, and his wife Alice Camoys, daughter of Thomas de Camoys, 1st Baron Camoys. (Note: Sir Leonard Hastings (c.1396 – 20 October 1455) was a member of the English gentry who moved his seat to Leicestershire from Yorkshire where the family had long been established. His wife was Alice Camoys, daughter of Thomas de Camoys, 1st Baron Camoys, and his first wife, Elizabeth Louches, the daughter and heiress of William Louches. Sir Leonard Hastings had three other sons and three daughters: Richard Hastings, Baron Welles (d.1503), also styled Lord Willoughby, who married firstly, before 1 June 1470 Joan Welles, only daughter of Richard de Welles, 7th Baron Welles, by his first wife, Joan Willoughby, only daughter of Robert Willoughby, 6th Baron Willoughby de Eresby, and secondly Joan Romondbye (d. 20 March 1505), widow of Richard Pigot, (died c. 15 April 1483), Serjeant-at-law.; Sir Ralph Hastings (d.1495) of Harrowden, Northamptonshire, who married Amy Tattershall, daughter and heiress of John Tattershall, esquire, of Woolwich, Kent, and Wanstead, Essex, by whom he had six daughters.; Thomas Hastings.; Elizabeth Hastings (c.1450 – 1508), who married, before 1465, Sir John Donne (1450–1503) of Kidwelly, Carmarthenshire, third son of Griffith Donne of Kidwelly by Janet, daughter of Sir John Scudamore, and by him had two sons, Sir Edward Donne (c.1482 – 1552) and Sir Griffith Donne (c.1487 – 1543), and two daughters, Anne Donne (c.1471 – c. 1507), who was the first wife of Sir William Rede of Boarstall, Buckinghamshire, and Margaret Donne (born c.1480), who married Edward Trussell (c.1478 – 16 June 1499) of Elmesthorpe, and was the mother of Elizabeth Trussell (1496–1527), wife of John de Vere, 15th Earl of Oxford.; Anne Hastings, who married Thomas Ferrers, esquire.; Joan Hastings, who married John Brokesby, esquire.) Hastings succeeded his father in service to the House of York and through this service became close to his distant cousin the future Edward IV, whom he was to serve loyally all his life. He was High Sheriff of Warwickshire and High Sheriff of Leicestershire in 1455.

He fought alongside Edward at the Battle of Mortimer's Cross in Herefordshire in the Wars of the Roses, and was present at the proclamation of Edward as king in London on 4 March 1461, and then when the new king secured his crown at the Battle of Towton shortly thereafter. He was knighted on the field of battle. With the establishment of the Yorkist regime, Hastings became one of the key figures in the realm, most importantly as Master of the Mint and Lord Chamberlain, an office he held for the duration of the reign, and which made him one of the most important means of access to the king. He was also created Baron Hastings, a title reinforced by grants of land and office, primarily in Leicestershire and Northamptonshire. In 1462, he was invested as a Knight of the Garter. Hastings' tenure as Master of the Mint occurred during the Great Bullion Famine and the Great Slump in England.

In 1474, he was awarded royal licence to crenellate at three of his landholdings in Leicestershire; at Ashby-de-la-Zouch, Kirby Muxloe, and at Bagworth. He built extensively at Ashby, mostly making additions to the pre-existing manor house built by the de la Zouch family in the thirteenth century. His greatest achievement at Ashby was the Hastings Tower. At Kirby Muxloe Castle he began an intricate fortified house of red brick, one of the first of its kind in the county. Thanks to English Heritage, the castles at Ashby and Kirby can still be seen, but nothing survives to indicate any construction at Bagworth.

His importance in these years is recorded in a number of sources, and was recognised by the greatest peer in the realm, Richard Neville, Earl of Warwick. In 1462, Warwick arranged for Hastings to marry his widowed sister, Katherine Neville. (Katherine's first husband, Lord Bonville, had been killed at St Albans in 1461, and their infant daughter, Cecily, succeeded to the Bonville titles and estates.)

Despite this matrimonial relationship with the Nevilles, when Warwick drove Edward IV into exile in 1470, Hastings went with Edward, and accompanied the king back the following spring. Hastings raised troops for Edward in the English Midlands and served as one of the leading captains of the Yorkist forces at both Barnet and Tewkesbury.

His service, loyalty and ability, along with the fall of his Neville in-laws, made Hastings even more important during the second half of Edward IV's reign. He continued to serve as Chamberlain, and was awarded the position of Chamberlain of the Exchequer in 1471, which he held until 1483. He was also appointed Lieutenant of Calais, which made him an important player in foreign affairs, and given authority over an increasingly large section of the English Midlands. At court, he was involved in two lengthy feuds with members of Queen Elizabeth Woodville's family, most notably with her son Thomas Grey, first Marquess of Dorset. A mistress of both Grey and Hastings was Jane Shore; Grey's wife was the wealthy heiress Cecily Bonville, 7th Baroness Harington, who also happened to be Hastings' stepdaughter. Shore was instrumental in bringing about the alliance between Hastings and the Woodvilles, which was formed while Richard, Duke of Gloucester, was Protector, before he took the throne as King Richard III. She was accused of carrying messages between Hastings and Edward IV's widow, Elizabeth Woodville. It was because of her role in this alliance that Shore was charged with conspiracy, along with Hastings and the Woodvilles, against the Protector's government.

== Death ==
After the death of Edward IV on 9 April 1483, the Dowager Queen appointed family members to key positions and rushed to expedite the coronation of her young son Edward V as king, circumventing Richard, Duke of Gloucester, whom the late king had appointed Lord Protector. Hastings, who had long been friendly with Richard and hostile to the Woodvilles, was a key figure in checking the Dowager Queen's manoeuvres. While keeping the Woodvilles in check in London, Hastings kept Richard closely informed of their proceedings and asked him to hasten to London. Richard met up with the young king and his party as pre-arranged, who was on his way to London, with his Woodville relatives. Hastings then supported Richard's formal installation as Lord Protector and collaborated closely with him in the royal council.

Affairs changed dramatically on 13 June 1483 during a council meeting at the Tower of London: according to contemporaries, Richard, supported by the Duke of Buckingham, accused Hastings and two other council members of having committed high treason by conspiring against his life with the Woodvilles. The contemporary (1483) account of Dominic Mancini records Richard's claim that those who were arrested "had come with concealed weapons so that they could be the first to unleash a violent attack"; this was later confirmed in a public proclamation. While the other alleged conspirators were imprisoned, Hastings was beheaded. The timing of his execution is disputed, although Charles Ross, in his biography of Richard III, argued for the traditional date of 13 June. This date is confirmed by the inquisitions post mortem for Richard's reign.

Despite the accusation of treason, no attainder was issued against Lord Hastings which again suggests a trial by the Court of Chivalry which had no power to attaint. Hence, his wife and sons were allowed to inherit his lands and properties. Hastings was buried in the north aisle of St George's Chapel, Windsor, next to his friend King Edward IV.

== In literature ==
He is portrayed in two of Shakespeare's plays: Henry VI, Part 3 and Richard III.

In Laurence Olivier's film version of Richard III (1955), Lord Hastings is played by actor Alec Clunes.

In Al Pacino's documentary Looking for Richard, Lord Hastings is played by actor Kevin Conway.

== Family ==
Hastings married, before 6 February 1462, Katherine Neville, sister of Richard Neville, Earl of Warwick, known as "Warwick the Kingmaker," and widow of William Bonville, 6th Baron Harington, slain at the Battle of Wakefield on 30 December 1460, by whom he had had four sons and two daughters:

- Edward Hastings, 2nd Baron Hastings, who married Mary Hungerford.
- Sir William Hastings.
- Sir Richard Hastings, who married, and had two daughters and coheirs, Elizabeth Hastings, who married John Beaumont of Gracedieu, Leicestershire, Master of the Rolls, and Mary Hastings, who married Thomas Saunders of Harringworth, Northamptonshire.
- George Hastings.
- Anne Hastings, who married her father's ward, George Talbot, 4th Earl of Shrewsbury.
- Elizabeth Hastings, who married Sir John Beaumont, Master of the Rolls.

== Sources ==
- Acheson, Eric (1992). A Gentry Community; Leicestershire in the Fifteenth Century, c.1422-c.1485. Cambridge: Cambridge University Press. ISBN 9780521524988.
- Burke, John (1831). A General and Heraldic Dictionary of the Peerages of England, Ireland and Scotland, Extinct, Dormant and in Abeyance. London: Henry Colburn. p. 562.
- Cokayne, George Edward (1926). The Complete Peerage, edited by Vicary Gibbs. Vol. VI. London: St. Catherine Press.
- Cokayne, George Edward (1959). The Complete Peerage, edited by Geoffrey H. White. Vol. XII, Part II. London: St. Catherine Press.
- Horrox, Rosemary (2004). "Hastings, William, first Baron Hastings (c.1430–1483)". Oxford Dictionary of National Biography (online ed.). Oxford University Press. doi:10.1093/ref:odnb/12588. (Subscription, Wikipedia Library access or UK public library membership required.)
- Nicolas, Nicholas Harris (1826). Testamenta Vetusta. Vol. I. London: Nicholas and Son. pp. 368–75.
- Nicolas, Nicholas Harris (1836). Testamenta Vetusta. Vol. II. London: Nicholas and Son. p. 421.
- Richardson, Douglas (2011). Everingham, Kimball G. (ed.). Magna Carta Ancestry: A Study in Colonial and Medieval Families. Vol. I (2nd ed.). Salt Lake City. ISBN 978-1-4499-6637-9.
- Richardson, Douglas (2011). Everingham, Kimball G. (ed.). Magna Carta Ancestry: A Study in Colonial and Medieval Families. Vol. II (2nd ed.). Salt Lake City. ISBN 978-1-4499-6638-6.
- Richardson, Douglas (2011). Everingham, Kimball G. (ed.). Magna Carta Ancestry: A Study in Colonial and Medieval Families. Vol. IV (2nd ed.). Salt Lake City. ISBN 978-1-4609-9270-8.

Peerage of England
| New title | Baron Hastings; 1461–1483 | Succeeded by Edward Hastings |
Political offices
| Preceded by The Earl of Salisbury | Lord Chamberlain; 1461–1470 | Vacant |
| Vacant | Lord Chamberlain; 1471–1483 | Succeeded by The Viscount Lovell |
| Preceded by Sir Richard Tonstall | Master of the Mint; 1461–1483 | Succeeded by Robert Brackenbury |
