= Thomas Montagu, 4th Earl of Salisbury =

English nobleman and military commander (1388–1428)

Thomas Montagu
- 4th Earl of Salisbury
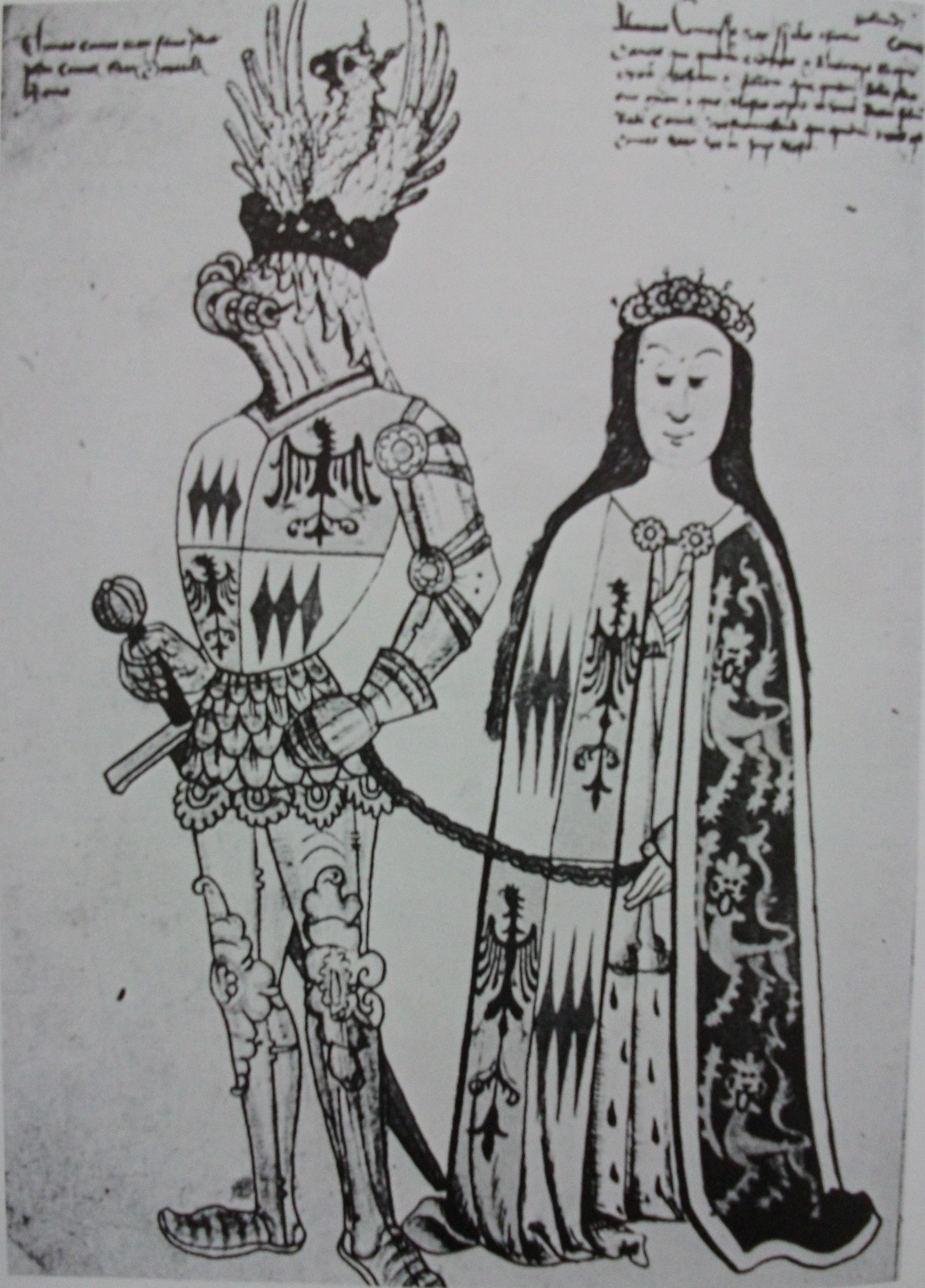
- Thomas Montagu, 4th Earl of Salisbury and his wife Lady Eleanor Holland (Wrythe Garter Book). On her mantle she displays her husband's arms (as displayed on his breastplate) impaling her paternal arms (Thomas Holland, 2nd Earl of Kent) Plantagenet with a bordure argent.
- Tenure: from 14 June 1409
- Predecessor: John Montacute, 3rd Earl of Salisbury
- Successor: Richard Neville, 5th Earl of Salisbury
- Other titles: 6th and 3rd Baron Montagu; 5th Baron Monthermer; Count of Perche
- Years active: 1414–1428
- Born: 13 June 1388
- Died: 3 November 1428 (aged 40); Meung-sur-Loire, France
- Cause of death: Died of wounds
- Buried: Bisham Abbey, Berkshire
- Residence: Bisham manor, Berkshire
- Wars and battles: Hundred Years' War • Battle of Agincourt (1415) • Battle of Baugé (1421) • Battle of Cravant (1423) • Battle of Verneuil (1424) • Siege of Orléans (1428) †
- Spouses: Eleanor Holland; Alice Chaucer, Duchess of Suffolk
- Issue: Alice Montacute, 5th Countess of Salisbury
- Parents: John Montagu, 3rd Earl of Salisbury; Maud Francis

Thomas Montagu, 4th Earl of Salisbury, KG (13 June 1388 – 3 November 1428) of Bisham in Berkshire, was an English nobleman and one of the most important English commanders during the Hundred Years' War.

== Origins ==
Arms of Thomas Montagu, 4th Earl of Salisbury: Quarterly, 1st & 4th: Argent, three fusils conjoined in fess gules (Montagu); 2nd & 3rd: Or, an eagle displayed vert beaked and membered gules (Monthermer)

He was the eldest son of John Montagu, 3rd Earl of Salisbury (died 1400), who was killed while plotting against King Henry IV in 1400, and his lands forfeited. The lands were partly retrieved by Thomas in 1409, and fully in 1421. His mother was Maud Francis, widow of Sir Alan Buxhull KG, daughter of Sir Adam Francis (born c. 1334), Mayor of London.

== Career ==
Thomas was summoned to Parliament as Earl of Salisbury in 1409, although he was not formally invested as earl until 1421. In 1414, he was made a Knight of the Garter. In July 1415, he was one of the seven peers who tried Richard, Earl of Cambridge on charges of conspiring against King Henry V. Montagu then joined King Henry V in France, where he fought at the siege of Harfleur and at the Battle of Agincourt. Montagu fought in various other campaigns in France in the following years. In 1419 he held an independent command, and was appointed lieutenant-general of Normandy and created Count of Perche, as part of Henry V's policy of creating Norman titles for his followers.

Although he was employed on some diplomatic missions, he took almost no part in politics and spent most of the rest of his life as a soldier in France, leading troops in the various skirmishes and sieges that were central to that part of the Hundred Years' War. In 1423, he was appointed governor of Champagne, and in 1425, he captured the city of Le Mans. After a year in England, he returned to a position of command in 1428, and fought at the siege of Orléans, at which he lost his life on 3 November of that year.

== Marriages and children ==
He married twice:

- Firstly, to Eleanor Holland, a sister and eventual co-heiress of Edmund Holland, 4th Earl of Kent, and daughter of Thomas Holland, 2nd Earl of Kent. By Eleanor he had a daughter, his only legitimate child: Alice Montagu, who married Richard Neville, who later succeeded his father-in-law jure uxoris as Earl of Salisbury.
- Secondly, to Alice Chaucer, daughter of Thomas Chaucer and granddaughter of the poet Geoffrey Chaucer.

== Siblings ==
Richard Montacute,

Thomas Montacute, 4th Earl of Salisbury

Lady Anne Montacute who married Sir Richard II Hankford as his second wife, then Sir Lewis Johan as his second wife and thirdly John Holland, 2nd Duke of Exeter as his third wife. Lady Anne was the mother of Anne Hankford by her first marriage.

Lady Margaret Montacute

Lady Elizabeth Montacute

Sir Alan Buxhull II, Half Brother

=== Illegitimate son ===
He had an illegitimate son John (or James) Montagu/Montacute, to whom he bequeathed his manor of Luddesdown in Kent. It is suggested in Collins Peerage that he was the ancestor of the family of Montagu of Boughton House, Northamptonshire (which uses the coat of arms and quarterings of the Montagu Earls of Salisbury, but differenced by a bordure sable), which includes Montagu, Duke of Montagu; Montagu, Earl of Manchester; Montagu, Earl of Sandwich, etc., whose earliest proven ancestor was Thomas Montagu (d. 1516) of Hemington, Northamptonshire, the grandfather of Sir Edward Montagu (1530–1602), Lord Chief Justice, who purchased Boughton.

== Death ==
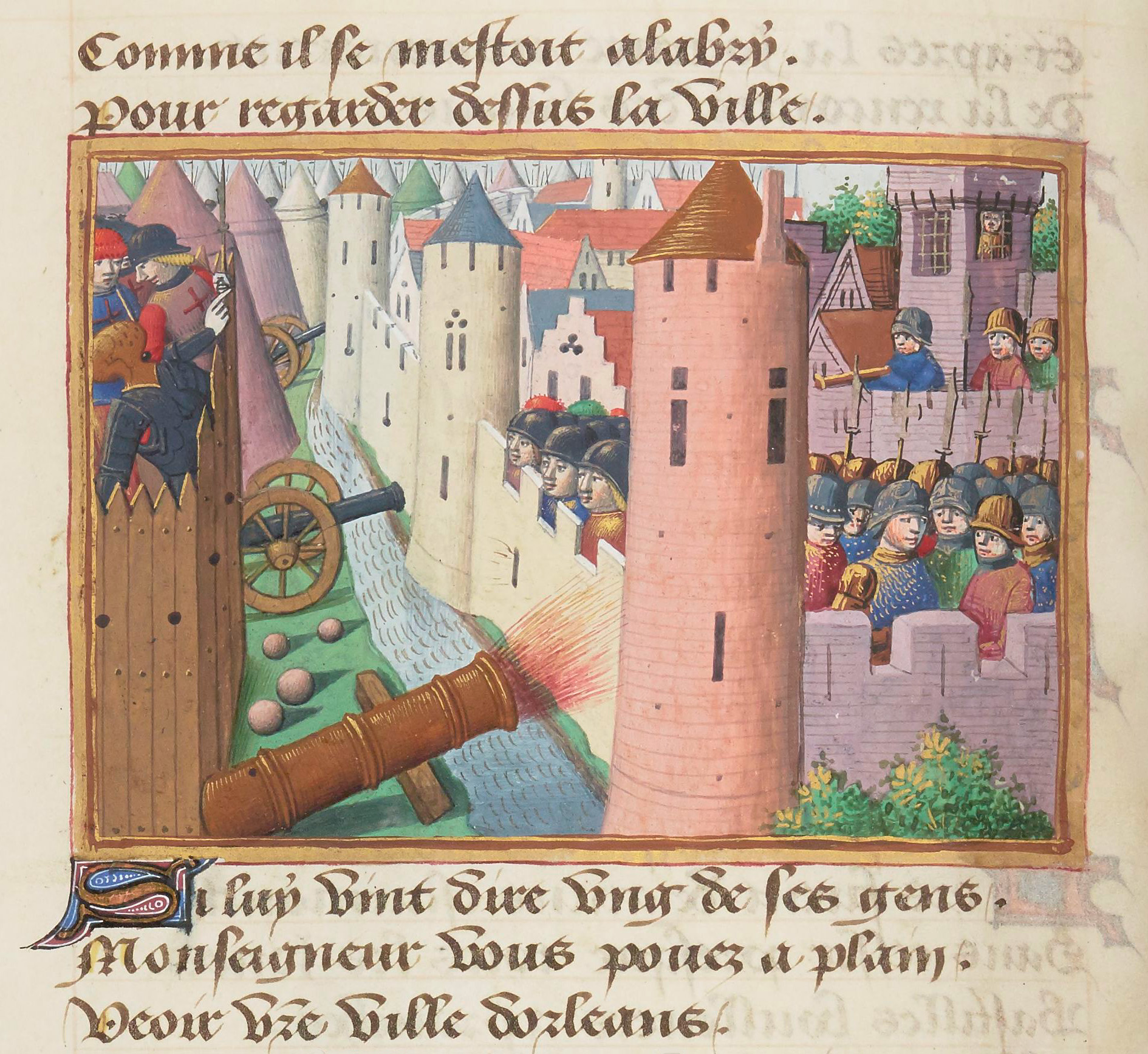
Thomas Montagu, 4th Earl of Salisbury is fatally injured at the siege of Orléans in 1428 (illustration from Vigiles de Charles VII).

On 27 October 1428, he was wounded during the siege of Orléans, when the tower he was inside was hit by a cannonball. There are conflicting reports on the manner in which this wounded him; Enguerrand de Monstrelet states a piece of stone from the window "carried away part of his face". He died days later at Meung-sur-Loire on 3 November 1428.

Political offices
Preceded by –	Governor of Champagne; 1423–1424	Succeeded by –
French nobility
New title	Earl of Perche; 1419–1428	Extinct
Peerage of England
Preceded by John Montagu	Baron Monthermer; 1421–1428	Succeeded by Alice Montagu
Preceded by John Montagu	Earl of Salisbury; 1421–1428	Succeeded by Alice Montagu
