= Mary Fiennes (lady-in-waiting) =

English courtier

- Born: 1495; Herstmonceux Castle, Sussex, England
- Died: 1531 (aged 35–36)
- Noble family: Fiennes; Bourchier
- Spouse: Henry Norris
- Issue: Sir William Norris; Edward Norris; Henry Norris, 1st Baron Norreys; Mary Norris
- Father: Thomas Fiennes, 8th Baron Dacre
- Mother: Anne Bourchier
- Occupation: Maid of Honour

Mary Fiennes (1495–1531) was an English courtier. She was the wife of Henry Norris. Norris was executed for treason as one of the alleged lovers of her cousin, Anne Boleyn, the second wife of King Henry VIII. Mary lived for six years at the French court as a Maid of Honour to queens consort Mary Tudor, wife of Louis XII; and Claude of France, wife of Francis I.

== Family and early years ==
Mary was born at Herstmonceux Castle in Sussex in 1495, the only daughter of Thomas Fiennes, 8th Baron Dacre and Anne Bourchier. By both her father and mother she was descended from Edward III. She had two younger brothers, Sir Thomas and John. Her mother was an elder half-sister of Elizabeth Howard and Lord Edmund Howard, making queen consorts Anne Boleyn and Catherine Howard a cousin of Mary. Her paternal grandmother, Alice FitzHugh, was sister to Elizabeth FitzHugh, grandmother of Catherine Parr, making her cousin to yet another queen consort of Henry VIII.

In 1514, Mary was appointed a Maid of Honour to Princess Mary Tudor and accompanied her to France when the latter married King Louis XII of France. Afterwards she served in the capacity to Queen Mary's successor, Queen Claude, consort of the new king Francis I of France. Among her fellow Maids of Honour were her cousins, Mary (a mistress of Henry VIII) and Anne Boleyn.

== Marriage and children ==
Mary attended the Field of the Cloth of Gold in 1520, where she met the courtier, Henry Norreys or Norris (1491 – 17 May 1536) of Yattendon in Berkshire. They married on their return to England

Norris served King Henry VIII as a Gentleman of the Bedchamber, and was held in high favour by the King. He was later appointed Groom of the Stool and continued to enjoy the King's favour. According to biographer Eric Ives, Norris was "perhaps the nearest thing Henry had to a friend." Norris had control of King Henry's Privy chamber.

Henry and Mary had three children:

- Edward Norris (died 1529)
- Mary Norris (c. 1523-1570), who married firstly Sir George Carew, at which time Catherine Howard gave her a "pair of beads", and secondly Sir Arthur Champernowne, by whom she had issue.
- Henry Norris, 1st Baron Norreys (c. 1525 – 1601), married Margaret Williams of Rycote, by whom he had issue.

== Death ==
Mary died in 1531, a year after her mother. Five years later her husband was attainted and executed for treason as one of the five alleged lovers of her cousin Queen Anne Boleyn, who herself was beheaded at the Tower of London on 19 May 1536.

Their two orphaned children, one having already died in 1529, were raised by Norris's brother Sir John Norris.

== Ancestry ==
Ancestors of Mary Fiennes (lady-in-waiting)

16. Sir Roger Fiennes
8. Richard Fiennes, 7th Baron Dacre
17. Elizabeth Holland
4. Sir John Fiennes
18. Sir Thomas Dacre
9. Joan Dacre, 7th Baroness Dacre
19. Elizabeth Bowet
2. Thomas Fiennes, 8th Baron Dacre
20. William FitzHugh, 4th Baron FitzHugh
10. Henry FitzHugh, 5th Baron FitzHugh
21. Margery Willoughby
5. Alice FitzHugh
22. Richard Neville, 5th Earl of Salisbury
11. Lady Alice Neville
23. Alice Montacute, 5th Countess of Salisbury
1. Mary Fiennes
24. William Bourchier, 1st Count of Eu
12. John Bourchier, 1st Baron Berners
25. Anne of Gloucester
6. Sir Humphrey Bourchier
26. Sir Richard Berners
13. Lady Margery Berners
27.
3. Anne Bourchier
28. Sir Philip Tilney
14. Sir Frederick Tilney
29. Isabel Thorpe
7. Elizabeth Tilney
30. Sir Laurence Cheney
15. Elizabeth Cheney
31. Elizabeth Cockayne
