= Thomas Fiennes, 8th Baron Dacre =

English peer and soldier

The Right Horourable The Lord Dacre KB
- Baron Dacre
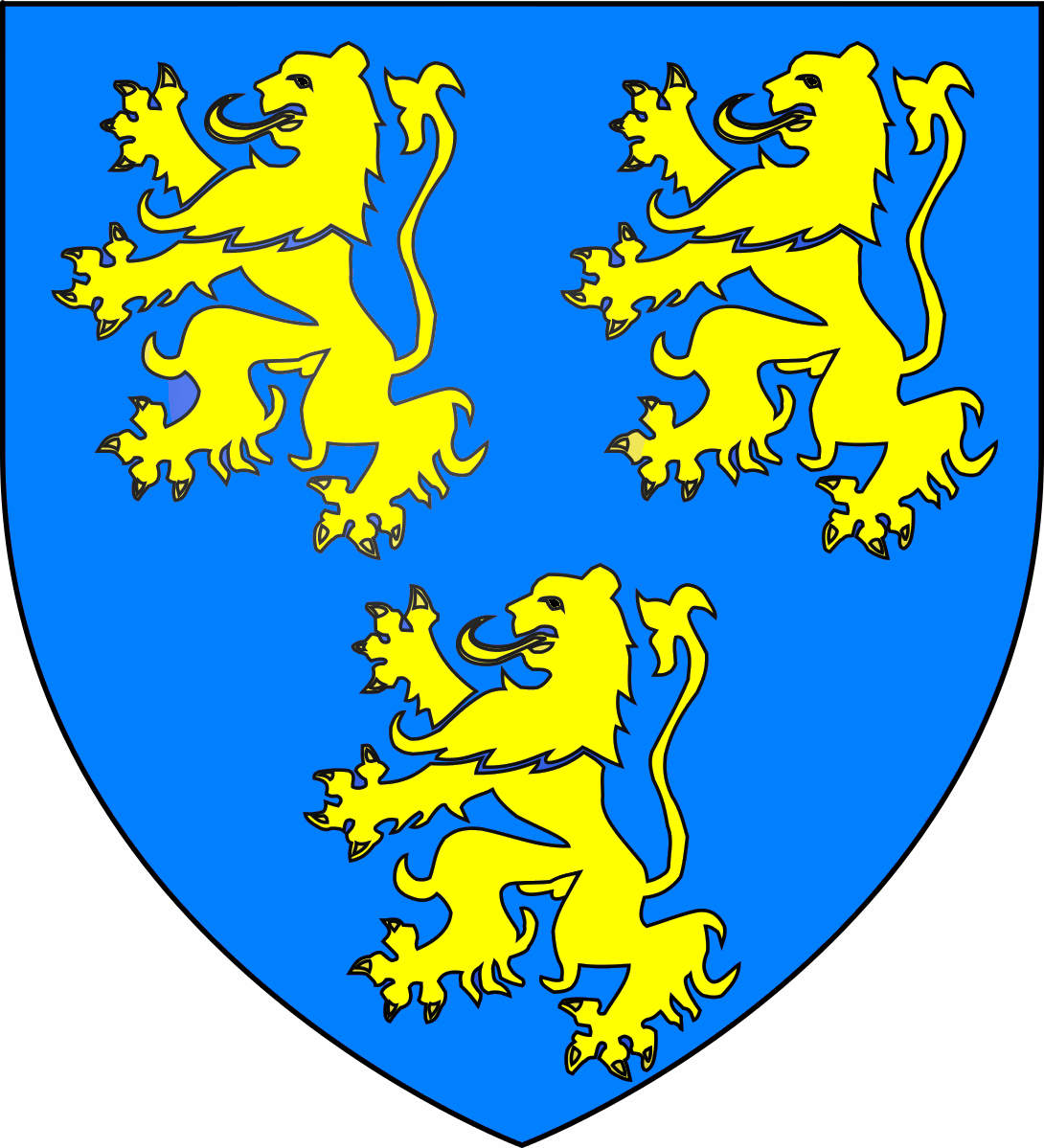
- Coat of arms
- Predecessor: Joan de Dacre, 7th Baroness Dacre
- Successor: Thomas Fiennes, 9th Baron Dacre
- Born: Thomas Fiennes; 1472; Herstmonceux Castle, Sussex, England
- Died: 9 September 1534 (aged 61–62)
- Buried: All Saints Church, Herstmonceux
- Noble family: Fiennes
- Spouse: Anne Bourchier
- Issue: Sir Thomas Fiennes; John Fiennes; Thomas Fiennes; Mary Fiennes
- Father: Sir John Fiennes
- Mother: Alice FitzHugh

Thomas Fiennes, 8th Baron Dacre (1472 – 9 September 1534) was an English peer and soldier, the son of Sir John Fiennes.

== Career ==
He was born in 1472, the son of Sir John Fiennes (born c.1447, son of Richard Fiennes, 7th Baron Dacre born 1415) and Alice FitzHugh. By his mother, he was a cousin to Sir Thomas Parr, father of future queen consort Catherine Parr. He had one sister, Anne, Marchioness Berkeley (died 10 September 1497), who married secondly to Sir Thomas Brandon. On 8 March 1486, he succeeded as 8th Baron Dacre upon the death of his grandmother Joan Dacre, the suo jure 7th Baroness Dacre. He was also known as Baron Dacre of the South owing to his family seat of Herstmonceux Castle being in the county of Sussex.

In 1493, one year after his marriage, he was appointed Constable of Calais. He was invested as a Knight of the Bath in 1494. In 1497, he fought in the Battle of Blackheath where he helped defeat the Cornish.

== Marriage and issue ==
In about 1492, he married Anne Bourchier, the daughter of Sir Humphrey Bourchier and Elizabeth Tilney. The marriage produced three sons and a daughter:

- Sir Thomas Fiennes (died 26 October 1528), married in 1514, Jane Sutton, daughter of Edward Sutton, 2nd Baron Dudley, and Cicely Willoughby, by whom he had one son, Thomas Fiennes, 9th Baron Dacre and a daughter Anne who married John Mantell. The 9th Baron and his brother-in-law Mantell were hanged for the murder of John Busbridge in 1541.
- John Fiennes (b.1497)
- Thomas Fiennes, married c.1537 Margaret More, daughter of Sir Christopher More of Loseley, Surrey.
- Mary Fiennes (1495–1531), married Henry Norris, by whom she had issue.

== Death ==
He died on 9 September 1534 at the age of 62. He was succeeded by his eldest grandson, Thomas Fiennes, as his eldest son had predeceased him.

The tomb set up for the 8th Baron Dacre and his son at All Saints Church, Herstmonceux, known as the Dacre Tomb, is thought to have made use of effigies from an older monument intended for Thomas Hoo, Baron Hoo and Hastings (1396-1455) and his younger half-brother, also Sir Thomas Hoo (born 1416). This was shown when the monument was restored, and it was found that the original arms shown on the tabards of the figures were those of Hoo. It is conjectured that the Hoo tomb may have been at Battle Abbey, which was sold in 1539 and dismantled soon afterwards.

== Gallery ==
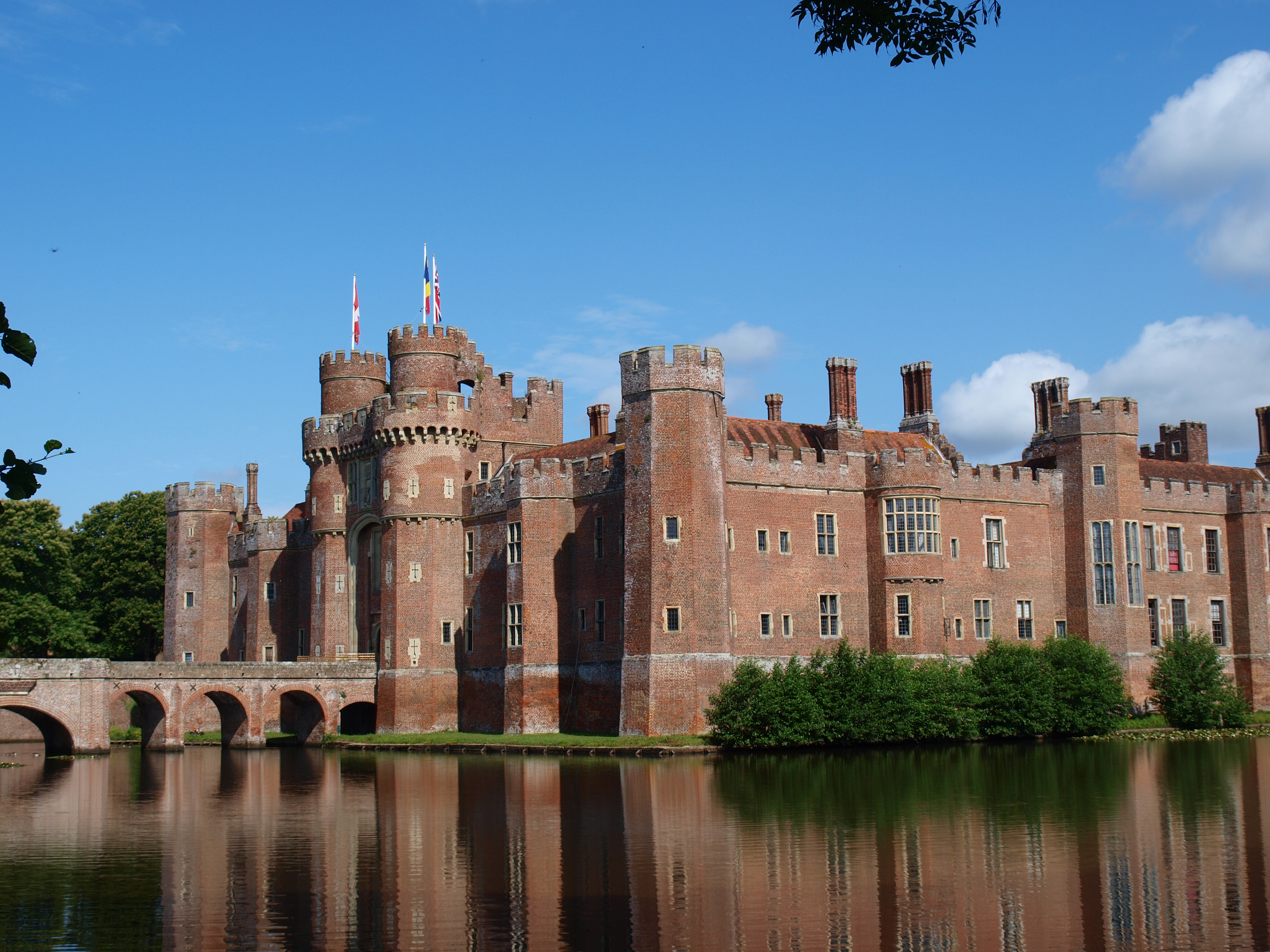
Herstmonceux Castle, seat of the Barons Dacre of the South

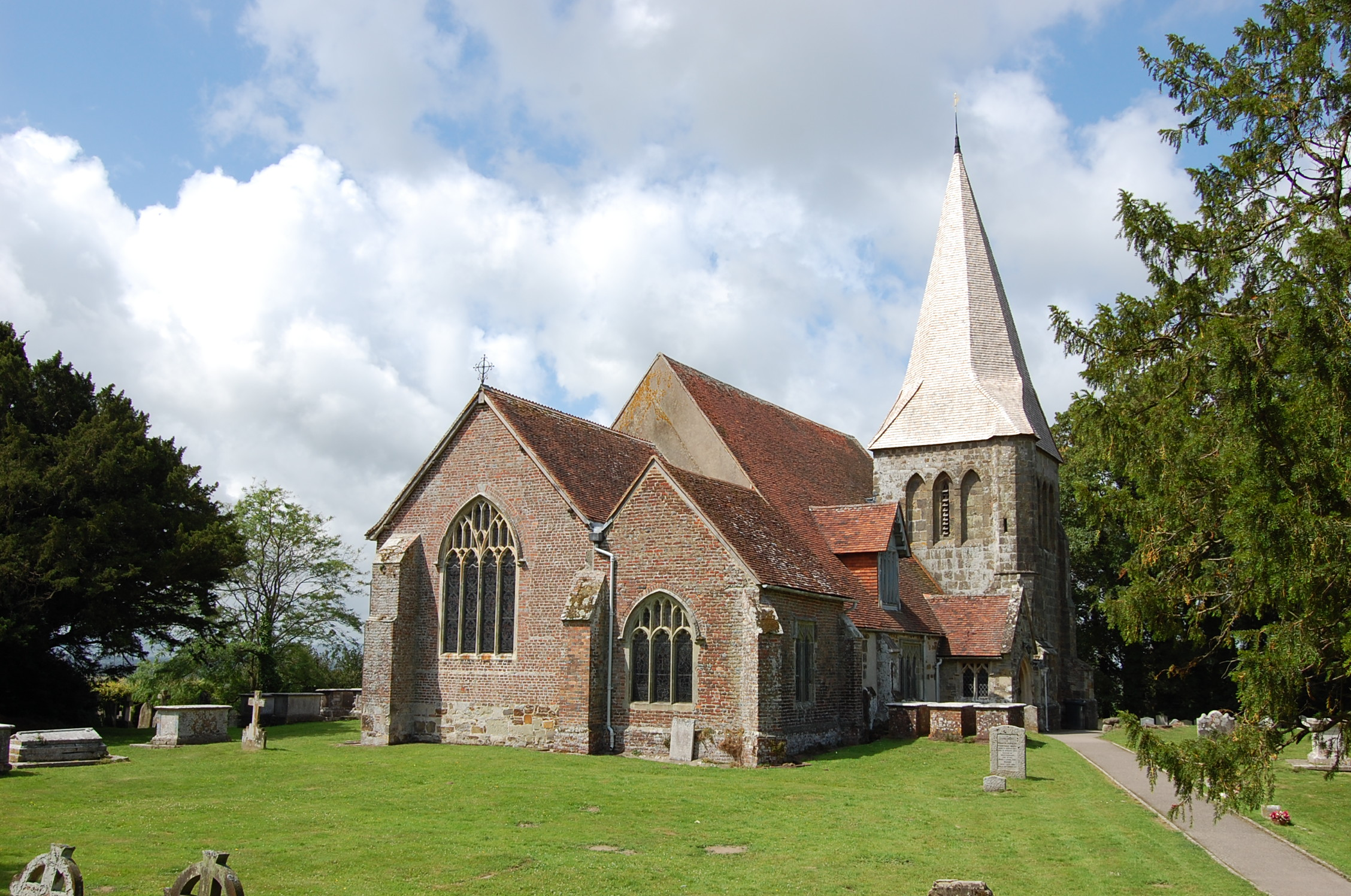
All Saints church, Herstmonceux

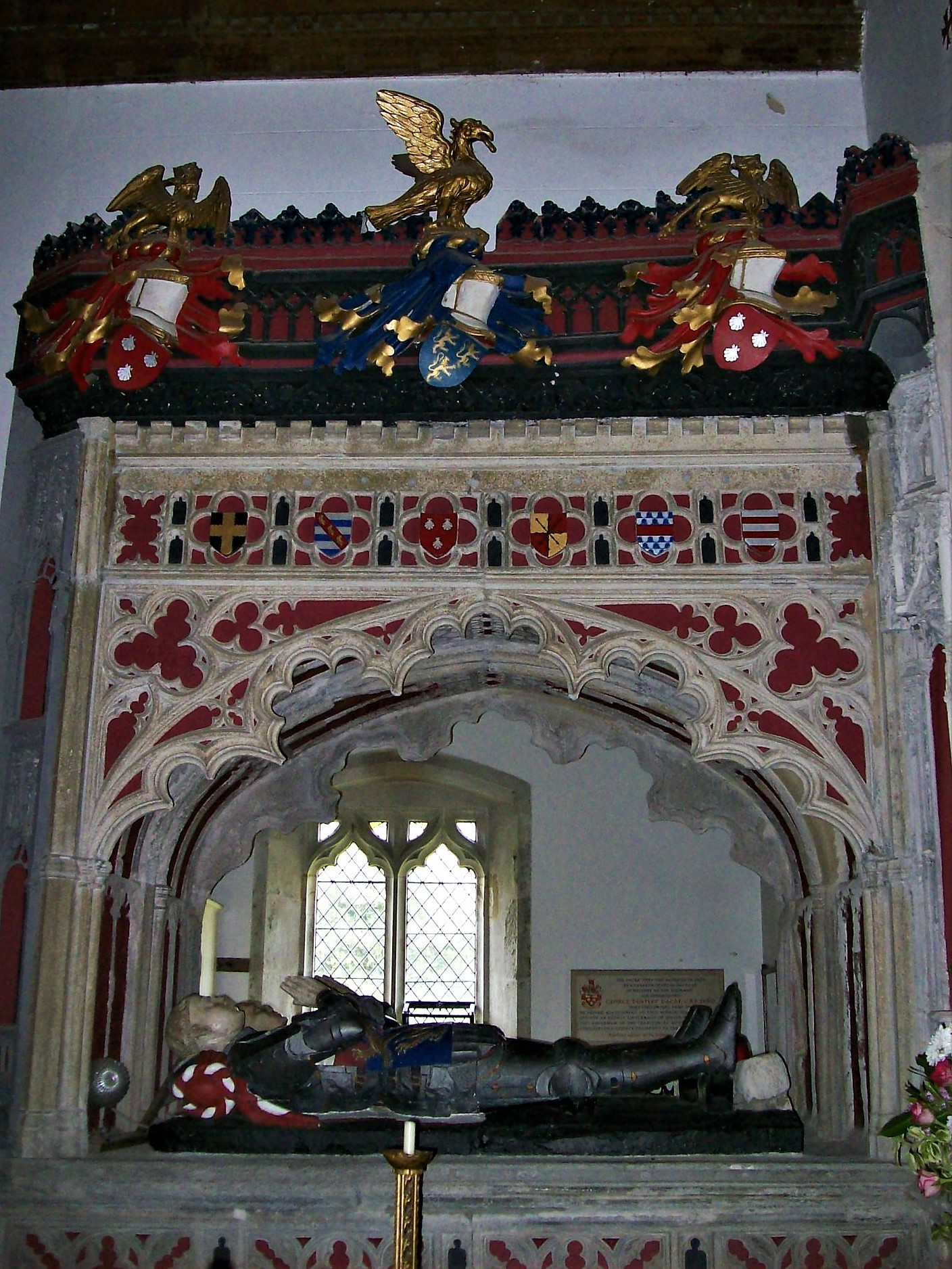
Tomb of Thomas Fiennes, 8th Lord Dacre (1472–1534) and his son, Sir Thomas Fiennes (d. 1528)

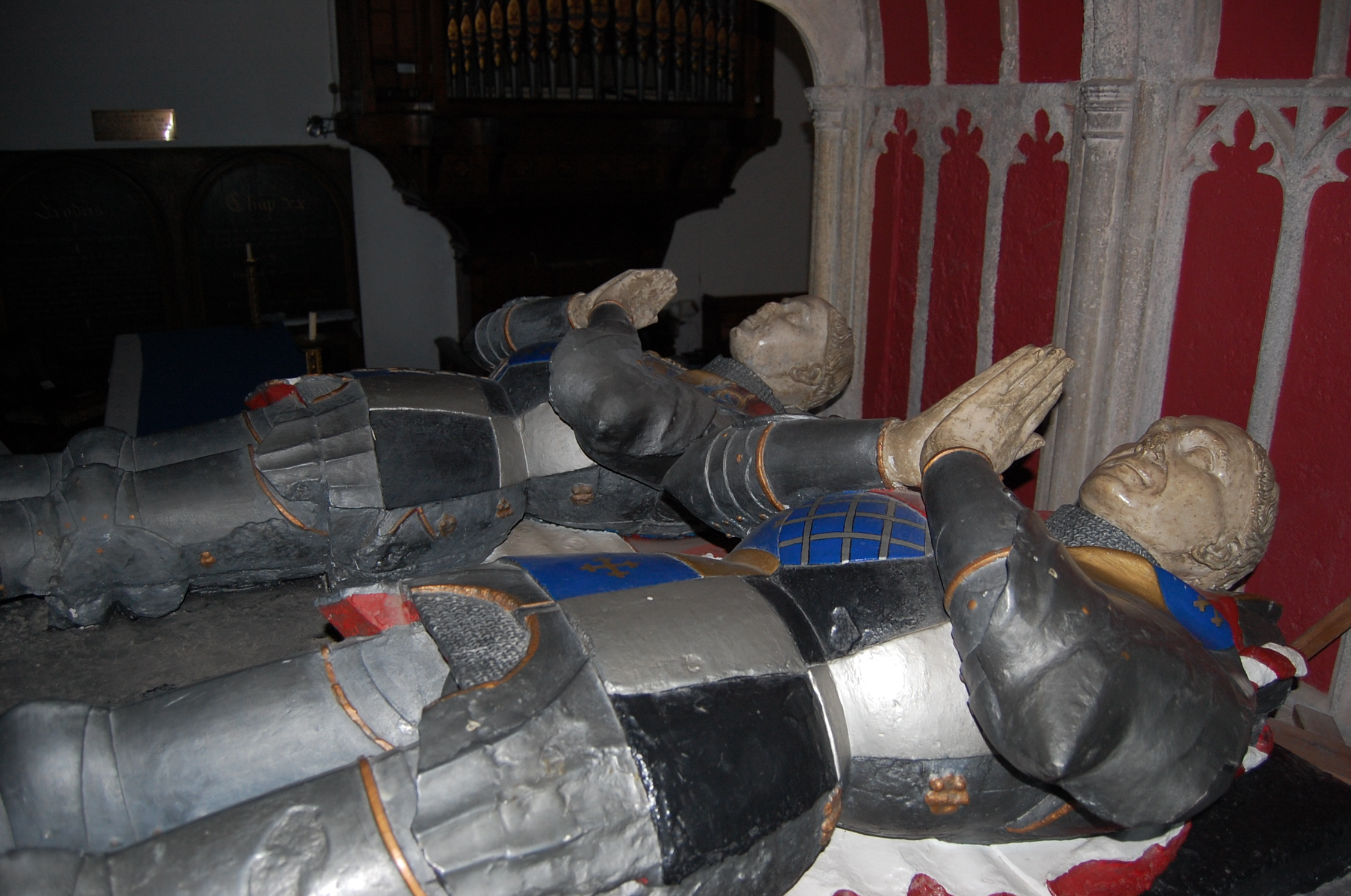
Tomb of Lord Dacre and his son, All Saints, Herstmonceux

== Ancestry ==
Ancestors of Thomas Fiennes, 8th Baron Dacre

16. William de Fiennes
8. Roger Fiennes
17. Elizabeth Battisford
4. Richard Fiennes, 7th Baron Dacre
18. Sir John Holland
9. Elizabeth Holland
19. Margaret
2. Sir John Fiennes
20. Thomas Dacre, 6th Baron Dacre
10. Sir Thomas Dacre
21. Philippa de Neville
5. Joan Dacre, 7th Baroness Dacre
22. Sir William Bowet
11. Elizabeth Bowet
23. Joan Ufford
1. Thomas Fiennes, 8th Baron Dacre
24. Henry FitzHugh, 3rd Baron FitzHugh
12. William FitzHugh, 4th Baron FitzHugh
25. Elizabeth Grey
6. Henry FitzHugh, 5th Baron FitzHugh
26. William Willoughby, 5th Baron Willoughby de Eresby
13. Margery Willoughby
27. Lucy le Strange
3. Alice FitzHugh
28. Ralph Neville, 1st Earl of Westmorland
14. Richard Neville, 5th Earl of Salisbury
29. Lady Joan Beaufort
7. Lady Alice Neville
30. Thomas Montagu, 4th Earl of Salisbury
15. Alice Montacute, 5th Countess of Salisbury
31. Lady Eleanor Holland

== Sources ==
- Benolte, Thomas; Philipot, John; Owen, George; St George, Richard (1905). Bannerman, W. Bruce (ed.). The visitations of the County of Sussex Made and Taken in the Years 1530, Thomas Benolte, Clarenceux king of arms; and 1633-4 by John Philipot, Somerset Herald, and George Owen, York Herald, for Sir John Burroughs, Garter, and Sir Richard St. George, Clarenceux. Publications of the Harleian Society. Vol. 53. London: The Harleian Society. p. 12.
- Bruce, Rosslyn; Tate, Mary H. (1997). All Saints Church, Herstmonceux. Revised and amended by Mary H. Tate. pp. 6–8. OCLC 1311285956.
- Cokayne, George Edward (1916). Gibbs, Vicary; Doubleday, H. Arthur (eds.). The Complete Peerage of England, Scotland, Ireland, Great Britain and the United Kingdom, Extant, Extinct, or Dormant. Vol. 4 (new ed.). London: St Catherine Press. pp. 9-10.
- Collins, Arthur; Brydges, Egerton (1812). Collins's Peerage of England: Genealogical, Biographical, and Historical. Vol. 6. Greatly Augmented and Continued to the Present Time, By Sir Egerton Brydges, K. J. London: Printed for F.C. and J. Rivington, Otridge and Son. OCLC 3986749.
- Mosley, Charles, ed. (2003). Burke's Peerage, Baronetage and Knightage. Vol. 1 (107th ed.). Wilmington: Burke's Peerage & Gentry. p. 1014. ISBN 0971196621.
- Richardson, Douglas (2011). Everingham, Kimball G. (ed.). Plantagenet Ancestry: A Study in Colonial and Medieval Families. Vol. 3 (2nd ed.). CreateSpace. ISBN 978-1461045137.

Peerage of England
Preceded by Joan Dacre	Baron Dacre; 1486–1534	Succeeded by Thomas Fiennes
