= Thomas Dacre, 2nd Baron Dacre =

English nobleman (1467–1525)

- Baron Dacre of Gilsland
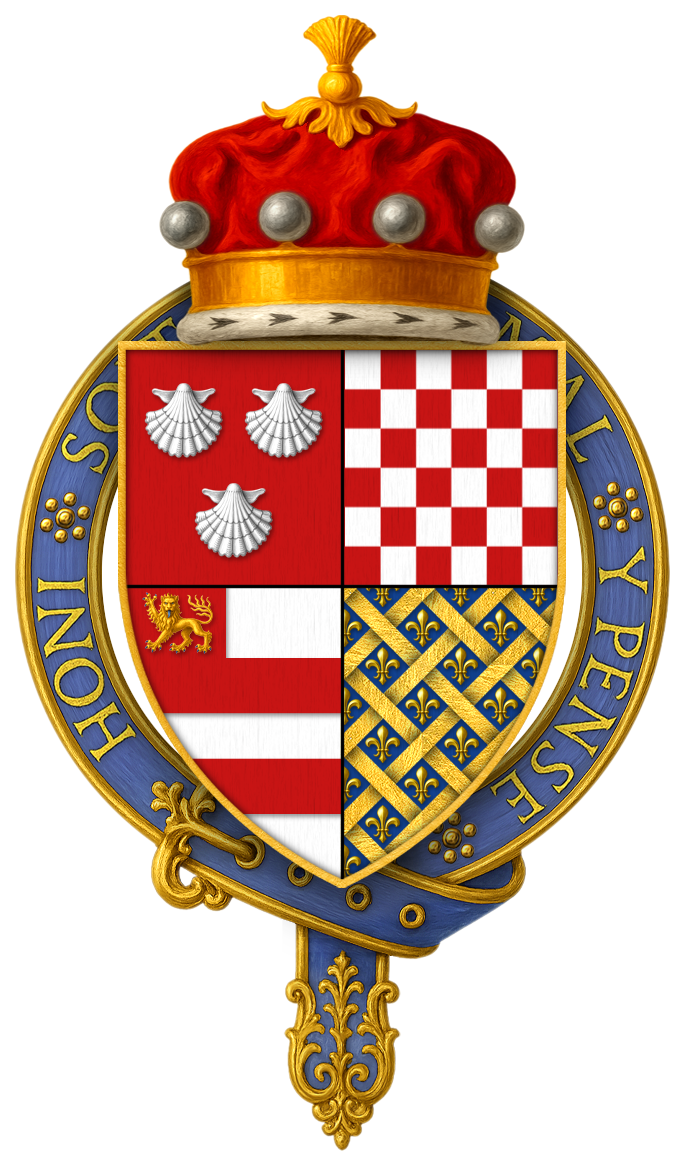
- Arms of Sir Thomas Dacre, 2nd Baron Dacre, KG
- Tenure: 30 May 1485 – 24 October 1525
- Predecessor: Humphrey Dacre, 1st Baron Dacre
- Successor: William Dacre, 3rd Baron Dacre
- Born: 25 November 1467; Gilsland, Cumberland, England.
- Died: 24 October 1525 (aged 57); Borders of Scotland and England.
- Residence: Naworth Castle
- Spouse: Elizabeth de Greystoke, ''suo jure'' 6th Baroness Greystoke
- Issue: Mabel Dacre, Baroness Scrope of Bolton; Elizabeth Dacre, Lady Musgrave; William Dacre, 3rd Baron Dacre; Anne Dacre, Baroness Conyers; Mary Dacre, Countess of Shrewsbury; Hon. Humphrey Dacre; Jane Dacre, Lady Tailboys
- Parents: Humphrey Dacre, 1st Baron Dacre; Mabel Parr

Thomas Dacre, 2nd Baron Dacre of Gilsland (25 November 1467 – 24 October 1525) was the son of Humphrey Dacre, 1st Baron Dacre of Gilsland and Mabel Parr, daughter of Sir Thomas Parr of Kendal by his wife, Alice Tunstall (daughter of Sir Thomas Tunstall, of Thurland Castle and cousin to Bishop Cuthbert Tunstall who served Henry VIII and all of his children). Mabel was the first of the Parr family to marry into the peerage but she was surpassed by her great-niece, Catherine Parr, who became the sixth and final wife of Henry VIII.

== Early career ==
Thomas Dacre was born in Naworth Castle, Cumberland, the eldest of nine children. His father Humphrey died of natural causes on 30 May 1485, whereupon, Thomas succeeded him as Baron Dacre of Gilsland.

The 2nd Lord Dacre took a gamble on a seemingly insignificant marriage precontract with a Greystoke lady who had little apparent value. His luck turned when her father died in 1483, making her the heir-general to her grandfather, Lord Greystoke, who died in 1487. Seeing the opportunity, Dacre abducted and married her. His fortune grew further when her uncle, the male heir, died in 1501, followed by the uncle's only child in 1508. By then, Dacre had secured the entire Greystoke inheritance, more than doubling his income.

Known as "the Builder Dacre", Thomas Dacre built the gateway of Naworth Castle (the seat of the Dacre family), and placed over it his coat of arms with the Dacre family motto below: Fort en Loialte (Norman-French: "Strong in Loyalty").

A formidable soldier by his late teens, Dacre, then aged 17, took part in the Battle of Bosworth (22 August 1485) on the Yorkist side against Henry Tudor, where the Yorkist king, Richard III of England, was defeated and killed. He however quickly made peace with the victor. This early support for the House of Tudor earned him some favour with Henry Tudor (who had now ascended the throne as "King Henry VII of England"), who would continue to trust his services for the remainder of his reign. King Henry VII named him a Knight of the Bath in 1503. Dacre later swore loyalty to King Henry's son and successor, Henry VIII, when he ascended the throne in 1509.

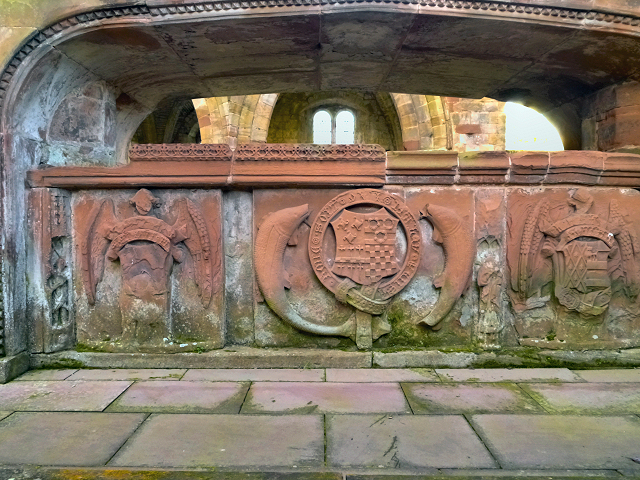
Tomb of Sir Thomas Dacre in Lanercost Priory, Cumbria.

He was named deputy of the Lord Warden of the Marches (an officer on the border with Scotland) in 1485, and then Warden of the Western Marches, and finally Warden-general over all the marches in 1509. James IV of Scotland granted him fishing rights to salmon of the river Esk in April 1498, allowing him to build fish traps called "garths". He was to pay a duty of a number of fish to the keeper of Lochmaben Castle each year. Dacre was considered a friend of James IV, he once claimed that "no Englishman knew more of the secrets of the Scots than him". He was part of the train that took Margaret Tudor to Scotland to be married to James IV, attended James's wedding and played cards with him, once taking £2 6s 8d from the king. He also attended the wedding of Margaret's older brother, Arthur, Prince of Wales to Catherine of Aragon. As a friend of James, Dacre had advised the king not to invade England whilst Henry was in France. James dismissed the warning and, so, prepared to invade England, leading to the Battle of Flodden.

Dacre and his forces served under Thomas Howard, Earl of Surrey at the Battle of Flodden (9 September 1513), where the invading army of James IV was crushingly defeated and its king killed. Dacre commanded the "Border Lancers" at the battle, and their charge had saved the life of the son of the Duke of Norfolk, Lord Edmund Howard, commander of the English right wing. The battle cry of the Dacres is “A red bull! A red bull!” (The red bull was a supporter of the arms of Dacre), the cry filling the Scots at Flodden with dread. King James IV himself had been killed, and the Kingdom of Scotland then ceased its involvement in the War of the League of Cambrai. The victory further helped solidify the reputation of Dacre as a soldier. After the battle, Dacre discovered the body of the Scottish king, informed Thomas Howard, Lord Admiral, and took it to Berwick upon Tweed where it was identified by Scottish courtiers and was then sent down to London in a lead coffin. Dacre later wrote that the Scots, "love me worst of any Inglisheman living, by reason that I fande the body of the King of Scotts."

Margaret Tudor continued to write to Dacre after her husband's death, with Dacre often acting as an intermediary between Margaret and her younger brother, Henry VIII. In 1515, Margaret was banished from Scotland by the regent, John Stewart, Duke of Albany, and wanted to come to England with her second husband Archibald Douglas, 6th Earl of Angus. Around September 1515, Margaret and Dacre discussed her leaving Scotland, and Margaret wrote that Dacre was misinformed, and that she could not pass where ever she wished. Being heavily pregnant at the time, Margaret and her husband left Scotland with Dacre offering her Harbottle Castle in Northumberland, which he owned, as a place for them to stay. It was here in October 1515 that their daughter, also called Margaret, was born.

In August 1516 Dacre wrote to Cardinal Wolsey about his activity in Scotland to subvert the Regent, the Duke of Albany, and to inform him of his raids into Scotland to burn crops and farms. He had sent John Whelpdale, the Master of the College of Greystoke to collect Margaret's rents and her jewels.

Dacre organised repairs at Wark Castle in 1517 obtaining money from Cardinal Wolsey and employing the Master Mason of Berwick to design new fortifications. In June 1518 he wrote that the new donjon or keep was finished, and fit to mount great cannon on each vaulted floor. There were three wards or courtyards, almost complete.

King Henry VIII named him a Knight of the Garter in 1518, alongside William Sandys, 1st Baron Sandys of the Vyne. He was present, with all the other Garter Knights, at the meeting in 1520 between Henry VIII and Francis I of France now known as the Field of the Cloth of Gold.

Dacre was at the burning of Jedburgh in 1523, and with Arthur Darcy and Marmaduke Constable led a force to capture and slight Ferniehirst Castle which belonged to a personal enemy.

Dacre died on the borders on 24 October 1525, killed by a fall from his horse, and was buried in his family's mausoleum at Lanercost Priory. By the time of his death, he held about 70,000 acres (280 km^{2}) of land in Cumberland, 30,000 acres (120 km^{2}) in Yorkshire, and 20,000 acres (80 km^{2}) in Northumberland. Much of these lands had been inherited through marriages with the heiresses of the Greystoke, de Multon, and de Vaux families, as well as grants given by both Kings, Henry VII and Henry VIII.

== Marriage ==
Circa 1488, Dacre eloped with Elizabeth Greystoke, 6th Baroness Greystoke suo jure (10 July 1471 – 14 August 1516), daughter of Sir Robert de Greystoke and Lady Elizabeth Grey, daughter of Edmund Grey, 1st Earl of Kent and Katherine Percy, Countess of Kent. Dacre took her at night from Brougham Castle in Westmorland where, as a ward of the King, she was in the custody of Henry Clifford, 10th Baron de Clifford.

Elizabeth was the eldest granddaughter and heiress to the baronies of Greystoke and Fitzwilliam via her grandfather Ralph de Greystoke, 5th Baron Greystoke. She had only recently succeeded her grandfather in the barony, when by their marriage, Dacre became the jure uxoris Baron Greystoke. The extensive lands held by the Greystokes passed to the Dacre family through this marriage. These included Greystoke Castle and the barony of Greystoke, Morpeth Castle and the barony of Morpeth, along with the lost manor of Henderskelf, which is now the site of Castle Howard.

Thomas and Elizabeth's children:

- Mabel Dacre (c. 1490–1533), married Henry Scrope, 7th Baron Scrope of Bolton. They were parents of John Scrope, 8th Baron Scrope of Bolton and grandparents of Henry Scrope, 9th Baron Scrope of Bolton. The 9th Baron is better known because he was governor of Carlisle in the time of Queen Elizabeth I, and as such, took charge of Mary, Queen of Scots, when she crossed the border in 1568. He took her to Bolton Castle, where she remained there till January 1569.
- Elizabeth Dacre (1495–1538), married Sir Thomas Musgrave, Marshall of Berwick. Their son was William Musgrave, MP.
- William Dacre, 3rd Baron Dacre (29 April 1500 – 18 November 1563), married Lady Elizabeth Talbot, a daughter of George Talbot, 4th Earl of Shrewsbury and Anne Hastings, by whom he had issue.
- Anne Dacre (c. 1501 – 21 April 1548), married Christopher Conyers, 2nd Baron Conyers. They were the parents of John Conyers, 3rd Baron Conyers.
- Mary Dacre (c.1502 – 29 March 1538), married her sister-in-law's brother, Francis Talbot, 5th Earl of Shrewsbury. They were the parents of George Talbot, 6th Earl of Shrewsbury.
- Hon. Humphrey Dacre, married Isabel Martindale, daughter and co-heiress of James Martindale of Newton, Allerdale, Cumberland.
- Jane Dacre, wife of Lord Tailboys.

== Legacy ==
His illegitimate son, Thomas Dacre, successfully led a few hundred English bordermen against part of the invading force of James V of Scotland on 12 November 1542. His success paved the way for the Scottish defeat at Battle of Solway Moss (24 November 1542) after which the Scottish king, James V, died. This was the final defeat of the invading Scottish forces. Afterwards, this Thomas was rewarded with land grants and from his son Christopher Dacre starts a secondary line of "Dacres of Lanercost".

Letters between him and Maud Green, Lady Parr for the marriage of his grandson, Henry le Scrope (son of Henry Scrope, 7th Baron Scrope of Bolton), to her daughter, Katherine Parr survive. The marriage never happened, but Katherine would go on to become Queen Consort to Henry VIII.

== Ancestry ==
Ancestors of Thomas Dacre, 2nd Baron Dacre

16. Hugh Dacre, 4th Baron Dacre
8. William Dacre, 5th Baron Dacre
17. Elizabeth Maxwell
4. Thomas Dacre, 6th Baron Dacre
18. Sir William Douglas, 1st Earl of Douglas & Mar
9. Joan de Douglas [illegitimate]
2. Humphrey Dacre, 1st Baron Dacre
20. John Neville, 3rd Baron Neville de Raby
10. Ralph de Neville, 1st Earl of Westmorland
21. Lady Maud Percy
5. Lady Philippa Neville
22. Hugh de Stafford, 2nd Earl of Stafford
11. Lady Margaret Stafford
23. Lady Philippa de Beauchamp
1. Thomas Dacre, 2nd Baron Dacre
24. Sir William Parr
12. Sir John Parr
25. Elizabeth Ros
6. Sir Thomas of Kendal Parr
26. Sir Thomas de Crophull
13. Agnes Crophull
27. Sybil de la Bere
3. Mabel Parr
28. William de Tunstall
14. Sir Thomas of Thurland Tunstall
29. Agnes de Lindsay
7. Alice Tunstall
30. Sir Nicholas of Farleton Harrington
15. Isabel Harrington
31. Isabel English

== See also ==
- Naworth Castle, ancestral home of the Dacre family

Peerage of England
Preceded by Humphrey Dacre	Baron Dacre; 1485–1525	Succeeded by William Dacre
