= George Fitzhugh (priest) =

Hon. George FitzHugh (died 20 November 1505) was Chancellor of Cambridge University and Dean of Lincoln.

He was the fourth son of Henry FitzHugh, 5th Baron FitzHugh of Ravensworth and his wife Lady Alice Neville. His mother was sister to Richard Neville, 16th Earl of Warwick, known to history as Warwick, the Kingmaker. As a grandnephew of Cecily Neville, Duchess of York, FitzHugh was a first cousin, once removed of the Yorkist kings Edward IV and Richard III. His siblings included Sir Richard, 6th Baron FitzHugh; Lady Elizabeth Parr; and Lady Alice Fiennes.

FitzHugh obtained a licence from the Pope to hold a deanery at sixteen. By the age of twenty-three, he became an ordained priest.

He received a B.A. from Cambridge University in 1478 or 1479 and an M.A. in 1479.

He was Master of Pembroke College, Cambridge from 1488 to 1505 and Chancellor of Cambridge University from 1496 to 1499 and again in 1502. He held a number of ecclesiastical titles, including Prebendary of York, Prebendary of Lincoln, rector of Bingham, Nottinghamshire; rector of Kirkby Ravensworth and of Bedale, and was Dean of Lincoln from 1483 to 1505.

He is buried in Lincoln Cathedral.

Academic offices
| Preceded by Thomas Rotherham | Master of Pembroke College, Cambridge; 1488-1505 | Succeeded by Roger Leyburn |
