= Alice FitzHugh =

English noblewoman

Lady Alice Fiennes (née Alice FitzHugh) (c. 1448 – 10 July 1516) was the eldest daughter and co-heiress of Henry FitzHugh, 5th Baron FitzHugh, and Alice Neville. Alice was born at the ancestral castle of Ravensworth. She married Sir John Fiennes, the son of Sir Richard Fiennes and Joan Dacre, 7th Baroness Dacre. Alice was a first cousin of Queen consort Anne Neville and a great-aunt of Queen consort Catherine Parr.

== Family ==
One of ten children, her siblings include Anne, wife of Francis Lovell, 1st Viscount Lovell; Margery, who married Sir Marmaduke Constable; Joan, a nun; Elizabeth Fitzhugh (grandmother to Queen Catherine Parr), who married Sir William Parr and then Sir Nicholas Vaux; and Richard, 6th Baron FitzHugh who married Hon. Elizabeth Burgh, daughter of Thomas Burgh, 1st Baron Burgh; their son, George, inherited the barony of FitzHugh, but after his death in 1513 the barony fell into abeyance between Alice and her nephew Sir Thomas Parr. This abeyance continues to the present day.

Her maternal grandparents were Richard Neville, 5th Earl of Salisbury and Lady Alice Montague, 5th Countess of Salisbury, suo jure, only daughter and heiress of Thomas Montacute, 4th Earl of Salisbury and Lady Eleanor Holland. Her paternal grandparents were William FitzHugh, 4th Baron FitzHugh and Margery Willoughby. Through her grandfather, the Earl of Salisbury, she was a niece of Richard Neville, 16th Earl of Warwick (known in history as "Warwick, the Kingmaker"), a grandniece of Cecily Neville, Duchess of York (mother of King Edward IV and King Richard III) and a great-grandniece of King Henry IV.

Through her great-grandmother, Eleanor Holland, she was a great-great-grandniece of King Richard II and was also related to the York line of Kings and their successor Henry Tudor, who became King Henry VII.

== Marriage and issue ==
At about the age of seventeen, Alice was married to Sir John Fiennes on 19 November 1466 at her home in Ravensworth, Yorkshire, England. After her marriage she lived at Herstmonceux Castle in East Sussex, about 300 miles (500 km) away from her family and home.

Alice had five sons and one daughter:

- Anne Fiennes, Marchioness of Berkeley (about 1468 – 10 September 1497), married William de Berkeley, 1st Marquess of Berkeley, and secondly married Sir Thomas Brandon (1470 – 27 January 1509), uncle of Charles Brandon, 1st Duke of Suffolk.
- Thomas Fiennes, 8th Baron Dacre, married Anne Bourchier, the uterine sister of Elizabeth Howard (the wife of Thomas Boleyn), Lord Edmund Howard and Thomas Howard, 3rd Duke of Norfolk, and thus "half-aunt" of Queen Anne Boleyn and Queen Catherine Howard.
- Richard Fiennes (born about 1476).
- Edward Fiennes (born about 1478).
- Roger Fiennes (born about 1480).
- William Fiennes (born about 1483).

== Ancestry ==
Ancestors of Alice FitzHugh

16. Hugh FitzHugh, 2nd Baron FitzHugh
8. Henry FitzHugh, 3rd Baron FitzHugh
17. Joan Scrope
4. William FitzHugh, 4th Baron FitzHugh
18. Sir Robert Grey
9. Elizabeth Grey
19. Lora St. Quintin
2. Henry FitzHugh, 5th Baron FitzHugh
20. Robert Willoughby, 4th Baron Willoughby de Eresby
10. William Willoughby, 5th Baron Willoughby de Eresby
21. Alice Skipwith
5. Marjory Willoughby
22. Roger le Strange, 5th Baron Strange
11. Lucy Le Strange
23. Alaive Fitzalan
1. Alice FitzHugh
24. John Neville, 3rd Baron Neville de Raby
12. Ralph de Neville, 1st Earl of Westmorland
25. Maud Percy
6. Richard Neville, 5th Earl of Salisbury
26. John of Gaunt, 1st Duke of Lancaster
13. Lady Joan Beaufort
27. Katherine Swynford, Duchess of Lancaster
3. Lady Alice Neville
28. John Montacute, 3rd Earl of Salisbury
14. Thomas Montacute, 4th Earl of Salisbury
29. Maud Francis, Countess of Salisbury
7. Lady Alice Montacute, 5th Countess of Salisbury
30. Thomas Holland, 2nd Earl of Kent
15. Lady Eleanor Holland
31. Lady Alice Fitzalan
