= Thomas Fiennes =

Thomas Fiennes may refer to:

- Thomas Fiennes, 8th Baron Dacre (1472–1534), English peer and soldier
- Thomas Fiennes, 9th Baron Dacre (ca. 1515–1541), English aristocrat notable for his conviction and execution for murder
