= Mary Fiennes =

Mary Fiennes may refer to:

- Mary Fiennes, Baroness Dacre (1524–1576), wife of Thomas Fiennes, 9th Baron Dacre
- Mary Fiennes (lady-in-waiting) (1495–1531), wife of Henry Norris, executed with Mary's cousin, Anne Boleyn
