= William Kinwolmarsh =

William Kinwolmarsh (d. December 1422) was a royal treasurer of England for about seven days, during 1422.

== Biography ==
Kinwolmarsh was appointed as Provost of Beverley Minster during 1419, followed by the position of Deputy Treasurer of England (1417–1421), and the royal household's Lord High Treasurer, a position that he held for only one week before his death.

He had been appointed by the widowed Lucia, Countess of Kent as a deputy to regulate her dower. He was given a role in the visit to France of Queen Catherine of Valois. In the reign of Henry IV, Kinwolmarsh was Dean of St-Martin's le-Grand. He is noted as particularly active in fulfilling his duties as a royal councillor and administrator.

== See also ==
- John Stafford (bishop)
- Henry FitzHugh

Political offices
Preceded by Baron FitzHugh	Lord High Treasurer; 1422–1422	Succeeded by John Stafford
