= Roger Leyburn =

16th-century Bishop of Carlisle

Roger Leyburn (died 1508) was an English churchman and academic, Master of Pembroke Hall, Cambridge, archdeacon of Durham and bishop of Carlisle.

== Life ==
Leyburn was born near Carlisle, and was a graduate of the University of Cambridge, proceeding B.A. in 1484 and M.A. in 1486; and later B.D. He became a Fellow of Pembroke Hall, and a proctor in 1489.

Leyburn was archdeacon of Durham in 1490, then rector of Huish Champflower in Somerset (1493), of Long Newton in County Durham (1497), of Wolsingham in Durham (1497), and of Sedgefield in Durham (1499). He became bishop of Carlisle in 1504.; and Master of Pembroke in 1505. In 1504 he with Richard Foxe received a papal commission to draw up new statutes for Balliol College, Oxford; Foxe seems to have had sole responsibility for the outcome, however. He also held the secular post of Chancellor of Durham.

Catholic Church titles
Preceded by William Senhouse	Bishop of Carlisle; 1503–1508	Succeeded by John Penny
Academic offices
Preceded by George Fitzhugh	Master of Pembroke College, Cambridge; 1505-1507	Succeeded by Richard Foxe
