= Anne Bourchier, Baroness Dacre =

English noblewoman

The Right Honourable The Lady Dacre
- Born: Anne Bourchier; 1470; England
- Died: 29 September 1530 (aged 60); Herstmonceux Castle, Sussex
- Noble family: Bourchier
- Spouse: Thomas Fiennes, 8th Baron Dacre
- Issue: Sir Thomas Fiennes; Mary Fiennes; John Fiennes
- Father: Sir Humphrey Bourchier
- Mother: Elizabeth Tilney
- Occupation: Lady of the Bedchamber

Anne Bourchier, Baroness Dacre (1470 – 29 September 1530) was an English noblewoman, the wife of Sir Thomas Fiennes, 8th Baron Dacre. Her stepfather was Thomas Howard, Earl of Surrey, which made Queen consort Anne Boleyn, the second wife of King Henry VIII of England, her niece. Her son-in-law was Henry Norris, who was executed for treason in 1536, as one of the alleged lovers of her niece, Queen Anne.

Anne Dacre was commemorated as one of the ladies in John Skelton's poem, Garlande of Laurrell, when the Poet Laureate was a guest in the Howard residence of Sheriff Hutton Castle.

Anne was also styled as Lady Dacre of the South.

She was a Lady of the Bedchamber to Queen Catherine of Aragon.

== Family ==
Anne was born in 1470, the youngest daughter of Sir Humphrey Bourchier and Elizabeth Tilney. Anne’s paternal grandparents were Sir John Bourchier, 1st Baron Berners and Lady Margery Berners. Sir John Bourchier was knighted and the title of Baron Berners was created, which passed directly to Anne’s brother John Bourchier, 2nd Baron Berners due to her father’s death. Anne’s maternal grandparents were Sir Frederick Tilney and Elizabeth Cheney, Lady Say. Elizabeth Cheney was the great-grandmother of Anne Boleyn, Jane Seymour, and Catherine Howard and married twice, first Sir Frederick Tilney and after his death Sir John Say.

She had a brother, John Bourchier, 2nd Baron Berners, 2nd Baron Berners, and one sister, Margaret Bourchier. On 14 April 1471, when she was a baby, her father, who was heir to the title of Baron Berners, was killed at the Battle of Barnet while fighting for the Yorkists. Her mother married Thomas Howard, the following year. He was the son and heir of John Howard, 1st Duke of Norfolk, and was created Earl of Surrey in 1483. Anne had nine half-siblings from her mother's second marriage, including Elizabeth Howard, which made Anne a half-aunt of Queen Anne Boleyn. Through her half-brother, Lord Edmund Howard, she was also half-aunt to Queen consort Catherine Howard.

Anne's elder sister, Margaret would later serve as Lady Governess to the children of King Henry VIII of England. In August 1485, her stepfather was wounded in the Battle of Bosworth; the same battle where the family's friend and patron King Richard III was slain. The Earl of Surrey was taken prisoner, and upon his release, the Howards would become loyal servants of the new king Henry Tudor.

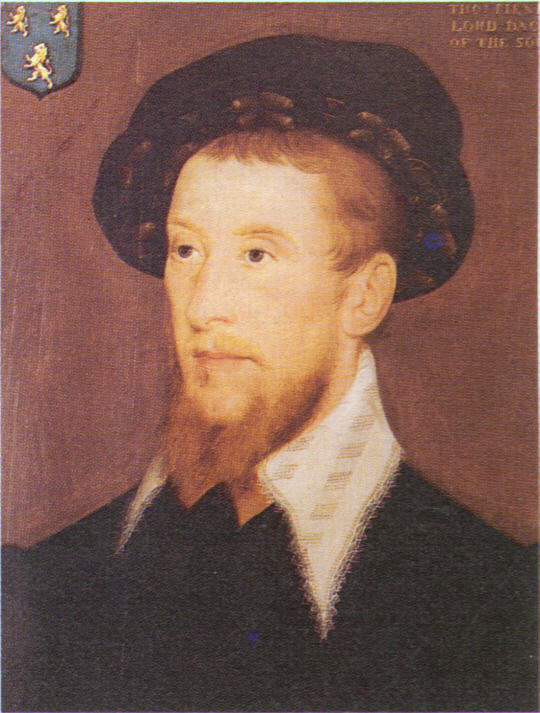
Thomas Fiennes, 9th Baron Dacre, Anne Bourchier's grandson who was executed for murder

== Marriage and issue ==
In about 1492, she married Sir Thomas Fiennes, 8th Baron Dacre (1472–1534), son of Sir John Fiennes and Alice FitzHugh. She was styled as Baroness Dacre upon her marriage. She was also known as Lady Dacre of the South. Sir Thomas and Anne made their principal home at the Fiennes family seat, Herstmonceux Castle in Sussex, and together they had three children:

- Sir Thomas Fiennes (died 26 October 1528), married in 1514, Jane Sutton, daughter of Edward Sutton, 2nd Lord Dudley, and Cicely Willoughby, by whom he had one son and heir Thomas Fiennes, 9th Baron Dacre, who was executed for murder in 1541.
- Mary Fiennes (1495–1531), Maid of Honour to Mary Tudor, Queen of France, and Queen Claude of France married Henry Norris, who was executed for treason as one of the alleged lovers of Queen Anne Boleyn. The marriage produced issue.
- John Fiennes (b.1497)

Anne was a member of the household of Queen Catherine of Aragon as one of her Ladies of the Bedchamber.

== John Skelton ==
Sometime after her marriage, John Skelton, Poet Laureate of England commemorated Anne, her mother, and her two half-sisters, Elizabeth and Muriel in his poem Garlande of Laurrell, which is about an event that had occurred when he was a guest in the Howard residence of Sheriff Hutton Castle. Anne's mother, along with her three daughters and gentlewomen of her household, had placed a garland of laurel, worked in silks, gold, and pearls, upon Skelton's head as a sign of homage to the poet. The stanza which is addressed to Anne reads: "To my Lady Anne Dakers of the sowth". Her name also appears in several of Skelton's other poems.

Anne died on 29 September 1530 at the age of 60.

== Ancestry ==
Ancestors of Anne Bourchier, Baroness Dacre

16. Sir William Bourchier
8. William Bourchier, 1st Count of Eu
17. Eleanor Lovain
4. Sir John Bourchier, 1st Baron Berners
18. Thomas of Woodstock, 1st Duke of Gloucester
9. Anne of Woodstock, Countess of Buckingham
19. Eleanor de Bohun
2. Sir Humphrey Bourchier
20. James Berners
10. Sir Richard Berners
21. Alice
5. Marjorie Berners
22. Walter Dalyngridge
11. Philippe Dalyngridge
23. Margaret Chamond
1. Anne Bourchier, Baroness Dacre
24. Sir Frederick Tilney
12. Sir Philip Tilney
25. Margaret Rochford
6. Sir Fredrick Tilney
26. Sir Edmund Thorpe
13. Isabel Thorpe
27. Joan Northwood
3. Elizabeth Tilney
28. Sir William Cheney
14. Sir Lawrence Cheney
29. Catherine Pabenham
7. Elizabeth Cheney
30. Sir John Cockayne
15. Elizabeth Cokayn
31. Ida de Grey
