= Thomas Dacre, 6th Baron Dacre =

English nobleman (1387–1458)

Thomas Dacre Baron Dacre
- Arms of Dacre: Gules, three escallops argent
- Born: 27 October 1387; Naworth Castle, Cumberland
- Died: 5 January 1458 (aged 70)
- Resting place: Lanercost Priory, Cumberland; 54.9662°N 2.6949°W
- Spouse: Philippa Neville
- Children: Thomas, knight; Randolf, Lord Dacre; Humphrey, Lord Dacre
- Parents: William Dacre, 5th Baron Dacre of Gilsland (father); Joan Douglas (mother)

Thomas Dacre, 6th Baron Dacre of Gilsland (27 October 1387 – 5 January 1458) was a medieval English nobleman.

== Biography ==
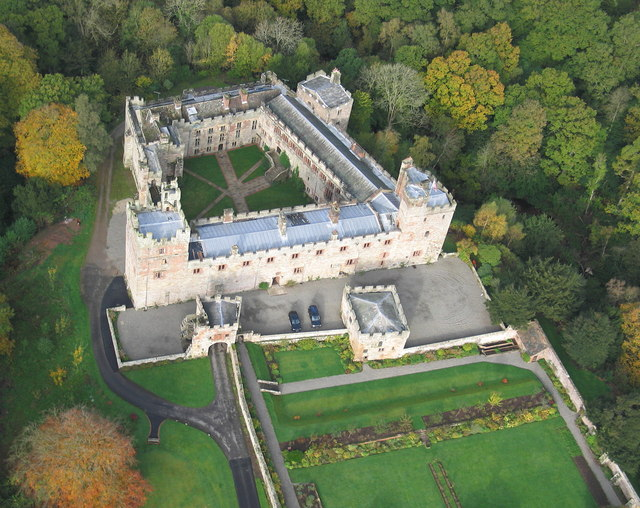
Naworth Castle, seat of the Dacre family

Thomas was the son and heir of William Dacre, 5th Baron Dacre of Gilsland (c. 1357–1399), and Joan Douglas, the illegitimate daughter of William Douglas, 1st Earl of Douglas. He was born at Naworth Castle, Cumberland, on 27 October 1387, and baptized the following day in Brampton church. Thomas received livery of his father's lands at age 21 on 10 November 1408, and was summoned to parliament from 1 December 1412 as 'Thomas Dacre of Gillesland' (Gisland). He held the office Chief Forrester of Inglewood Forest.

Before his father died on 20 July 1399, Dacre married Philippa Neville, daughter of Ralph Neville, 1st Earl of Westmorland, and Margaret Stafford. Dacre became his father-in-law's ward after his father's death, as he was still under age. He died on 5 January 1458 and was buried at Lanercost Priory. His wife was still living on 8 July 1453, but predeceased her husband.

== Issue ==
Thomas and Philippa had seven sons and two daughters. The eldest son, Thomas, knight, married Elizabeth Bowet, daughter and co-heiress of Sir William Bowet, and had two daughters. He was living in 1453 but predeceased his father. The second son, Randolf, was childless, slain at the Battle of Towton in 1461. Humphrey, the third son, married Mabel Parr, daughter of Sir Thomas Parr of Kendal and by her had issue. The other sons – Ralph, Richard, George, and John – are thought to have died young. The eldest daughter, Joan, married Thomas, Lord Clifford, with issue. The younger, Margaret, married John Scrope (son of John 4th Lord Scrope of Masham), without issue.

After Thomas's death in 1458, his granddaughter Joan (daughter of his eldest son) and her husband Richard Fiennes were recognized as heirs to the barony of Dacre. His second and third sons, Randolf and Humphrey, on the other hand, were each summoned to parliament as lords Dacre, in 1459 and 1482 respectively. His heirs general became known as barons Dacre "of the South", and his heirs male were called barons Dacre "of the North".

== Citations ==
Peerage of England
Preceded by William Dacre	Baron Dacre; 1399–1458	Succeeded by Joan Dacre
