= Humphrey Dacre, 1st Baron Dacre =

English soldier and landowner (c. 1424–1485)

Humphrey Dacre, 1st Baron Dacre of Gilsland (c. 1424 – 30 May 1485), was an English soldier, Cumberland landowner and peer.

He remained loyal to the House of Lancaster when Henry VI was deposed by Edward IV and fought on the Lancastrian side at the Battle of Towton of 1461, after which he was attainted. He was later pardoned, regained the family estates, was summoned to parliament as a baron, attended the coronation of Richard III, and was appointed Governor of Carlisle and Warden of the West Marches.

== Life ==
Dacre was the third son of Thomas Dacre, 6th Baron Dacre (1387–1457/1458), by his wife Lady Philippa Neville (1386–1453), the daughter of Ralph Neville, 1st Earl of Westmorland. He was born at Naworth Castle, Cumberland, about 1424, one of at least nine children born to his parents between 1410 and 1426.

He married Mabel Parr (d. 1508), a daughter of Sir Thomas Parr of Kendal, by his marriage to Alice Tunstall, a daughter of Sir Thomas Tunstall, of Thurland Castle. His wife was the great-aunt to King Henry VIII's sixth consort, Catherine Parr, who coincidentally was the only other female in the Parr family to marry into the peerage when she married her second husband, Lord Latimer. With her, Dacre had six sons and three daughters:

- Sir Thomas Dacre (1467–1525), Knight of the Garter, later 2nd Baron Dacre,
- Hugh, a priest,
- Christopher,
- Philip,
- Ralph,
- Humphrey,
- Anne, who married Thomas Strangeways,
- Elizabeth, who married Richard Huddleston,
- Katherine, who married firstly George FitzHugh, 7th Baron FitzHugh (c.1487–1513) without issue then secondly Sir Thomas Neville (c.1484–1542) with whom she had an only child, Margaret Neville.

Dacre's elder brother, Ralph, was summoned to parliament by Henry VI as Baron Dacre in 1459. The brothers remained on the side of the House of Lancaster when Henry VI was deposed by Edward IV of the House of York, and both fought for Lancaster at the Battle of Towton of 1461. His brother Ralph was killed in the fighting, and after the battle, Dacre and his brother were attainted, but he had received a general pardon by 21 June 1468.

Dacre was appointed Chief Forester of Inglewood Forest in 1469/70, and the attainder of 1461 was reversed on 8 February 1472, whereupon Dacre inherited most of the family estates under entails created by his father, although possession was disputed by the heir general, Dacre's niece Joan Fiennes, the only child of his eldest brother, Sir Thomas Dacre (1410–1448).

On 8 April 1473 King Edward IV confirmed Dacre as heir male of his father, but allowed the Barony of Dacre to pass to the heir general. By letters patent he created Dacre Baron Dacre of Gilsland, declaring "that the said Humfrey Dacre, Knight, and the heirs male of the body of the said Thomas, late Lord Dacre, comyng, bee reputed, had, named and called the Lord Dacre of Gillesland".

Dacre was summoned to the House of Lords between 15 November 1482 and 9 December 1483, the writs of summons being addressed to Humfrido Dacre de Gillesland. On 6 July 1483, he attended the coronation of Richard III.

He was Governor of Carlisle Castle and Warden of the West Marches from 1484. He died of natural causes on 30 May 1485 and was succeeded by his son Thomas Dacre, 2nd Baron Dacre (c. 1464–1525).

Dacre's widow Mabel, Lady Dacre, died on 14 November 1508 and was buried with her husband's remains at Lanercost Priory, Cumberland.

== Notes ==
Peerage of England
Preceded by New creation	Baron Dacre; 1473–1485	Succeeded by Thomas Dacre
