= Henry FitzHugh, 3rd Baron FitzHugh =

Henry FitzHugh KG
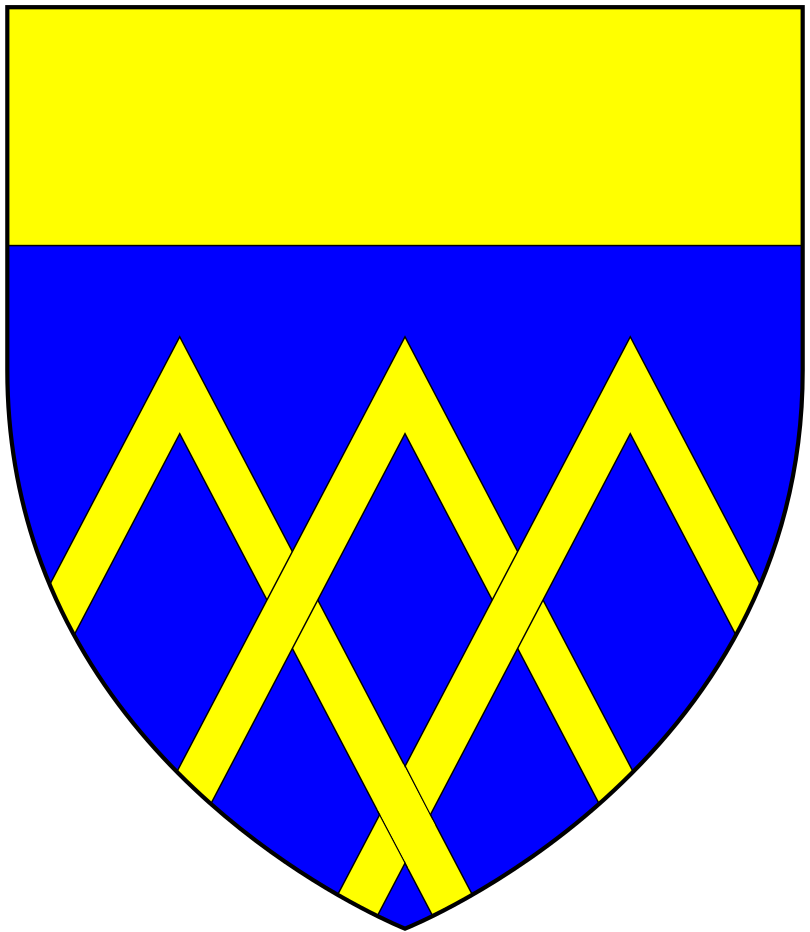
- Arms of FitzHugh: Azure, three chevrons interlaced in base or a chief of the last

Chamberlain of the Household

Baron FitzHugh
- In office 1413–1425
- Monarchs: Henry V Henry VI
- Preceded by: The Lord Grey of Codnor
- Succeeded by: The Lord Cromwell

Treasurer of England
- In office 1416–1421
- Monarch: Henry V
- Preceded by: Sir Robert Leche
- Succeeded by: William Kinwolmarsh

Personal details
- Born: c. 1363
- Died: 14 January 1425
- Resting place: Jervaulx Abbey, Yorkshire, England
- Occupation: Administrator and diplomat

Henry FitzHugh, 3rd Baron FitzHugh (c. 1363 – 11 January 1425) of Ravensworth Castle in North Yorkshire, was an administrator and diplomat who served under Kings Henry IV and Henry V.

== Origins ==
FitzHugh was the first son of Hugh FitzHugh, 2nd Baron FitzHugh (A descendant of Akarius Fitz Bardolph,), by his wife Joan Scrope, daughter of Henry Scrope, 1st Baron Scrope of Masham.

== Royal service ==
He was summoned by writ to parliament in 1388, and became active in public affairs following the succession of Henry IV to the throne. He was engaged in Anglo-Scottish diplomacy and took part in the Battle of Humbleton Hill in 1402 and in the negotiation of the surrender of his uncle, Richard le Scrope, Archbishop of York, in 1405. In 1406 he travelled to Denmark as part of the escort of Princess Philippa, daughter of King Henry IV, for her marriage to Eric of Pomerania, king of Denmark, Norway and Sweden.

At the coronation of King Henry V in 1413, FitzHugh served as Lord Constable. During the reign of Henry V, he served as Chamberlain of the Household (1413–1425, and into the reign of Henry VI), and as Treasurer of England (1416–1421). He participated in the Battle of Agincourt in 1415 and subsequent diplomacy with the French, which led to the Treaty of Troyes in 1420. He travelled with the king to France, and escorted the king's remains back to England following his death in 1422. He was an executor of Henry's will and was a feoffee of various lands in the will.

He was appointed a Knight of the Garter in about 1409.

== Religious foundations ==
During his travels to the Scandinavian Peninsula in 1406, he visited the Bridgettine Vadstena Abbey in Sweden, where he volunteered to help establish a Bridgettine community in England, and to donate for that purpose his manor of Cherry Hinton in Cambridgeshire. The result was Syon Monastery, established by Henry V in 1415 at Twickenham, Middlesex. He attended the Council of Constance in 1415.

== Marriage and children ==
He married Elizabeth Grey (born c. 1363), daughter of Sir Robert de Grey (a son of John de Grey, 1st Baron Grey de Rotherfield and his second wife the heiress Avice Marmion) by his wife Lora St. Quentin. In the next generation the FitzHugh family thenceforth quartered the arms of Marmion and St. Quentin, as shown later in the arms of Queen Katherine Parr and later still by Herbert, Earls of Pembroke, visible in Wilton House. By his wife he had eight sons and six daughters, including:

- William FitzHugh, 4th Baron FitzHugh, eldest son and heir, who married Margery Willoughby, a daughter of William Willoughby, 5th Baron Willoughby de Eresby. His son was Henry FitzHugh, 5th Baron FitzHugh who married Lady Alice Neville, sister of Richard Neville, 16th Earl of Warwick "The Kingmaker". By his marriage to Lady Alice Neville; the 5th Baron was the great-grandfather of Queen Katherine Parr.
- Robert FitzHugh, Bishop of London;
- Eleanor FitzHugh, who married three times; firstly to Philip Darcy, 6th Baron Darcy of Knayth and was the mother of Elizabeth Darcy, wife of Sir James Strangeways. Eleanor married secondly to Thomas Tunstall and thirdly to Sir Henry Bromflete, Baron Vessy.
- Elizabeth FitzHugh, a lady-in-waiting to queen consort Margaret of Anjou, who married twice; firstly on 10 December 1427 to Sir Ralph Gray of Chillingham (d.17 March 1442/3) and secondly, in 1445, to Sir Edmund Montfort. Her only issue was by her first husband.
- Maud FitzHugh, wife of Sir William Eure of Witton.
- Laura (alias Lora) FitzHugh, wife of Sir Maurice de Berkeley of Beverstone Castle in Gloucestershire.

== Death and burial ==
He died on 11 January 1425 and was buried in Jervaulx Abbey in Yorkshire, as he requested.

Political offices
Preceded by The Lord Grey of Codnor	Chamberlain of the Household; 1413–1425	Succeeded by The Lord Cromwell
Preceded by Sir Robert Leche	Treasurer of England; 1416–1421	Succeeded by William Kinwolmarsh
Peerage of England
Preceded by Hugh FitzHugh	Baron FitzHugh; 1386–1425	Succeeded by William FitzHugh
