= Baron FitzHugh =

Abeyant title in the Peerage of England

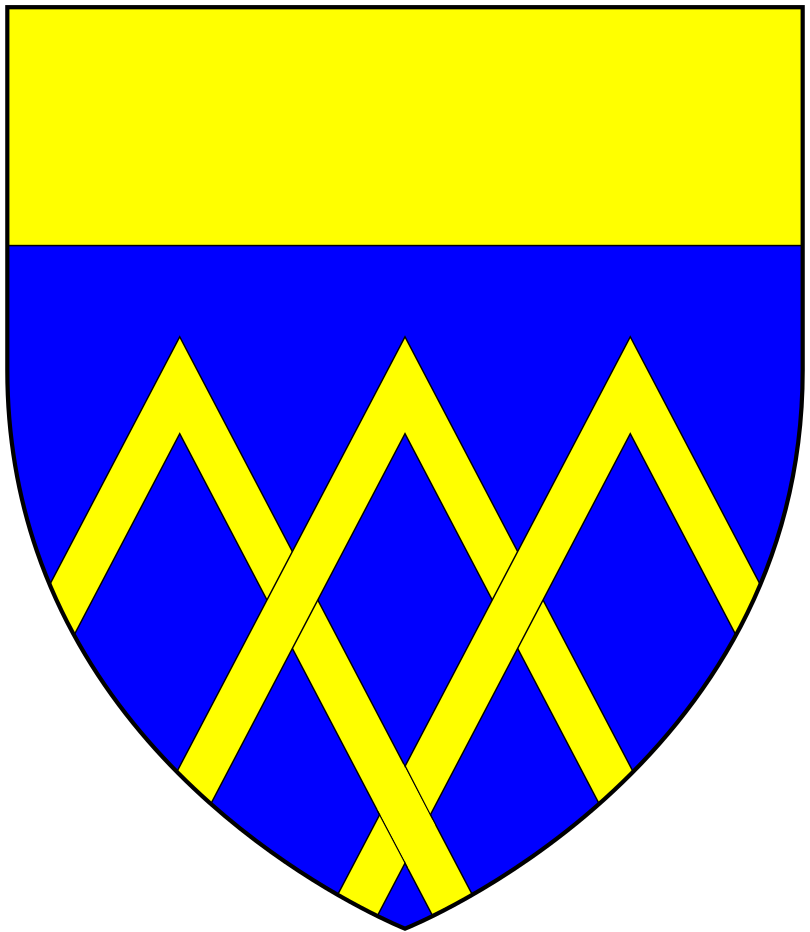
Arms of FitzHugh: Azure, three chevrons interlaced in base or a chief of the last. These arms were quartered by Queen Katherine Parr, her brother William Parr, 1st Marquess of Northampton and later by the Herbert family, Earls of Pembroke, and are visible in Wilton House

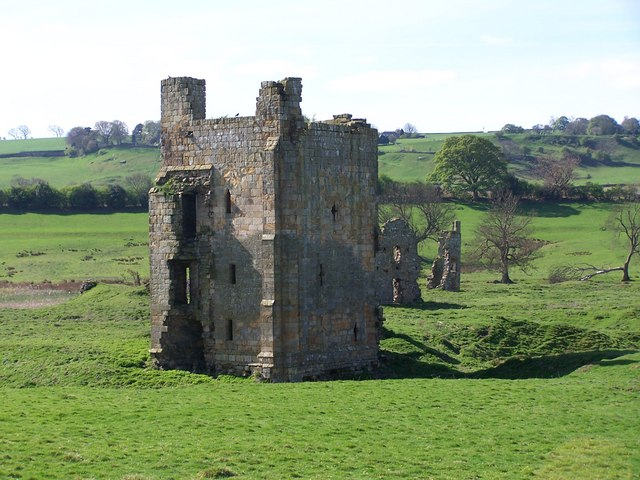
Remnant of Ravensworth Castle, North Yorkshire, seat of the FitzHugh family until the 16th century

Baron FitzHugh, of Ravensworth in North Yorkshire, is an abeyant title in the Peerage of England. It was created in 1321 for Sir Henry FitzHugh. The title passed through the male line until the death in 1513 of George FitzHugh, 7th Baron FitzHugh, when it became abeyant between his great-aunts Alice, Lady Fiennes and Elizabeth, Lady Parr, and to their descendants living today, listed below. The family seat was Ravensworth Castle in North Yorkshire, situated 4.5 miles (7.2 km) north-west of Richmond Castle, caput of the Honour of Richmond, one of the most important fiefdoms in Norman England.

== Barons FitzHugh (1321) ==
- Henry FitzHugh, 1st Baron FitzHugh (d. 1356), son and heir of Sir Hugh FitzHenry (d.1305; younger son and eventual heir of Sir Henry FitzRandolf of Ravensworth) who in 1301 signed the Barons' Letter to the Pope as Hugo filius Henrici Dominus de Raveneswath.
- Hugh FitzHugh, 2nd Baron FitzHugh (d. 1386), who married Joan Scrope, daughter of Henry Scrope, 1st Baron Scrope of Masham.
- Henry FitzHugh, 3rd Baron FitzHugh (c. 1358–1425), KG, who served in the French wars with Henry V and held an important position at the court of Henry IV; was made Constable of England at the coronation of Henry V, and seems to have been on intimate terms with both these monarchs. Was in charge of Princess Philippa of England, daughter of Henry IV, during her journey to Lund, Sweden in 1406 to be married to King Eric XIII. Married Elizabeth Grey, granddaughter of the 2nd Baron Grey of Rotherfield, one of the original Knights of the Garter instituted at its foundation in 1344. They had thirteen children, including Robert FitzHugh and Eleanor FitzHugh, wife of Philip Darcy, 6th Baron Darcy de Knayth. In 1423, jewels worth £40,000 were delivered to Sir Henry by a grateful Henry V.
- William FitzHugh, 4th Baron FitzHugh (c. 1399–1452), who married Margery Willoughby, daughter of William Willoughby, 5th Baron Willoughby de Eresby and Lucy le Strange. They had seven daughters and one son, the 5th Baron.
- Henry FitzHugh, 5th Baron FitzHugh (c. 1429–1472), who married Lady Alice Neville. The arms of FitzHugh (quartering Marmion of Tanfield Castle) impaling Neville (quartering Montacute and Monthermer) survive in a stained glass window in St. Mary's Church, Wath-by-Rippon, Yorkshire. They had five sons and six daughters, including Elizabeth FitzHugh, who married William Parr, 1st Baron Parr of Kendal and then Nicholas Vaux, 1st Baron Vaux of Harrowden. From her first marriage, Elizabeth was the mother of Sir Thomas Parr whose daughter was Queen Katherine Parr, the last wife of King Henry VIII.
- Richard FitzHugh, 6th Baron FitzHugh (c. 1458–1487), son of Henry, married Elizabeth Burgh, daughter of Thomas Burgh, 1st Baron Borough of Gainsborough.
- George FitzHugh, 7th Baron FitzHugh (c. 1487–1513), son of Richard, married Katherine Dacre, daughter of Humphrey Dacre, 1st Baron Dacre and Mabel Parr (great-aunt to Katherine Parr); they had no children. The title became abeyant with his death in 1513.

== Co-heirs ==
Co-heirs to the barony are descendants of Alice FitzHugh and Anne Parr, Countess of Pembroke, both daughter and granddaughter of the 5th Baron FitzHugh:

- Emily Beamish, 29th Baroness Dacre (b. 1983)
- Tessa Ogilvie Thompson (b. 1934)
- Francis Brand, 7th Viscount Hampden (b. 1970)
- William Herbert, 18th Earl of Pembroke (b. 1978)

== Sources ==
- Crofts Peerage Online Baron FitzHugh
