= Joan Dacre, 7th Baroness Dacre =

Joan Dacre, 7th Baroness Dacre (c. 1433 (Note: Dacre was 25 years old in 1458.) – 8 March 1485/86) was a suo jure peeress of England. She was born in Gilsland, the daughter of Sir Thomas Dacre (1410–1448) and Elizabeth Bowett.

== Marriage ==
Joan Dacre married Sir Richard Fiennes in June 1446. She succeeded her grandfather, Thomas Dacre, 6th Baron Dacre, to the Barony of Dacre suo jure on 5 January 1457/58. Her husband, Sir Richard, was titled Baron Dacre, by right of his wife, and awarded the Dacre manors as the result of the attainder of her uncles following the Battle of Towton.

Later, a dispute arose between Sir Richard and Humphrey Dacre, Joan's uncle, regarding the barony. King Edward IV decided the matter in 1473, by confirming the Barony of Dacre to Sir Richard Fiennes and Joan, while the manor of Gilsland was adjudged to Humphrey, who had previously been liberated of the attainder. He was at the same time created Baron Dacre of Gilsland, with right of precedency next after Sir Richard Fiennes, jure uxoris 7th Baron Dacre.

Children of Joan Dacre and Sir Richard Fiennes:

- Sir John Fiennes, married Alice FitzHugh, by whom he had issue Thomas Fiennes, 8th Baron Dacre, and Anne, the wife of William de Berkeley, 1st Marquess of Berkeley.
- Elizabeth Fiennes, married John Clinton, 6th Baron Clinton.

== Death ==
Joan died at Herstmonceux Castle, Sussex, England on 8 March 1485/86, and was succeeded by her grandson, Sir Thomas Fiennes, 8th Baron Dacre.

Peerage of England
Preceded by Thomas Dacre, 6th Baron Dacre	Baron Dacre; 1458–1486	Succeeded by Thomas Fiennes, 8th Baron Dacre

== Sources ==
- Cokayne, George Edward (1890). Complete Peerage of England, Scotland, Ireland, Great Britain and the United Kingdom, Extant, Extinct, Or Dormant. G. Bell & sons.
- Richardson, Douglas (2011). Plantagenet Ancestry: A Study In Colonial And Medieval Families, 2nd Edition, 2011. Douglas Richardson. pp. 612–614. ISBN 978-1-4610-4513-7.
