= Philippa Neville =

British noblewoman (1386–after 1453)

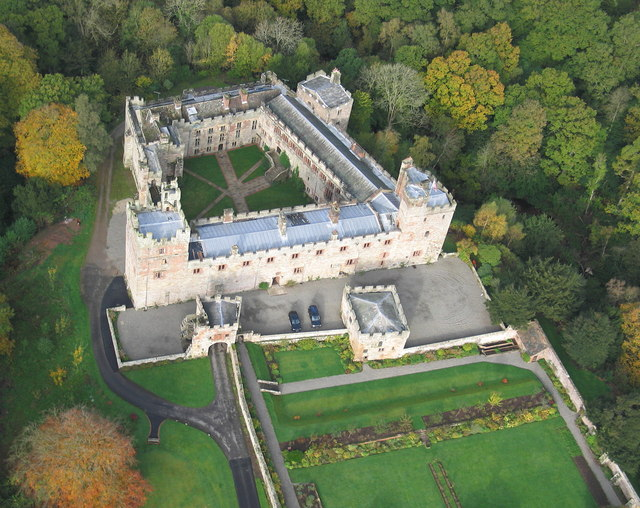
- Naworth Castle, seat of the Dacre family
- Born: 1386
- Died: after 8 July 1453
- Noble family: Neville (by birth); Dacre (by marriage)
- Spouse: Thomas Dacre, 6th Baron Dacre
- Issue: Sir Thomas Dacre; Randolph Dacre; Humphrey Dacre; Ralph Dacre; Richard Dacre; George Dacre; John Dacre; Joan Dacre; Margaret Dacre
- Father: Ralph Neville, 1st Earl of Westmorland
- Mother: Margaret Stafford

Philippa Neville, Baroness Dacre (1386–after 1453) was the third daughter of Ralph Neville, 1st Earl of Westmorland, by his first wife, Margaret Stafford.

Philippa's younger half-sister was Cecily Neville, making Edward IV and Richard III her nephews. Her younger half-brother was Richard Neville, 5th Earl of Salisbury. His son, also Philippa's nephew, was Richard Neville, 16th Earl of Warwick who was nicknamed "Warwick the Kingmaker" and whose home and stronghold was Warwick Castle where he imprisoned his cousin, Edward IV.

== Marriage and issue ==
Born in 1386, Philippa was the daughter of Ralph Neville, 1st Earl of Westmorland, by his first wife, Margaret Stafford. On 20 July 1399, Philippa was married to Thomas Dacre, 6th Baron Dacre the son of William Dacre, 5th Baron Dacre and Joan Douglas.

They had:

- Sir Thomas Dacre (d. before 5 January 1458), who married Elizabeth Bowet
- Ranulph or Ralph Dacre, 1st Baron Dacre of the North, who married Eleanor FitzHugh, by whom he had no issue. He was slain at the Battle of Towton on 29 March 1461.
- Humphrey Dacre, 1st Baron Dacre of Gilsland (d. 30 May 1485), who married Mabel Parr (d. 14 November 1508)
- Ralph Dacre.
- Richard Dacre.
- George Dacre.
- John Dacre.
- Joan Dacre, who married Thomas Clifford, 8th Baron de Clifford.
- Margaret Dacre, who married John le Scrope.

Philippa's husband, Thomas Dacre, 6th Baron Dacre of Gilsland, died 5 January 1458. She died after 1453.

== Sources ==
- Ashdown-Hill, John (2018). Cecily Neville: Mother of Richard III. Pen & Sword. ISBN 9781526706348.
- Cokayne, George Edward (1916). The Complete Peerage, edited by Vicary Gibbs. Vol. IV. London: St. Catherine Press.
- Richardson, Douglas (2011). Magna Carta Ancestry: A Study in Colonial and Medieval Families, ed. Kimball G. Everingham. Vol. II (2nd ed.). Salt Lake City. ISBN 1449966381
