= Roger Fiennes =

English knight (1384–1449)

Sir Roger Fiennes

High Sheriff of Surrey and Sussex
- In office 1422–1422
- Preceded by: John Bolvey / James Knotesford
- Succeeded by: John Wintershall
- In office 1435–1435
- Preceded by: Richard Waller
- Succeeded by: Richard Dalingrugg

Personal details
- Born: 1384 Herstmonceux, East Sussex, England
- Died: 1449 (aged 64–65) Herstmonceux, East Sussex, England
- Resting place: All Saints Churchyard, Herstmonceux

Sir Roger Fiennes (1384–1449) was an English knight of the shire, High Sheriff of Surrey and Sussex, and builder of Herstmonceux Castle. He was also Treasurer of King Henry VI's household.

== Origins ==
Roger Fiennes was the son of William de Fiennes, Sheriff of Surrey and Sussex in 1396, and Elizabeth Battisford. He was baptised at Herstmonceux on 14 September 1384. His younger brother was James Fiennes, 1st Baron Saye and Sele.

== Career ==
Sir Roger was knighted before 1412, accompanied King Henry V to France and fought at Agincourt in 1415.

Sir Roger was prominent in the politics and a prominent member of the royal household. He was Knight of the Shire for Sussex in 1416, 1429, 1439, 1442 and 1445. He was Constable of Portchester Castle from 1421 until his death, Sheriff of Surrey and Sussex for 1422 and 1434, Treasurer of the Household for King Henry VI between 1439 and 1446, Keeper of the King's Wardrobe, and Chief Steward of the Duchy of Lancaster from 1441 to 1447. He financed the initial construction of Herstmonceux Castle with spoils from the Hundred Years' War.

== Herstmonceux Castle ==
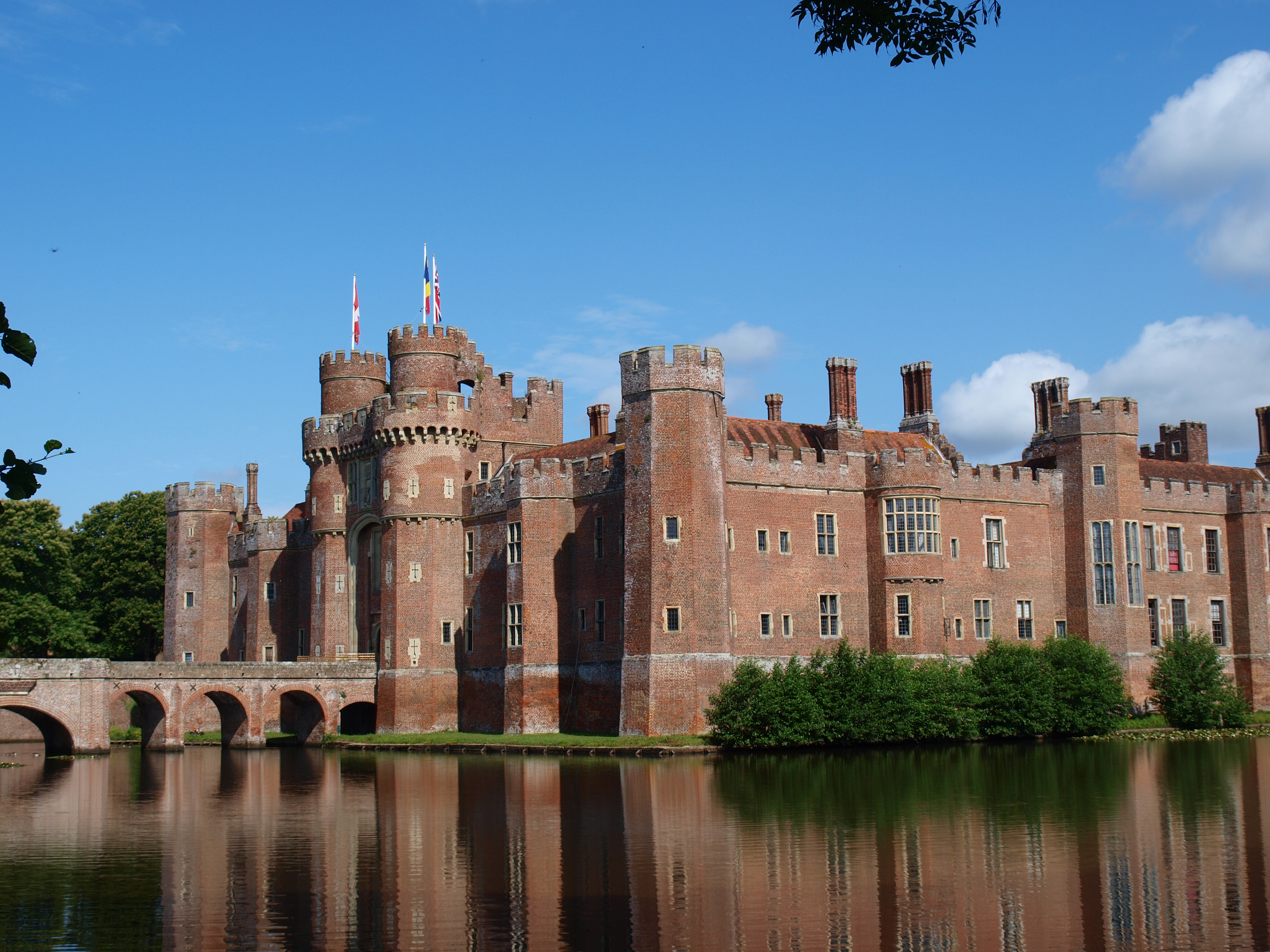
Herstmonceux Castle

Roger Fiennes was ultimately responsible for the construction of Herstmonceux Castle in the County of Sussex. He needed a house fitting a man of his position, so construction of the castle on the site of the old manor house began in 1441. It was through his position as treasurer that he could afford the £3,800 construction cost of the original castle. The castle is not a defensive structure, but a palatial residence.

== Marriage and children ==
Before 1422, Fiennes married Elizabeth Holland, daughter of Sir John Holland and his second wife, Margaret. John Holland's father, Robert, 2nd Baron Holland, was the brother of Thomas Holland, 1st Earl of Kent.

Roger Fiennes and Elizabeth Holland had two boys and one girl:

- Richard Fiennes, 7th Baron Dacre
- Sir Robert Fiennes
- Margaret Fiennes, who married Sir Nicholas Carew of Beddington

Sir Roger Fiennes died in 1449. His will was dated at Buxted, Sussex 29 October 1449 and proved on 18 November 1449. He requested to be buried at All Saints, Herstmonceux, in his will.
