= William FitzHugh, 4th Baron FitzHugh =

Member of the Parliament of England

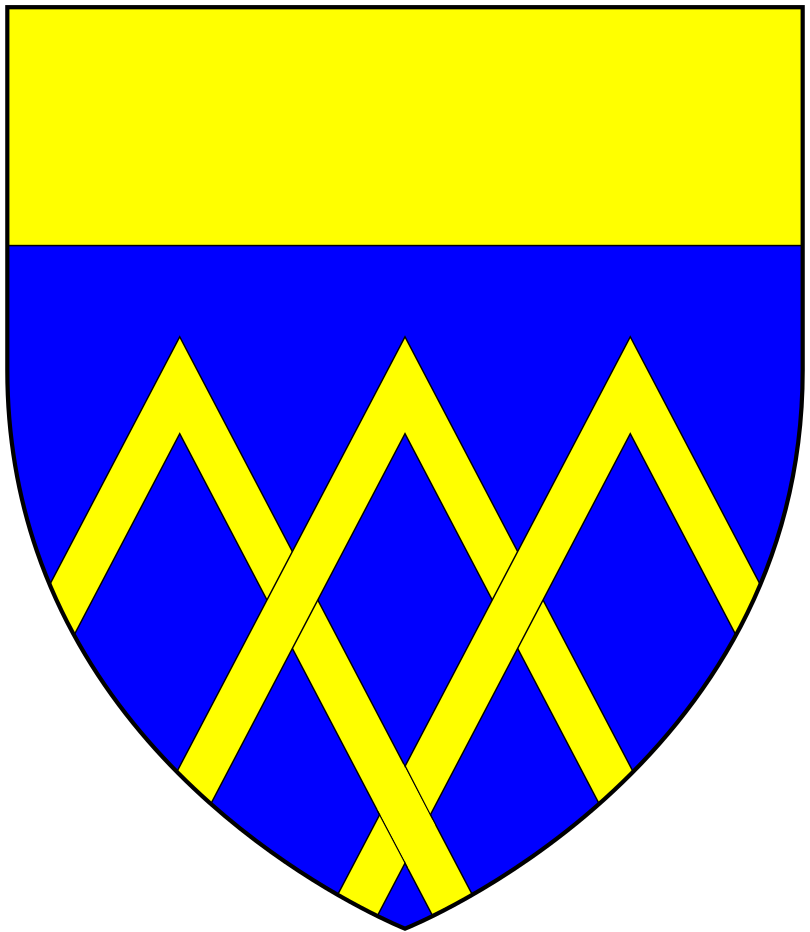
Arms of FitzHugh: Azure, three chevrons interlaced in base or a chief of the last

William FitzHugh, 4th Baron FitzHugh (c. 1399 – 22 October 1452) was an English nobleman.

Born at Ravensworth, North Riding of Yorkshire, England. He was the son of Henry FitzHugh, 3rd Baron FitzHugh and Elizabeth Grey. He served as a peer in Parliament from 1429 to 1450.

FitzHugh married, before 18 November 1406, at Ravensworth, Margery Willoughby, daughter of William Willoughby, 5th Baron Willoughby de Eresby, and Lucy le Strange, by whom he had a son and seven daughters:

- Henry FitzHugh, 5th Baron FitzHugh, who married Lady Alice Neville, daughter of Richard Neville, 5th Earl of Salisbury and Alice Montacute (Montague), 5th Countess of Salisbury, daughter and heiress of Thomas de Montacute, 4th Earl of Salisbury and Lady Eleanor Holland. They were great-grandparents to Queen Consort Katherine Parr.
- Elizabeth FitzHugh, who married Ralph Greystoke, 5th Baron Greystoke.
- Eleanor FitzHugh, who married Ranulph Dacre, 1st Baron Dacre of Gilsland.
- Maud FitzHugh, who married Sir William Bowes (d. 28 July 1466) of Streatlam, Durham, by whom she was the grandmother of Sir Robert Bowes.
- Lora FitzHugh, who married Sir John Constable of Halsham, Yorkshire.
- Lucy, who became a nun.
- Margery FitzHugh, who married John Melton.
- Joan FitzHugh, who married John Scrope, 5th Baron Scrope of Bolton.

== Coat of arms ==
The coat of arms of FitzHugh – Azure, three chevrons interlaced in base or a chief of the last. These arms were quartered by Queen Katherine Parr and later by the Herbert family, Earls of Pembroke, and are visible in Wilton House.

== Bibliography ==
- Richardson, Douglas (2011). Everingham, Kimball G. (ed.). Magna Carta Ancestry: A Study in Colonial and Medieval Families. Vol. I (2nd ed.). Salt Lake City. ISBN 978-1449966379.
- Richardson, Douglas (2011). Everingham, Kimball G. (ed.). Magna Carta Ancestry: A Study in Colonial and Medieval Families. Vol. II (2nd ed.). Salt Lake City. ISBN 978-1449966386.
- Douglas Richardson. Royal Ancestry: A Study in Colonial and Medieval Families, 5 vols, ed. Kimball G. Everingham (Salt Lake City: the author, 2013), Vol. II, pp. 632–633, FITZHUGH 15
