= Alice Neville =

English noblewoman

- Baroness FitzHugh of Ravensworth
- Born: c. 1430; Wessex
- Died: after 22 November 1503
- Noble family: Neville
- Spouse: Henry FitzHugh, 5th Baron FitzHugh of Ravensworth
- Issue: Richard FitzHugh, 6th Baron FitzHugh; George FitzHugh, Dean of Lincoln; Edward FitzHugh; Thomas FitzHugh; John FitzHugh; Alice FitzHugh; Elizabeth FitzHugh; Anne FitzHugh; Margery FitzHugh; Joan FitzHugh; Eleanor FitzHugh
- Father: Richard Neville, 5th Earl of Salisbury
- Mother: Lady Alice Montague, 5th Countess of Salisbury

Alice Neville, Baroness FitzHugh (c. 1430 – after 22 November 1503) or Lady Alice FitzHugh, was an English noblewoman and lady-in-waiting. She was the wife of Henry FitzHugh, 5th Baron FitzHugh. She was the great-grandmother of queen consort Katherine Parr and her siblings, Anne and William, and was one of the sisters of Warwick the 'Kingmaker'. Her family was one of the oldest and most powerful families of the North. They had a long-standing tradition of military service and a reputation for seeking power at the cost of the loyalty to the crown as was demonstrated by her brother, the Earl of Warwick.

== Family ==
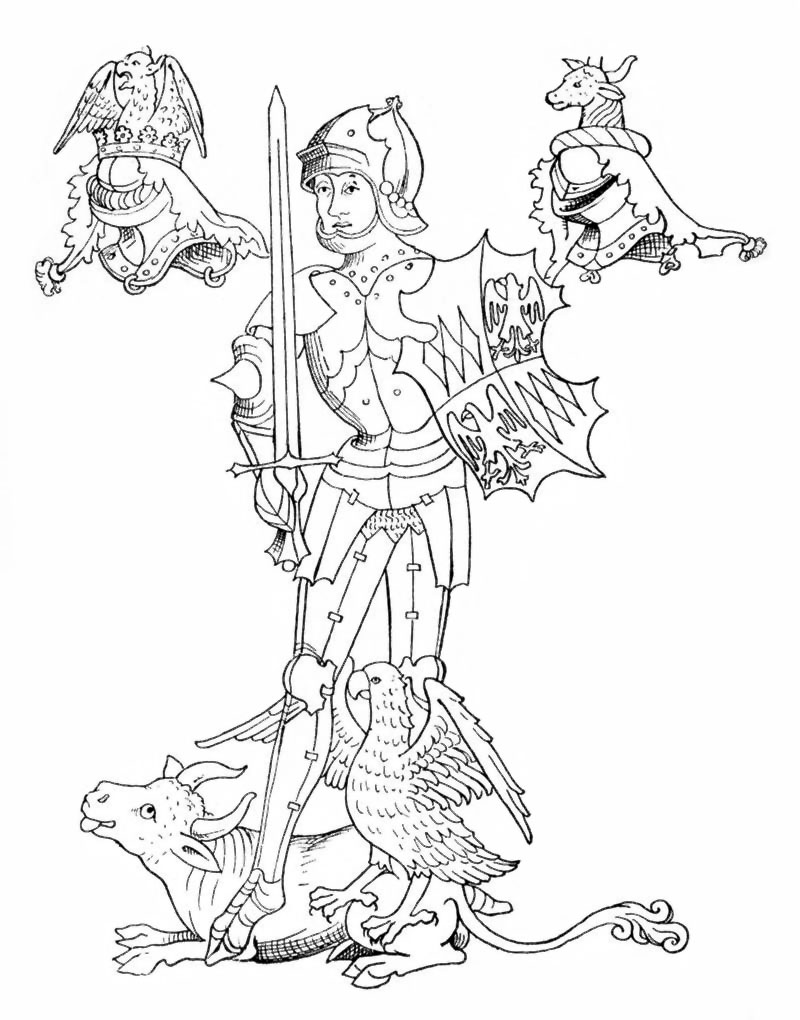
Richard Neville, 16th Earl of Warwick, also known as Warwick the Kingmaker, was the eldest brother of Alice Neville.

Lady Alice was the third daughter of Richard Neville, 5th Earl of Salisbury jure uxoris and Lady Alice Montacute, 5th Countess of Salisbury suo jure. By her father she was a descendant of King Edward III through the legitimised children of John of Gaunt, 1st Duke of Lancaster and his mistress, later wife, Katherine Swynford. Her mother was the only child and sole heiress of Thomas Montacute, 4th Earl of Salisbury by his first wife Lady Eleanor Holland. Lady Alice was the sister of Richard Neville, 16th Earl of Warwick, the wealthiest and most powerful English peer of his age. Warwick was the most important and influential peer in the realm, and one of the principal protagonists in the Wars of the Roses. Her aunt, Cecily Neville, Duchess of York, mother of future kings and Alice's first cousins, Edward IV and Richard III, was another key figure in the dynastic civil wars that dominated most of the latter half of 15th-century England.

Alice's other siblings included Lady Joan Neville, Countess of Arundel; Cecily Neville, Duchess of Warwick; John Neville, 1st Marquess of Montagu; George Neville, Archbishop of York and Chancellor of England; Lady Eleanor Neville (who died in 1472 before her husband was created Earl of Derby); Lady Katherine Neville, Baroness Hastings; Sir Thomas Neville (1443–1460); and Lady Margaret Neville, Countess of Oxford.

Arms of Neville: Gules, a saltire argent, with a label compony of Beaufort for difference, due to her father's mother Joan Beaufort, a legitimised daughter of John of Gaunt

Lady FitzHugh's nieces, the daughters of Warwick, were Isabel Neville, who married Edward IV's brother George Plantagenet, 1st Duke of Clarence and Anne Neville. Anne was Princess of Wales as the wife of Edward of Westminster, Prince of Wales, the son of Henry VI and Margaret of Anjou. After the battlefield death of the Prince of Wales at 17 years old at the Battle of Tewkesbury on 4 May 1471, Anne eventually became queen consort of England upon her second marriage to Richard, Duke of Gloucester, who became King of England as Richard III in 1483.

== Lady-in-waiting ==
Lady Alice, who was close to her niece Anne Neville, was very supportive of the Duke of Gloucester after he had become Lord Protector of the Realm. She influenced her family members to do the same. When Gloucester ascended the throne as King Richard III in 1483, Lady Alice and her daughter, Elizabeth, were appointed by the queen to serve as her ladies-in-waiting. The two received presents from the King which included yards of the grandest cloth available to make dresses. At the coronation in 1483, it was Alice and Elizabeth who were two of the seven noble ladies given the honour to ride behind the queen.

The position of lady-in-waiting to the queens of England became a family tradition spanning down to Lady FitzHugh's great-granddaughter, Anne Parr, who served all of King Henry VIII's six wives.

Lady FitzHugh was very much the same temperament of her brother the Earl of Warwick. Although her husband, Henry, Lord FitzHugh is generally given credit for instigating the 1470 rebellion which drew King Edward IV into the north and allowed a safe landing of the Earl of Warwick in the West country, the boldness of the stroke is far more in keeping with Alice, Lady FitzHugh's temperament and abilities than with her husband's.

After the death of her husband in 1483, Lady FitzHugh along with her children Richard, Roger, Edward, Thomas, and Elizabeth joined the Corpus Christi guild at York.

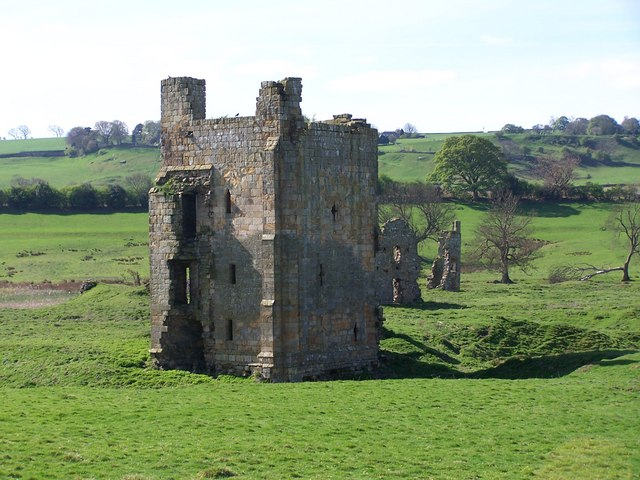
Ravensworth Castle, home of the Lord FitzHughs of Ravensworth until it was transferred to Alice and Henry's descendants by Sir Thomas Parr

== Marriage and issue ==
Lady Alice married Henry, Lord FitzHugh of Ravensworth Castle, near Richmond (1429–72), head of a powerful local family between Tees and Swale. Lord and Lady FitzHugh had 11 children; five sons and six daughters:

- Sir Richard, 6th Baron FitzHugh, who married Elizabeth Burgh, daughter of Thomas Burgh of Gainsborough. Their son, George, inherited the barony of FitzHugh, but after his death in 1513 the barony fell into abeyance between his aunt Alice and her nephew Sir Thomas Parr, son of his other aunt Elizabeth. This abeyance continues to the present day.
- George FitzHugh, Dean of Lincoln from 1483 to 1505
- Alice FitzHugh married Sir John Fiennes, the son of Sir Richard Fiennes and Joan Dacre, 7th Baroness Dacre.
- Elizabeth FitzHugh, who married, firstly, William Parr and, secondly, Sir Nicholas Vaux. By her first husband, Elizabeth was the grandmother to queen consort Katherine Parr, Anne, Countess of Pembroke, and William, Marquess of Northampton.
- Anne, wife of Francis Lovell, 1st Viscount Lovell
- Margery, who married Sir Marmaduke Constable
- Joan, who became a nun
- Edward FitzHugh (d.s.p.)
- Thomas FitzHugh (d.s.p.)
- John FitzHugh (d.s.p.)
- Eleanor FitzHugh

== Ancestry ==
Ancestors of Alice Neville

16. Ralph Neville, 2nd Baron Neville de Raby
8. John Neville, 3rd Baron Neville de Raby
17. Alice Audley
4. Ralph de Neville, 1st Earl of Westmorland
18. Henry Percy, 2nd Baron Percy
9. Maud Percy
19. Idoine de Clifford
2. Richard Neville, 5th Earl of Salisbury
20. Edward III, King of England
10. John of Gaunt, 1st Duke of Lancaster
21. Philippa of Hainault
5. Lady Joan Beaufort
22. Payne Roet
11. Katherine Roët, Duchess of Lancaster
23.
1. Lady Alice Neville, Lady FitzHugh
24. Sir John de Montacute, 1st Baron Montacute
12. John Montacute, 3rd Earl of Salisbury
25. Margaret de Monthermer
6. Thomas Montacute, 4th Earl of Salisbury
26. Sir Adam Francis
13. Maud Francis
27. Alice Champneys
3. Alice Montacute, 5th Countess of Salisbury
28. Thomas Holland, 1st Earl of Kent
14. Thomas Holland, 2nd Earl of Kent
29. Joan, Princess of Wales, 4th Countess of Kent
7. Lady Eleanor Holland
30. Richard Fitzalan, 10th Earl of Arundel
15. Lady Alice FitzAlan
31. Lady Eleanor of Lancaster

== See also ==
- Percy–Neville feud
