= Thomas Parr (MP for Westmorland) =

Member of the Parliament of England

Sir Thomas Parr (1407 – November 1461 or 24 November 1464) was an English landowner and elected Member of Parliament six times between 1435 and 1459. He was great-grandfather of Queen Catherine Parr, the sixth wife of King Henry VIII.

== Ancestry ==
The Parr family originally came from Parr, Lancashire. Sir Thomas's grandfather, Sir William de Parre (died 1405), son of Sir John de Parre, lord of Parr; married, in 1383, Elizabeth, daughter of John de Ros, and granddaughter and heiress of Sir Thomas de Ros, Baron of Kendal.

== Biography ==
Sir Thomas was the son of Sir John Parr of Kendal and Agnes Crophull (or Crophill) (c.1371/72-3 February 1436) By his mother's previous marriage to Sir Walter Devereux of Weobley, he was the maternal half-brother of Elizabeth and Walter Devereux, Esq., the great-grandfather of Anne Devereux who married William Herbert, 1st Earl of Pembroke (1468 creation). His father died before 6 October 1407 and when his mother remarried to John Merbury, Esq. he was made the ward of Sir Thomas Tunstall of Thurland Castle, Lancashire. About 1413 he married Alice Tunstall, the daughter of Sir Thomas.

Within a year of his coming of age Thomas was escheator of Cumberland and Westmorland, and was knighted about the same time. He was elected Member of Parliament for Westmorland five times (in 1435, 1449, 1450, 1455 and 1459) and once for Cumberland (1445). He was actively involved in local administration and law enforcement, and became very influential. In 1435, he acted as the Under-sheriff for Thomas, 8th Baron Clifford, the hereditary sheriff of Westmorland. He became involved in a long-running feud with Sir Henry Bellingham, another local landowner, which came to a head in 1445 when he was attacked in London by Bellingham's men when attending Parliament, which caused a Parliamentary outcry.

By the time of the War of the Roses, Parr had formed close links with leading Yorkist Richard Neville, 5th Earl of Salisbury and when hostilities began joined him at the Battle of Ludford Bridge near Ludlow in 1459. After the Yorkists were defeated, he was forced to flee to Calais with Salisbury and was attainted in Parliament, but returned to fight at the Battle of Wakefield in 1460. He died in 1461.

== Descendants ==
By Alice Tunstall, he left three sons and six daughters. His eldest son, William married a granddaughter of the Earl of Salisbury, Elizabeth FitzHugh, and by her was grandfather of Queen Katherine Parr, wife of Henry VIII; his second son, Sir John Parr was made sheriff of Westmorland for life in 1462. His third son, Thomas, was killed at the Battle of Barnet in 1471. His daughters all married members of prominent northern families. Mabel married Humphrey Dacre, 1st Baron Dacre; thus becoming the first female Parr to marry into the peerage and be given a title. The accession of the Yorkist King Edward IV in 1461 had saved most of Sir Thomas's estates from confiscation.
