= Richard Fiennes, 7th Baron Dacre =

English knight

Richard Fiennes, 7th Baron Dacre jure uxoris (1415 – 25 November 1483) was an English politician and hereditary keeper of Herstmonceux Castle in Sussex.

== Life and ancestry ==
He was the son of Sir Roger Fiennes, Member of Parliament (M.P.) for Sussex, and Elizabeth Holland, whose paternal grandfather was the brother of Thomas Holland, 1st Earl of Kent. His paternal uncle was James Fiennes, 1st Baron Saye and Sele.

He was the hereditary keeper of Herstmonceux Castle, an office which descended in the Fiennes family until the execution of Thomas Fiennes, 9th Baron Dacre. By patent of 7 November 1458, King Henry VI of England accepted him as Lord Dacre, and by two writs in 1459 and 1482, he was summoned to Parliament as Baron Dacre.

In 1473, the King made the final award of the lands of the sixth Baron Dacre between the heir male (Humphrey Dacre, the younger of Joan Dacre's two surviving uncles) and the heir general (Richard Fiennes, in right of his wife, Joan Dacre, who had succeeded to the baronial title suo jure on 5 January 1458). Most of the estates went to the heir male, with remainder to the heir general, while the peerage went to Fiennes in right of his wife.

Peerage lawyers have claimed that Fiennes's summons to Parliament created a new barony, for though his wife was a peeress in her own right, his summons was not a courtesy one. J. Horace Round held that the award of 1473 assigning the heir general and her husband precedence of the old barony, over that of the heir male, was a recognition of his wife's accession to the original barony.

== Marriage and issue ==
In June 1446, he married Joan Dacre, 7th Baroness Dacre. Their children were:

- Sir John Fiennes, born c. 1447 at Herstmonceux Castle; married Alice FitzHugh; father of Thomas Fiennes, 8th Baron Dacre.
- Sir Thomas Fiennes
- Elizabeth Fiennes, married John Clinton, 6th Baron Clinton, great-grandfather of Edward Clinton, 1st Earl of Lincoln.
- Richard Fiennes
- Roger Fiennes

Another (unnamed) daughter was stated in the 1623 Heralds' Visitation of Gloucestershire to have been the first and short-lived wife of Sir Walter Denys (d. 1505) of Alveston, Glos., son/heir of Maurice Denys.
