= Cobham (surname) =

Cobham is a surname. Notable people with the surname include:

- Sir Alan Cobham, aviation pioneer
- Alan Cobham (mathematician), the namesake of Cobham's thesis in the computational complexity theory
- Anne Brooke, Baroness Cobham (1501–1558), English aristocrat and reported accuser of Queen Anne Boleyn
- Billy Cobham (born 1944), jazz musician
- Catherine Cobham, British translator
- David Cobham, British film and television producer
- Eleanor, Duchess of Gloucester, née Cobham, accused witch
- Eric Cobham, an early 18th-century pirate
- George Cobham, multiple people
- Henry Cobham, multiple people, including:
  - Henry de Cobham, 1st Baron Cobham (1260–1339), English peer
- John Cobham, multiple people
- Reginald de Cobham, 1st Baron Cobham (1295–1361), English knight and diplomat
- Thomas Cobham, multiple people
- Tilda Cobham-Hervey (b. 1994), Australian actress

== See also ==
- James de Cobham, English medieval Canon law jurist and university chancellor
