= Elizabeth Smith =

Elizabeth Smith may refer to:

== Politicians ==
- Elizabeth Andrews (1882–1960), née Smith, Welsh Labour Party politician, writer, and suffragist
- Elizabeth Rudel Smith (1911–1997), Treasurer of the United States
- Elizabeth Joan Smith (1928–2016), Canadian politician
- Liz Smith (politician) (born 1960), Scottish Conservative Party politician

== Writers ==
- Elizabeth Smith (translator) (1776–1806), English oriental scholar and translator
- Elizabeth Smith (diarist) (1797–1885), British diarist
- Elizabeth Conwell Smith Willson (1842–1864), American poet
- Elizabeth Oakes Smith (1806–1893), American poet, fiction writer, and women's rights activist
- Betty Smith (1896–1972), American author
- Liz Smith (journalist) (1923–2017), American gossip columnist
- Elizabeth A. T. Smith (born 1958), American art historian

== Mormons ==
- Elizabeth Ann Whitney (1800–1882), née Smith, Latter Day Saint leader
- Elizabeth Davis (Mormon) (1805–1844), wife of Joseph Smith Jr.

== Other ==
- Bessie Smith (1894–1937), American blues singer
- Madge Smith (1898–1974), Canadian photographer
- Liz Smith (actress) (1921–2016), English actress
- Elizabeth Smith, Baroness Smith of Gilmorehill (born 1940), British peer and patron of the arts
- Elizabeth W. Smith born 1952/3), finance executive
- Elizabeth Jane Smith (engineer) (1889–?), first woman to study engineering at a Scottish university
- Betty Smith (musician) (1926–2011), English saxophonist and singer
- Elizabeth Smith Middleton (1814–1898), English-born Canadian social reformer
- Elizabeth Smith Miller (1822–1911), American women's rights advocate
- Elizabeth Smith Shortt (1859–1949), Canadian physicist
- Betty Smith (American Dad!)
- Elizabeth "Libby" Smith, a character on Lost
- Elizabeth Smith (swimmer) (born 1996), American Paralympic swimmer
- Elizabeth Cisney Smith (1881–1965), American physician
- Elizabeth Joyce Smith (born 1956), Australian Anglican priest and hymnist
- Elizabeth Hallam Smith (born 1950), English historian and librarian

== See also ==
- Libby Smith (disambiguation)
- Betty Smith (disambiguation)
- Liz Smith (disambiguation)
- Eliza Smith (disambiguation)
- List of people with surname Smith
