= Cobham =

Cobham may refer to:

== Places ==
- Cobham, Kent, England
- Cobham, Surrey, England
- Cobham, South Australia, a former town in Australia
- Cobham, Albemarle County, Virginia, United States
- Cobham, Surry County, Virginia, United States

== Aviation ==
- Cobham (company), a British aerospace manufacturing company
- Cobham Aviation Services (disambiguation), an Australian airline

== People ==
- Cobham (surname)
- Baron Cobham
- Viscount Cobham

=== Other ===
- Cobham Intermediate School, Burnside, New Zealand
- Cobham Oval, a cricket pitch in Whangarei, New Zealand
- Cobham Training Centre, Academy of London-based Chelsea Football Club
- Cobham's Cubs, a political faction in the eighteenth century

== See also ==
- Chobham (disambiguation)
