= Eliza Smith =

Eliza Smith may refer to:

- Eliza Smith (writer) (died c. 1732), English cookery book writer
- Eliza Bland Smith Erskine Norton (born Eliza Bland Smith, 1795–1855), British poet
- Eliza Doyle Smith (1859–1932), American songwriter
- Eliza Kennedy Smith (1889–1964), American suffragist

== See also ==
- Liza Parker (now Liza Smith, born 1980), English badminton player
- Elizabeth Smith (disambiguation)
