= John Cobham =

John Cobham may refer to:

- John Cobham (MP) (died 1399), MP for Kent
- John Brooke alias Cobham (1535–1594), MP for Queenborough
- John Cobham (archdeacon of Totnes) (1873–1960), Anglican priest
- John Cobham (archdeacon of Durham) (1899–1987), Anglican priest and author
- John Cobham (judge), Justice of the Common Pleas
- John de Cobham, 2nd Baron Cobham (of Kent) (died 1355), English nobleman
- John de Cobham, 3rd Baron Cobham (died 1408)
