= Cooling, Kent =

Village in Kent, England

Coordinates: 51.4553°N 0.5262°E

Cooling
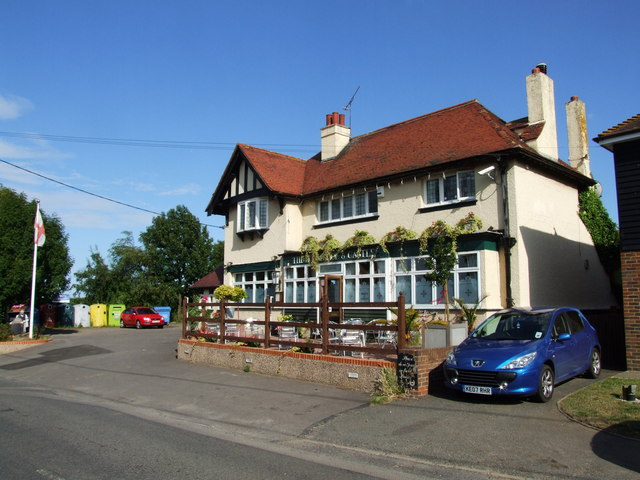
- The Horseshoe and Castle pub

- Location within Kent
- Population: 216 (2011)
- OS grid reference: TQ755760
- Civil parish: Cooling
- Unitary authority: Medway
- Ceremonial county: Kent
- Region: South East
- Country: England
- Sovereign state: United Kingdom
- Post town: ROCHESTER
- Postcode district: ME3
- Dialling code: 01634
- Police: Kent
- Fire: Kent
- Ambulance: South East Coast
- UK Parliament: Rochester and Strood

Cooling is a village and civil parish on the Hoo Peninsula, overlooking the North Kent Marshes, 6 miles north northwest of Rochester, England. According to the 2001 census the parish had a population of 209, which increased to 216 at the 2011 Census.

Cooling was recorded in the Domesday Book when it was held by Bishop Odo of Bayeux (half-brother of William the Conqueror). The most notable surviving feature of the village is Cooling Castle, built on the edge of the marshes during the 12th century to defend the neighbouring port of Cliffe from the threat of French raiders.

== Notable buildings ==
Cooling Castle, located at the west end of the village, was built by Sir John Cobham in the 1380s following a French raid on the Thames Estuary. In the early 15th century it was a home for Sir John Oldcastle. In January 1554 it was attacked and badly damaged in a brief siege by Sir Thomas Wyatt during his unsuccessful rebellion against Queen Mary. The castle was subsequently abandoned. A farmhouse and outbuildings were constructed within the ruins. Today the outer gatehouse of the castle can be seen from the side of the road between Cooling and Cliffe.

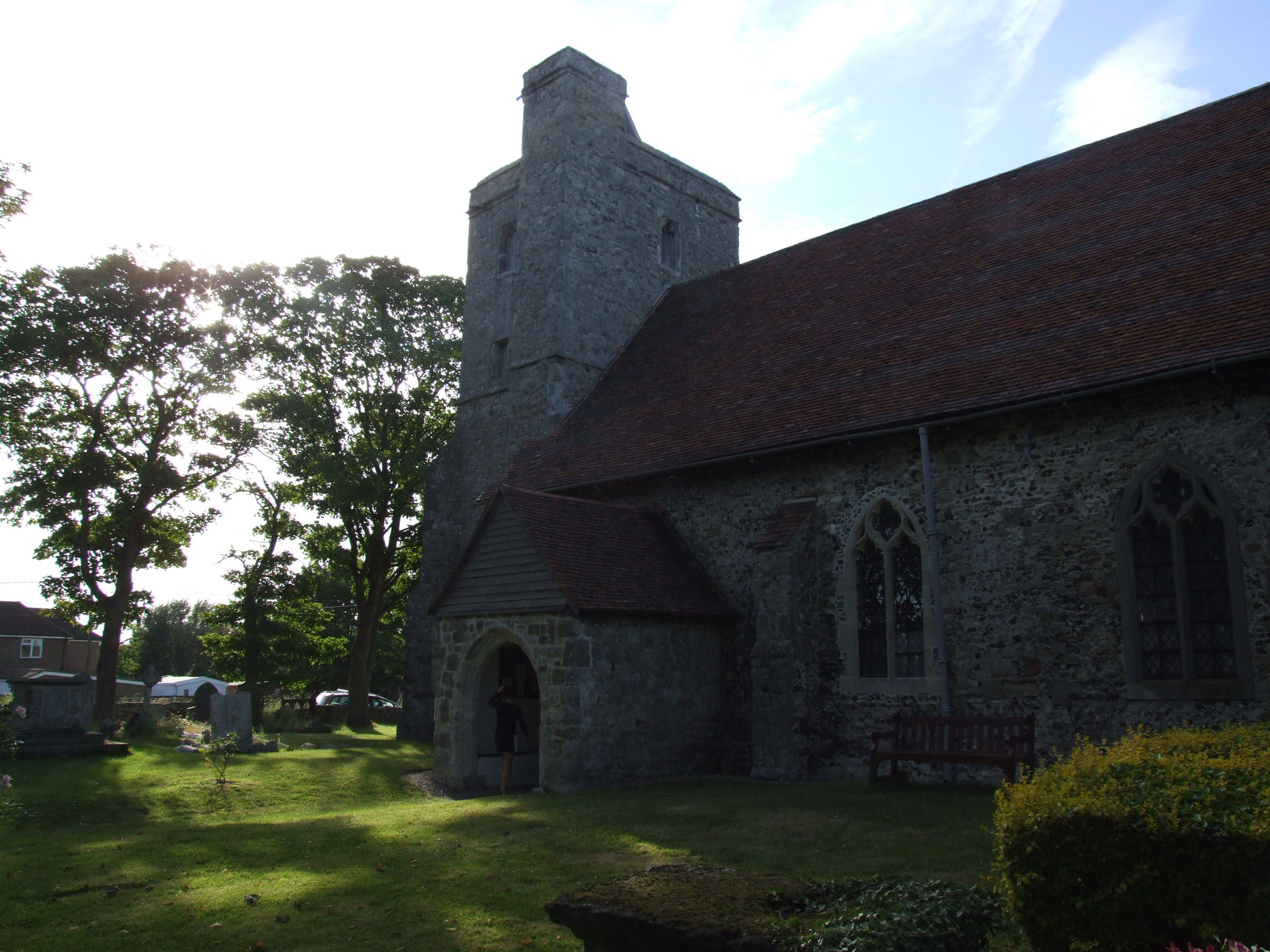
St James' Church, Cooling.

The parish church of St James dates from the late 13th century. Although it has long been classified 'redundant', and no longer used for regular worship, Jools Holland married Christabel (former Countess of Durham) there in August 2007. The church is maintained by the Churches Conservation Trust and is open to visitors daily. In the churchyard are a group of children's gravestones which are widely considered to have inspired Charles Dickens' description of the churchyard in the opening scene of the novel Great Expectations.
