= Libby Smith =

Libby Smith may refer to:

- Libby Smith (footballer) (born 2001), English footballer
- Libby Smith (Lost), a fictional character on TV series Lost

== See also ==
- Elizabeth Smith (disambiguation)
