= Tarbell Course in Magic =

Reference work for professional and amateur magicians

- Author: Harlan Tarbell
- Publisher: Louis Tannen; D. Robbins
- No. of books: 8

The Tarbell Course in Magic is a notable encyclopedia of magic amongst professional and amateur magicians. It has eight volumes; the first five were part of the original home-study correspondence course compiled in 1928 by Harlan Tarbell, the remaining three volumes being added on later.

This magic volume series was originally designed as a correspondence course for budding magicians. Once they were collected and bound, the series has become an unparalleled reference standard for magicians. In its impact on the magic world, it is second perhaps in its influence on the art of magic only to Hoffman's Modern Magic, and many professional magicians have based their careers on the Tarbell Course.

== Structure ==
The entire collection comprises more than one-hundred lessons in every aspect of magic including micromagic/close-up magic, escapology, mentalism and stage illusions. It is the most comprehensive literary work in magic history. The original five volumes contained sixty correspondence lessons with more than 3,000 illustrations.

In addition to teaching specific tricks, The Tarbell Course also teaches patter, marketing, the history of magic, ethics, advertising, routining, presentation, diction and elocution, magic theory, performance theory, acting, misdirection, timing and showmanship.

Volume 7 of the series was written by Harry Lorayne and compiled from contributions by other magicians; it is valued largely for its comprehensive index, subdivided by title, contributor, and properties, to the first seven volumes.

Volume 8 of the series was compiled and edited by Richard J. Kaufman and Steve Burton. It collected Tarbell's widely scattered and previously uncollected writings on magic, which Kaufman then fashioned into something resembling the first six volumes of the course. Since most of the book was written and illustrated by Tarbell, it is linked more closely to the rest of the course than Volume 7.

== History ==
Publishers T. Grant Cooke and Walter A. Jordan hoped to produce a correspondence course in magic in the mid-1920s and approached Harlan Tarbell and Walter Baker to work on the project. Baker abandoned the project early on to concentrate on his performances. Tarbell was thus dropped from the project.

Cooke and Jordan then approached Harry Houdini to create the course. Houdini declined due to lack of time but recommended Tarbell. Ultimately, the publishers agreed and offered Tarbell $50,000 for the course.

The series sold 10,000 copies until Cooke and Jordan discontinued it in 1931. In 1941, Louis Tannen purchased the rights to the course and reworked the correspondence lessons into book form and ultimately added three additional volumes.

D. Robbins and Co./ E-Z Magic purchased all rights from Tannens in 1962 and is the current publisher and distributor of the Tarbell Course in Magic. The Encyclopedia was also translated into the Korean and Japanese language.

The course was ultimately so successful that it became a textbook for magicians all over the world. A magician traveling in India offered to buy some of the secrets of a Hindu Fakir and was surprised to learn that they came from the Tarbell Course. In Africa, tribal medicine men asked that the volumes be sent in a plain brown wrapper to keep their followers from learning that their magic came from Chicago.

From 2016 onward, Penguin Magic adapted the Tarbell Course for online video, with each trick and technique taught in order by magician Dan Harlan. It is released monthly, lesson-by-lesson.

In 2023 Harrison Greenbaum published You are All Terrible. This book is designed as if it were volume 9 of the Tarbell course (Taribell Course in Magic). This book provides some satirical insights into the theory of magic performance.

== Lessons ==
=== Original Mail-Order Course Lessons ===
1. The History of Magic
2. The History of Sleight-of-Hand
3. Necromancy & Divination
4. Development of Superstitions
5. Magic & Religion
6. Magic & the Science of Medicine
7. The Rope & Tape Principle
8. The Relations of Magic to Other Sciences
9. The Principles of Card Effects
10. Confidence & Enthusiasm
11. The Penetrating Ring, The Jumping Rubber Band, Thumb Tie with Rubber Band, The Japanese Thumb Tie
12. Cards That Pass in the Night, The Cars up the Sleeve
13. The Regular Pass, The Card Stab, The Extremist-Ray Knife, The Magnetic Knife
14. The Force, Producing a Card from a Whole Orange, The Card & the Banana
15. Guide to Card Positions, Various Principles of Palming & Shifts, The Conjurer's Touch, A Mysterious Discovery, "Marvello," Cards, Envelope & Hat
16. "Tack It", New Era Version of card Through Handkerchief, Three Cards Through the Handkerchief, Rising Cards Through Handkerchief
17. "Snap It", Flash Card Production, Mystery of the Glass House
18. Rising Cards
19. The Enchanted Cards & Envelope, Bewitched Rising Cards & Envelope, Rising Cards from Book, A Book & a card, Rising Cards Through Hat, Rising Cards out of a Hat
20. How to Please Your Audience, Keeping up with the Times, Making an Impression, Maintain a Healthy Attitude Toward Magic, The Vanishing Wand, King Solomon's Marriage Bands, Arrangement of Programs
21. Sleight-of-Hand with Coins
22. The Homing Coins, Invisible Money Transit, The Coin in the Magical Envelopes
23. The Miser's Dream, The Coin, Envelope & Handkerchief, The Passé Coins & Glasses, The Passé Coins from Hand-to-Hand, the Phantom Coin
24. Humpty Dumpty Outdone, The Egg Bag
25. I am Saving You Money, Effects with Rabbits
26. Simplicity is the Key-Note of the Tarbell System of Magic, The Cut & Restored Ribbon, A card & Ribbon Mystery Ribbon, A Spirit Communication, A Wandering Ribbon
27. The Famous Needle Trick, A Thimble Act
28. Silks, The Egg, the Glass, & the Handkerchief, The Wandering Handkerchief, The Silk & the Flame, The Candle, the Silk, & the Paper Tube, The Educated Knot
29. Divisions of Modern Magic, Unlimited Opportunities in Magic, Specialization, Presentation, Creating of Effects, Experiments of Super Mentality, The Chess Knight's Tour, A Mind Reading Act, The Yogi's Prediction, The X-Ray Cards, Telepathic Pictures
30. Making Money with Magic, Wand from Pocketbook, Cigar from Pocketbook, Wand from Card Case, Silk Production from Hat, A Rabbit Traveling Bag, Deluxe Silk Production from Hat, Production of Rabbit from Silks, Chinese Box Vanish for Rabbit
31. A Modern Crystal Gazing Act, Rapid Mental Transference, A Good "One Man" Mind Reading Act, Distant Mental Communication, Blindfold Card Reading, A Mystic Discovery
32. Your Relation to Other Magicians, Ethics at a Magic Performance, Silk Handkerchief Magic, Mystic Knots, The Dissolving Single Knot, The Speedy Single Knot, The Fade-Away Double Knot, Quick Release Double Knot, Leg Tie & Release with Handkerchief, The Magical Bow Knot, Repeat Handkerchief Vanish, AN Eggs-traordinary Eggs-Plantation, A "Sucker" Handkerchief Vanish, A One-Man Handkerchief Vanish, The Sympathetic Silks, Elusive Silks
33. Cigarette Magic, The Burning Cigarette & Silk Handkerchief, The Phantom Cigarette, The Vanishing Cigarette, The Dollar Bill in the Cigarette, Catching Cigarettes in the Air, An Odd Cigarette Vanish, Cardini's Floating Cigarette, to Produce Lighted Cigarette from Box
34. Twelve Impromptu Effects with Cards
35. Sleight-of-Hand with Cards
36. More Card Magic, Production of Cards from the Mouth, Cascade Production from Boy's Nose, Easy Methods for Forcing Cards, The Circus Trick, False Counting, Four Ace Effects, Card Fountains
37. Oriental Magic, Chinese Color-Changing Coins, Chink-a-Chink, The Phantom Knot, The Mystic Knots, Chefalo's Knot, Mysterious Japanese Tie, The Chinese Burning Tapes, Hindu Cut & Restored Turban
38. Oriental Magic, Japan-O-Tie, The Mystic Smoke, The Chinese Sticks, The Climbing Balls, The Disappearing Grain, The Hindu Jar of Grain, The Productive Japanese Lantern
39. More Handkerchief Magic, The Handkerchief Ball, The Soup Plate & Handkerchiefs, Two Soup Plates & Handkerchiefs, The Twentieth Century Silks, Tarbell's Color Changing Handkerchief, Double Handkerchief Color Change, The Dyeing Handkerchiefs, The Birth of Old Glory
40. Character Analysis Related to Magic
41. Billiard Ball Manipulation
42. The "Clean Cut" Color Changing Handkerchief, The "Vice-Versa" Color Changing Handkerchiefs, Handkerchief to Billiard Ball, The Elusive Rainbow, Spot the Red, Watch the Lemon, The Magic Chocolates, Popping Corn in a Hat, Nursing Bottle from the Hat
43. Coat & Hat Productions, Comedy Egg Production, A Master Hat Production, Rabbit Productions, An Unexpected Rabbit Production, Rapid Production of Rabbit from Hat, Silks & the Rabbit, Rabbit Production from Paper Ribbon, Rabbit Production from Gentleman's Coat, A Chicken Produced from Gentleman's Coat, Production of Bottle of Milk or Liquor from Gentleman's Hip Pocket, Changing Rabbit to Box of Candy, Sausages from Boy's Coat
44. Chemical & Mechanical Magic, A Novel Transmission of Smoke, Wine & Water, The Wandering Glass & Bottle, A Magical Transformation, A Cooking Lesson, The Welsh Rarebit
45. Spiritualistic Magic, The Living & the Dead, Spirit Photography, The Psychic Paper, Spirit Slate Writing, A Parlor Séance
46. More Spiritualistic Magic, The Dark Séance at the Table, The Dark Circle, Gysel's Mysterious Lights, Dr. Bridge's Thought Projection, The Siberian Chain Escape, The Cabinet Séance, Another Good Tie, The Throw-Away Coat Tie
47. Chinese Linking Rings, Weber's Emergency Routine
48. More Oriental Magic, Tarbell's Mysterious Firecrackers, Kolar's Balloon & Silks, Ching-A-Ling Chinese Lantern Production, The Hindu Mango Tree Growth, Tarbell's Hindu Plant Growth, Comedy Flower Growth
49. Specialty Chinese Magic, Production of a Large Bowl of Water, Production of Stack of Four Bowls of Water, Chinese Production of the Four Bowls, Production of a Child, Modern Production of Bowl of Water on Table, Chinese Production of Doves, The Mysterious Self-Filling Lota, Ching Ling Foo's Magic Water Can, Mystery of the Paper Ball, Egg, Frog, & Baby Chicken
50. The Tarbell Rope Mystery
51. Illusions, The Mystery of King Tut, Who & Which
52. Building Illusions, Black Art Illusions, The Elusive Hindu, A Daughter of the Sun, The Mystery of the Girl in the Trunk, The Phantom Flight
53. Escape & Substitution Illusions, The Substitution Trunk Mystery, The Canvas Box Mystery, The Packing Box Escape, The Paper Bag Escape
54. The Black Art Table, The Treasure Chest, The Chinese Pigeon Production, Thayer's Super-Vanish of Doves
55. The Egyptian Mummy, The Mystery of the Dancing Girls, The Doll House Illusion
56. The Sword Box, The Penetrative Steel Bars, The Indestructible Girl, Sawing a Woman in Half
57. The Chinaman, The Ghost & the Cat, The Mystery of The Three Ghosts
58. The Phantom of the Circus
59. Making the Box Office Pay
60. Advertising & Publicity

=== Book Volumes ===
Volume 6

1. Novel Ball Magic
2. Unique Card Effects
3. Novelty Magic
4. Rope Magic
5. Mind Reading Mysteries
6. X-Ray Eyes and Blindfold Effects
7. Silk and Rope Penetrations
8. Escapes and Substitutions
9. Spirit Ties and Vest Turning
10. Modern Stage Magic
11. Stage Productions
12. Magic As Theatre

Volume 7

1. More Mental Magic
2. Card Magic
3. Rope Magic
4. Novelty Magic
5. Money Magic
6. Silk Magic
7. Illusions
8. Miscellaneous Late Arrivals

Volume 8 - (Tarbell's Graduate Course in Magic)

1. Thoughts and Advice
2. Further Unique Mysteries
3. Magic with Cards
4. Oriental Magic
5. Magic of the Mind
6. Rope Magic
7. Chalk Talk Magic
8. Magic with Apparatus
9. Comedy Magic
10. Pantomime Illusions
11. Making Magic Pay
12. Selling of the Tarbell System
