= Chatham Central railway station =

Disused railway station in Kent, England

Coordinates: 51°23′05.10″N 0°30′45.00″E

Chatham Central
- Site of Chatham Central railway station

General information
- Location: Chatham, Borough of Medway; England
- Platforms: 1

Other information
- Status: Disused

History
- Original company: South Eastern Railway
- Pre-grouping: South Eastern and Chatham Railway

Key dates
- 1 Mar 1892: Opened
- 1 Oct 1911: Closed
Location

Chatham Central was the terminus of the Chatham Extension from Strood serving the towns of Chatham and Rochester.

The station was opened by the South Eastern Railway which merged with the London, Chatham and Dover Railway to form the South Eastern and Chatham Railway in 1899. After the merger the SE & CR deemed that the Chatham Extension was an unnecessary duplication of the line and stations that it inherited from the LC & DR, and therefore the Extension and its stations, including Chatham Central, was closed in 1911.

Apart from the present railway bridge (part of Rochester Bridge), no trace of the station or the Chatham Extension is evident today. Houses on Doust Way have been built over the site of the station.

Preceding station	Disused railways	Following station
Rochester Common; Line and station closed	South Eastern Railway; Chatham Extension	Terminus
