= Chobham (disambiguation) =

Chobham is a village in Surrey, England.

Chobham may also refer to:

== Places ==
- Chobham Common, near Chobham, Surrey, location of a British tank research centre
- Chobham Academy, an academy in the East Village of Stratford, London
- Chobham Manor, a neighbourhood in Queen Elizabeth Olympic Park, London, built 2012–2013

== Other uses ==
- Chobham armour, composite armour for tanks
- Chobham F.C., a former English football club (1905–2011)

== See also ==
- Cobham (disambiguation)
