= Betty Smith (disambiguation) =

Betty Smith (1896–1972) was an American author. Betty Smith may also refer to:

- Betty Smith (musician) (1929–2011), English jazz saxophonist and singer
- Betty Ruth Smith (fl. 1920s–1940s), American actress best known for her work in old-time radio
- Betty Smith (American Dad!), fictional character

== See also ==
- Betty Smith Williams (fl. 1950s–1980s), American nurse
- Elizabeth Smith (disambiguation)
