= Battle of Barracas =

1828 naval battle between Argentina and Brazil

- Part of the Cisplatine War
Date	17 February 1828
Location	Río de la Plata, Argentina
Result	Brazilian victory

Belligerents
Empire of Brazil	(Argentina) United Provinces

Commanders and leaders
James Norton (WIA)	Nicolas George

Strength
2 brigs 6 schooners	6 schooners 6 gunboats

Casualties and losses
2 dead 10 wounded 2 captured	1 schooner damaged 1 gunboat destroyed

The Battle of Barracas was a minor naval battle between Argentine and Brazilian forces which took place close to Quilmes, in February 1828. The battle was a Brazilian victory, as the Argentine fleet was kept from rescuing the American blockade runner Sicily, which had been carrying vital supplies to Buenos Aires, and lost a gunboat.

== Background and engagement ==
On 17 February 1828, an American brig, the Sicily, which intended to run past the Brazilian blockade of the Río de la Plata, was spotted by the Argentines, and the Brazilian fleet. Pursued by three Brazilian ships, it got stuck in a sandbank near Quilmes, to the southeast of Buenos Aires. Given this, 6 schooners and 6 gunboats were dispatched from Buenos Aires to aid the blockade runner; in turn, they were attacked by a Brazilian force made up by 2 brigs and 6 schooners. The Brazilians, who had reached the brig first, were surprised by the arrival of the Argentines and left two officers aboard it; they were captured.

The exchange of fire between both fleets proved mostly uneventful, though the Brazilians suffered 12 casualties, including their commander, James Norton. The Argentines also had several wounded. When night fell, aware that the Sicily was definitely stuck, they opted to burn it to keep the Brazilians from capturing its supplies. Afterwards, as the Argentines withdrew, one of its gunboats, gunboat no. 11 under Luciano Castelli, was set upon by 9 Brazilian ships, forcing its crew to ditch it in a sandbank and abandon it. In the next morning, the Brazilians burned it and destroyed it, taking a gun with them.

The Argentine commanders were arrested after this defeat upon their arrival at Buenos Aires for the loss of both the Sicily and the gunboat.
