= Henry Cobham =

Henry Cobham may refer to:

- Henry de Cobham, 1st Baron Cobham (1260–1339), English peer
- Henry Cobham (diplomat) (1537–1592), English MP for Kent
- Henry Brooke, 11th Baron Cobham (1564–1618), English peer
