= James Norton (admiral) =

English naval officer (1789–1835)

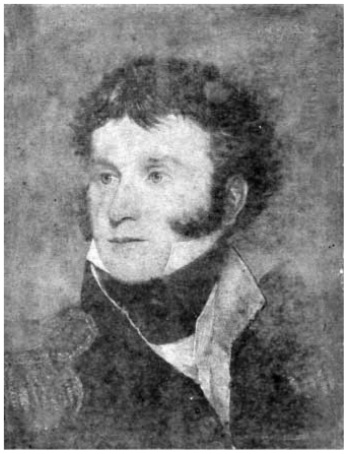
- Born: 9 June 1789; Newark-on-Trent, Nottinghamshire, England
- Died: 29 August 1835 (aged 46); On board a ship, off the coast of New Zealand
- Spouse: Eliza Bland Smith Erskine Norton (m. 1819)
- Children: Fletcher Carioca; Fredrick da Prata; Maria Brasilia
- Military career
- Allegiance: United Kingdom; Empire of Brazil
- Branch: Royal Navy; Imperial Brazilian Navy
- Rank: Rear Admiral
- Conflicts: Napoleonic Wars; Confederation of the Equator; Cisplatine War

James Norton (9 June 1789 – 29 August 1835) was an English naval officer who participated as a combatant and commander of the Imperial Brazilian Navy during the Cisplatine War.

== Biography ==
Norton was born in Newark-on-Trent on 9 June 1789 to Richard Norton, who belonged to the collateral branch of the family of Lord Grantley (Brinsley Norton), and Elisa Norton.

He joined the Royal Navy in 1802, taking part in the Napoleonic Wars under the command of Admiral Edward Pellew. With the independence of Brazil, the emperor Pedro I began the formation of a navy, hiring the services of Lord Thomas Cochrane, having sent Felisberto Caldeira Brant to Great Britain to recruit officers, among them James Norton.

In the Pernambuco campaign, in 1824, at the head of a corps of sailors, he seized Recife. In the Cisplatine War, he was sent to the Río de la Plata with the frigate Nichteroy under his command. Soon after he assumed and commanded the naval division blockading Buenos Aires, achieving several victories and distinguishing himself in many battles, particularly those of 30 July 1826, 8 April and 7 December 1827 and of June 16 1828. In the latter, he lost his right arm and, on 17 February that year, he was slightly wounded.

He successfully led the blockade of the Río de la Plata, which brought Argentine public finances to the brink of collapse, hastening the peace agreement that ended the war, despite Brazilian defeats on land. Norton then destroyed the best ships of the Argentine fleet: the frigate 25 de Mayo, the brigs Independencia, Republica, Congreso and General Brandzen. After the war, he was knighted in the Imperial Order of the Cross, and also received the Imperial Order of the Rose. On 17 October 1829, he was promoted to head of division, with the rank of Rear Admiral.

He died on 29 August 1835 on board a ship off the west coast of New Zealand travelling back to Brazil.

His widow, Eliza Bland, published in 1837 a small work, entitled A noiva do Brasil (The Brazilian Bride). The couple's enthusiasm for the new country, according to British historian Brian Vale, is revealed by some of the names given to their children: Fletcher Carioca, Fredrick da Prata and Maria Brasília.

== Bibliography ==
- Boiteux, Henrique (1920). Os Nossos Almirantes (in Portuguese). Vol. 3. Rio de Janeiro: Imprensa Naval. pp. 1–27.
- Garcia, Rodolfo (2012). Obras do Barão do Rio Branco VI: efemérides brasileiras (in Portuguese). Brasília: Fundação Alexandre de Gusmão. ISBN 978-85-7631-357-1.
