= Harlan Tarbell =

American stage magician and illustrator

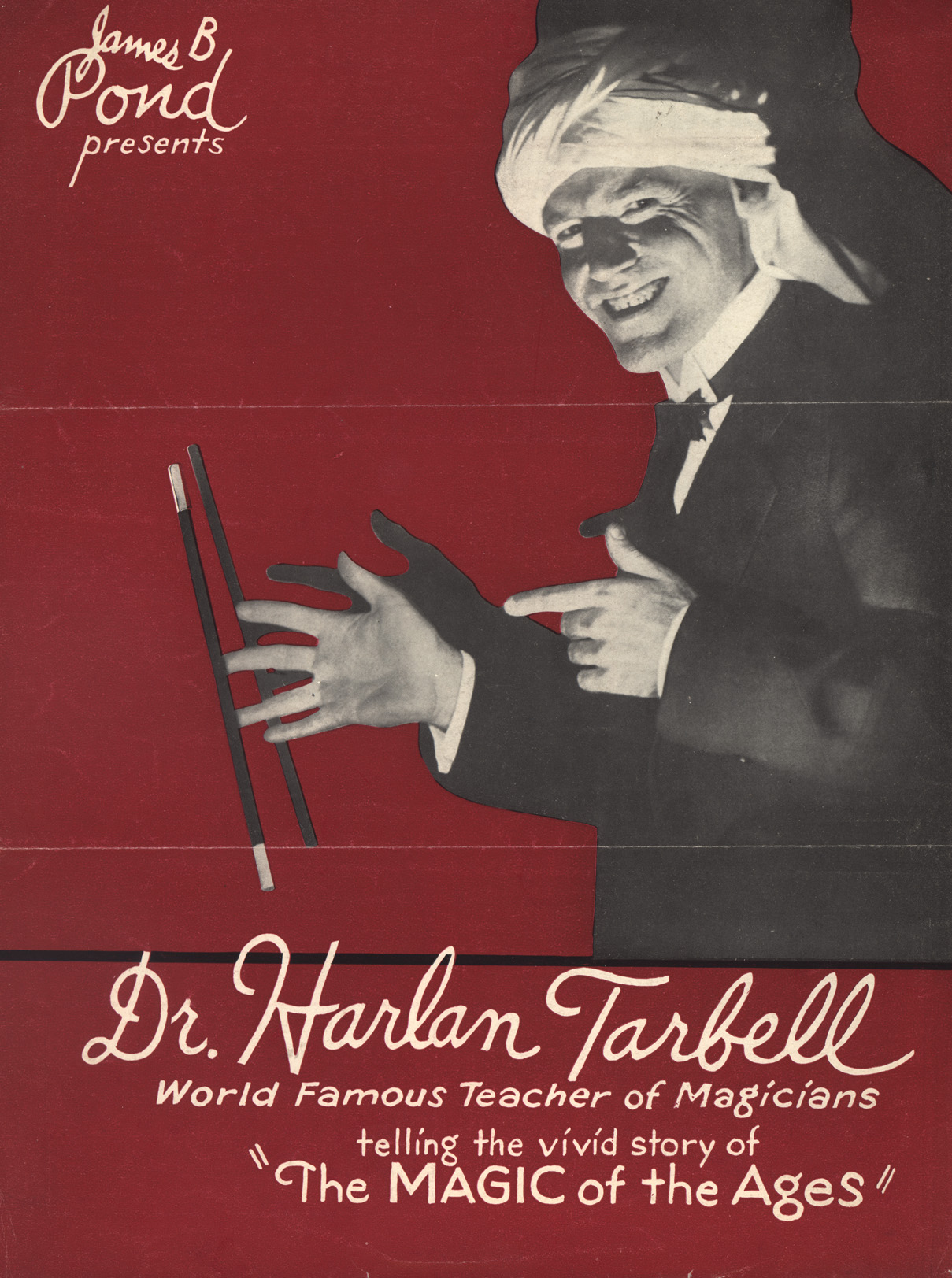
- Born: February 23, 1890; Delavan, Illinois, United States
- Died: June 16, 1960 (aged 70); Elmhurst, Illinois
- Notable work: Tarbell Course in Magic

Harlan Eugene Tarbell (February 23, 1890 – June 16, 1960) was an American stage magician and illustrator of the early 20th century. He was the author of the well-known Tarbell Course in Magic.

His only foray into cinema was an early 1930s film short entitled "Buck Rogers in the 25th Century". He directed the production and starred as Doctor Huer.

== Childhood and career in illustration ==
Tarbell was born on February 23, 1890, in the Illinois town of Delavan, but spent his childhood in Groveland. Tarbell created cartoons for a newspaper in Morton when he was 12 years old. It was at this time that Tarbell received one of his earliest introductions to professional magic, when he hiked five miles along the railroad tracks to watch magician Harry August Jansen, aka Dante, perform at the Morton Town Hall.

In 1911, Tarbell moved to Chicago in order to pursue a professional career in illustration. His efforts attracted the attention of the magic company Read and Covert, which hired Tarbell to work on their Illustrated Catalogue of Superior Magical Apparatus. Tarbell continued to produce illustrations for Read and Covert until 1941.

During World War I, Tarbell served with the 24th Air Company in France, working with the medical department. He found time during his service to illustrate a military atlas and study with French impressionist Claude Monet. Tarbell also wrote "Jonah", a song about the Biblical figure, published in 1922 by Eliza Doyle Smith.

== Tarbell Course in Magic ==
Publishers T. Grant Cooke and Walter A. Jordan developed an interest in producing a correspondence course in magic in the mid-1920s. A few months before his death, Harry Houdini was approached to author the course; Houdini declined but recommended Tarbell. Cook and Jordan hired Tarbell and Walter Baker, another Chicago-area magician, to work on the project, but Baker dropped out of the project in its early stages to concentrate on his performances. The publishers allotted Tarbell $50,000 for the course, which he finished in 1928, producing 60 correspondence lessons with at least 3,100 illustrations.

Tarbell later discussed the philosophy behind his course: "There is a big difference between a magician and a man who does tricks...Fundamentally, the making of a magician is no different than the making of other professional people. One must be trained in the mechanics, the alternate methods and be skilled in the presentation in order to meet any conditions which may arise." Unlike other magic courses which placed a greater emphasis on self-working illusions, Tarbell began with fundamental drills and practice sessions involving body position, movement, and sleight-of-hand techniques which were to be incorporated into actual tricks in future lessons.

After selling 10,000 complete courses, Cooke and Jordan discontinued marketing the Tarbell Course in Magic in 1931, blaming the Great Depression for slumping sales. In 1941, however, magician Louis Tannen purchased the rights to the course, working with Tarbell and Ralph W. Read (of Read and Covert) to convert the correspondence lessons into book form.

D. Robbins and Co./ E-Z Magic purchased all rights from Tannens in 1962 and is the current publisher and distributor of the Tarbell Course in Magic. The Encyclopedia was also translated into the Korean and Japanese languages.

== Later life ==
Tarbell lived in Elmhurst, Illinois, for the last 34 years of his life. He suffered a fatal cardiac arrest on June 16, 1960, dying at the age of 70.
