= Rochester Common railway station =

Disused railway station in Kent, England

Coordinates: 51°23′27″N 0°30′22″E

Rochester Common

General information
- Location: Rochester, Borough of Medway; England

Other information
- Status: Disused

History
- Original company: South Eastern Railway
- Pre-grouping: South Eastern and Chatham Railway

Key dates
- 20 Jul 1891: Opened as Rochester
- 1 Jul 1899: Renamed; Rochester Common
- Dec 1901: Renamed; Rochester Central
- 1 Oct 1911: Closed
Location

Rochester Common was a station on the Chatham Extension from Strood serving the town of Rochester.

The station was opened by the South Eastern Railway which merged with the London, Chatham and Dover Railway to form the South Eastern and Chatham Railway in 1899. After the merger the SE & CR deemed that the Chatham Extension was an unnecessary duplication of the line and stations that it inherited from the LC & DR, and therefore the Extension and its stations, including Rochester Central (as it was then named), was closed in 1911. The station was demolished soon after closure and the site of the station later became sidings for Rochester Freight Depot until c. 1990.. Since closure the whole area has been redeveloped erasing any trace of the railway.

The track layout was remodelled so that only the South Eastern Railway's bridge over the River Medway was used, and that layout is still there in the present day Chatham Main Line route.

The London, Chatham and Dover Railway's bridge lay unused and then derelict until it was rebuilt in the 1960s to be the eastbound carriageway for a widened A2 road bridge which opened in 1970.

Preceding station	Disused railways	Following station
Strood; Line closed, station open	South Eastern Railway; Chatham Extension	Chatham Central; Line and station closed
