= Liz Smith =

Liz Smith may refer to:

- Liz Smith (actress) (1921–2016), English character actress
- Liz Smith (journalist) (1923–2017), American gossip columnist
- Liz Smith (soccer) (born 1975), Canadian soccer player
- Liz Smith (politician) (born 1960), Scottish Conservative Party politician

== See also ==
- Elizabeth Smith (disambiguation)
