= Elizabeth Smith Middleton =

English-born Canadian temperance worker (1814 – 1898)

Elizabeth Smith Middleton (1814–1898) was an English-born Canadian temperance worker who served as Provincial President of the Quebec Woman's Christian Temperance Union (WCTU). In recognition of her services, a hall, which bears her name, was erected to her memory as well as a drinking-fountain, with a suitable inscription, near the Saint-Louis Gate of Quebec City.

== Early life and education ==
Elizabeth Smith born in Yorkshire, England, May 10, 1814. While still a child, she emigrated with her parents to Canada, the family residence being established at Trois-Rivières, in the province of Quebec, where she received a liberal education.

== Career ==
In 1882, a woman's auxiliary to the Temperance Union of Quebec was formed, of which Middleton was chosen president. In the following year. she became president of the newly formed Quebec City WCTU. During the same year, the awakening temperance sentiment throughout Quebec resulted in the organization of the provincial WCTU with Middleton as president. She traveled at large among the various municipalities of the province, lecturing and organizing year after year until 1888, when she declined reelection on account of failing health. She was then made honorary president, which position she continued to bold for the rest of her life. Middleton was also honored with a life membership in the World's WCTU.

== Personal life ==
On February 20, 1856, in Melbourne, Lower Canada she married Robert Middleton, of Berwick-upon-Tweed, editor of the Quebec Gazette, who was a widower with several children. Robert and Elizabeth had no children.

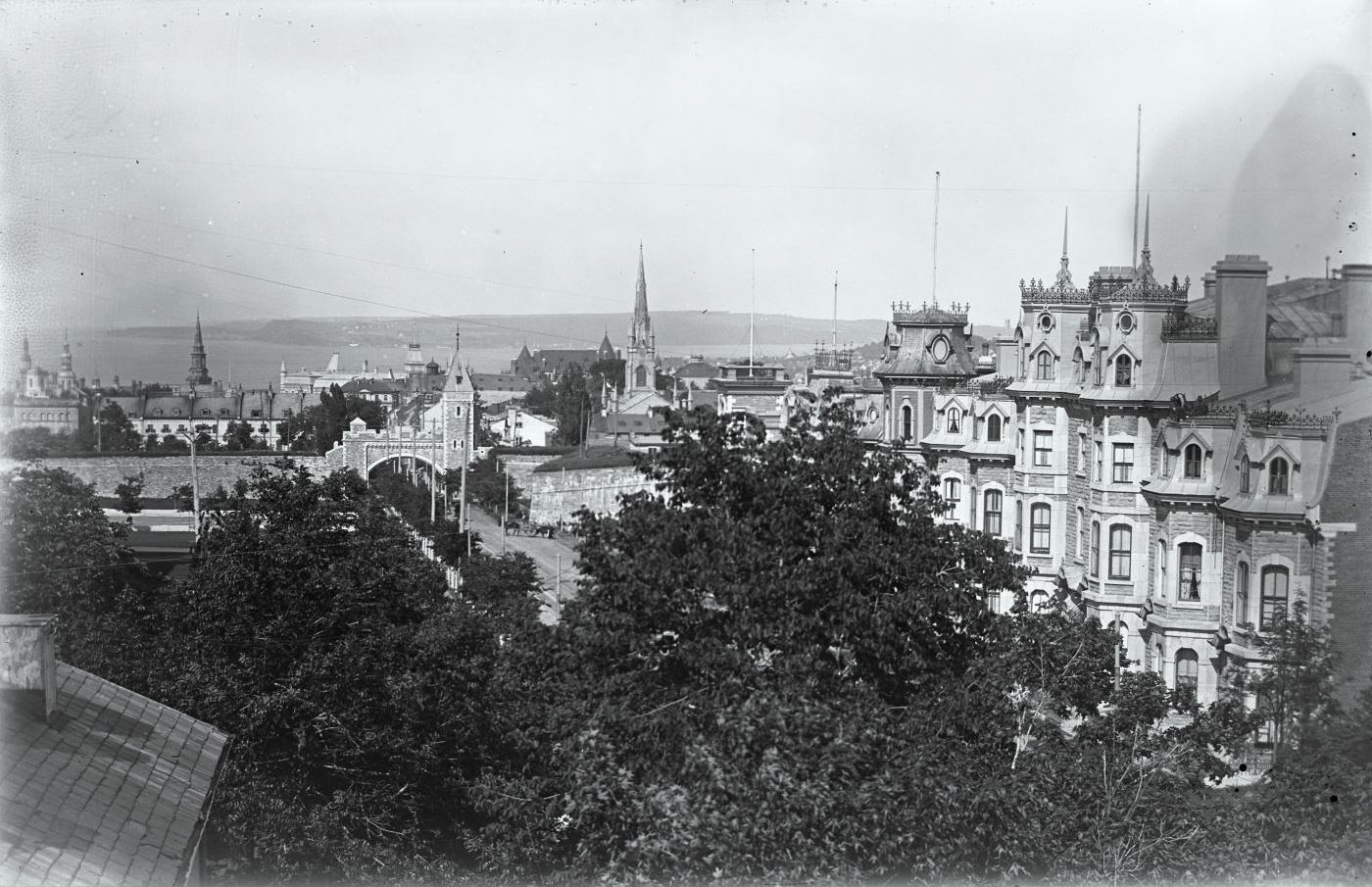
Saint-Louis Gate (center-left), 1898

Elizabeth Smith Middleton died in the U.S. at Old Orchard Beach, Maine, August 4, 1898. In recognition of her valuable services, a hall and a drinking-fountain were erected in her memory in Quebec City.
