= Eliza Bland Smith Erskine Norton =

British poet, playwright, and author

- Born: 1795; Whitehaven
- Died: 20 September 1855
- Spouse(s): Esmé Stuart Erskine, James Norton

Eliza Bland Smith Erskine Norton (1795 – 20 September 1855) was a British poet, playwright, and author.

== Life ==
Eliza Bland Smith was born in 1795 in Whitehaven, England, the daughter of a Lieutenant Colonel Smith. In 1809, she married Lt. Col. Esmé Stewart Erskine, son of Thomas Erskine, 1st Baron Erskine. He lost an arm at the Battle of Waterloo in 1815 and died in 1817. In Mumbai on 3 November 1819, she married James Norton, then in the naval service of the East India Company. He later joined the Imperial Brazilian Navy and during the Cisplatine War, he lost an arm in battle in 1828. He died in 1835.

Eliza Bland Smith Erskine Norton died on 20 September 1855 in Baden-Baden at the home of her son-in-law, diplomat Frederic Douglas-Hamilton.

== Writing ==
She published two books of poetry, Isabel (1814) and Alcon Malanzore (1815). The latter was a long narrative poem about the doomed interracial love between a Christian woman, Rosaline, and the titular Moorish commander. She also published a play, The Martyr (1848), which is set in the reign of Henry V and reimagines John Oldcastle as the heroic Lord Cobham, who is engaged to Matilda Vernon rather than married to Joan Oldcastle (née Cobham), whom Norton writes out of history. Norton would go on to publish a collection of stories, The Gossip (1852). She contributed to periodicals including The Metropolitan and Bentley's Miscellaney.

Her works are sometimes confused with those of the more famous author Caroline Norton; the latter quipped that "Mrs. Erskine Norton has ingeniously taken to playing at being me to all the publishers." The two women engaged in a debate about this confusion and the appropriate use of British naming conventions in letters to The Times.

== Children ==
Eliza and Esmé Stewart Erskine had three children:

- Thomas Erskine (born 29 March 1810)
- Esmé Stuart Erskine (8 Sep 1811-1833)
- Henry Erskine (born 11 August 1814)

Eliza and James Norton had six children:

- Marina Norton (1843-1871), who married diplomat Frederic Douglas-Hamilton (1815-1887)
- Indiana Isabel Norton (died in childhood)
- Fletcher Carioca Norton
- Fredrick de la Plata Norton
- William Slayter Norton
- Maria Brasilia Norton, who married Dr. John Brewor.

== Bibliography ==
- Isabel, a Tale, in Two Cantos; and Other Poems (1814)
- Alcon Malanzore: A Moorish Tale (1815)
- The Martyr: A Tragedy (1848)
- The Gossip: A Collection of Tales. 3 vol. London: Saunders and Otley, 1852.
