= Henry de Cobham, 1st Baron Cobham =

English peer

Arms of Cobham of Cobham and Cooling, both in Kent, Barons Cobham "of Kent": Gules, on a chevron or three lions rampant sable

Henry de Cobham, 1st Baron Cobham (c. 1260 – 25 August 1339) lord of the manor of Cobham, Kent and of Cooling, also in Kent, was an English peer.

== Origins ==
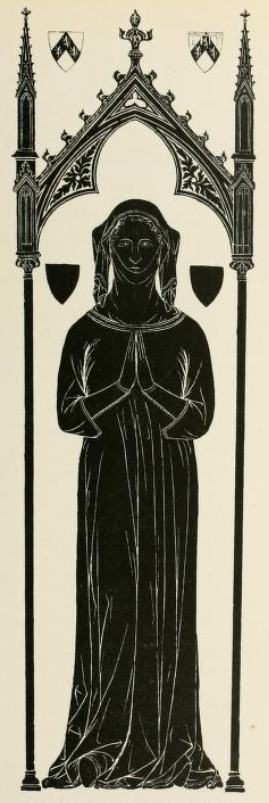
Monumental brass in Cobham Church of Joan Septvans (d. 1298), wife of John de Cobham (d. 1300) and mother of Henry de Cobham, 1st Baron Cobham

He was the son and heir of John de Cobham (d. 1300), of Cobham and of Cooling, Sheriff of Kent, Constable of Rochester Castle in Kent and one of the Barons of the Exchequer, by his wife Joan de Septvans (d. 1298), whose monumental brass survives in Cobham Church, a daughter and co-heiress of Sir Robert de Septvans of Chartham in Kent.

His uncle was Sir Henry de Cobham (d. c. 1316), of Rundale, Kent, Lord Warden of the Cinque Ports, who by his wife Joan Pencester (bef. 1269 – 1314/15) (a daughter of Stephen de Pencester), was the father of Stephen de Cobham, 1st Baron Cobham "of Rundale" and of John de Cobham (d. c. 1314), the latter who died childless.

The Cobham coat of arms was: Gules, on a chevron or three lions rampant sable, as visible on the top two shields on the brass in Cobham Church of Joan Septvans (d.1298), wife of John de Cobham (d. 1300) and mother of Henry de Cobham, 1st Baron Cobham.

=== Brass of mother ===
A monumental brass, laid down in 1320, survives in St Mary Magdalene's Church, Cobham, of Joan Septvans (d. 1298), wife of John de Cobham (d. 1300) and mother of Henry de Cobham, 1st Baron Cobham. It displays one of the earliest-known specimens of a Gothic canopy. The inscription, in Longobardic letters and Leonine verse is as follows:

Dame Jone de Kobeham gist isi,
Deus de sa alme eit merci.
Ki ke pur le alme priera,
Quaraunte jours de pardoun auera.

("Dame Jone de Cobham lies here, may God have mercy on her soul. Whosoever shall pray for her soul shall have forty days of pardon"). Concerning the famous Cobham brasses, William Belcher, in his Kentish Brasses (1905), stated: "Kent is peculiarly rich in Brasses. It has, perhaps, a larger number and a more representative collection than any other county, although individually finer examples may be found elsewhere. No church in the world possesses such a splendid series as the nineteen brasses in Cobham Church, ranging in date between 1298 and 1529". Thirteen of the brasses belong to the years 1320–1529 and commemorate members of the Cobham family and of the Brooke family, their heirs.

== Career ==
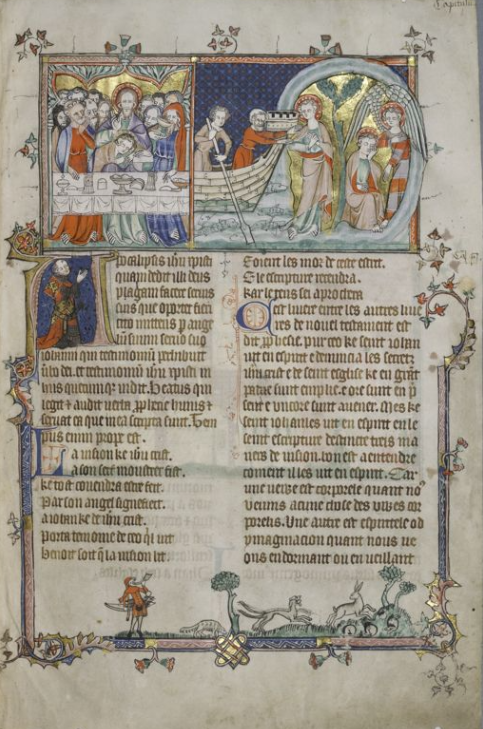
Illustration from Henry de Cobham's Apocalypse which was created in the 1330s

He was made Constable of Rochester Castle for life in 1303/4, of Dover Castle, of Tonbridge Castle in 1324 and of Canterbury, all in Kent. He was Lord Warden of the Cinque Ports in 1307 and between 1315 and 1320 and he served thrice as Sheriff of Kent (1300–1301, 1307 and 1315).

On 8 January 1312/13 he was created Baron Cobham "of Kent" (to distinguish his title from that of his first cousin Baron Cobham "of Rundale") by writ. He presided at the arraignment of Bartholomew de Badlesmere, 1st Baron Badlesmere for treason at Canterbury in 1322.

== Marriage and issue ==
At sometime before July 1285, he married Maud de Moreville, widow of Matthew de Columbers (d. pre-1284) (whom she had married before 1284), and a daughter of Eudes de Moreville. By his wife he had issue including:

- John de Cobham, 2nd Baron Cobham (d. 1355), son and heir.

== Death and burial ==
He died at Hatch Beauchamp in Somerset, the seat of the Beauchamp family's feudal barony of Hatch Beauchamp, and was buried in the Beauchamp Chapel at Stoke-sub-Hamdon, Somerset. He left a highly illustrated book called Apocalypse to Juliana Leybourne.

Political offices
Preceded by The Lord Burghersh	Lord Wardens of the Cinque Ports; 1307	Succeeded by Robert de Kendall
Preceded by Robert de Kendall	Lord Wardens of the Cinque Ports; 1315–1320	Succeeded by The Lord Badlesmere
Peerage of England
Preceded by New creation	Baron Cobham; 1312/1313–1339	Succeeded by John de Cobham
