= Rochester Bridge =

Bridge in Rochester, Kent, England

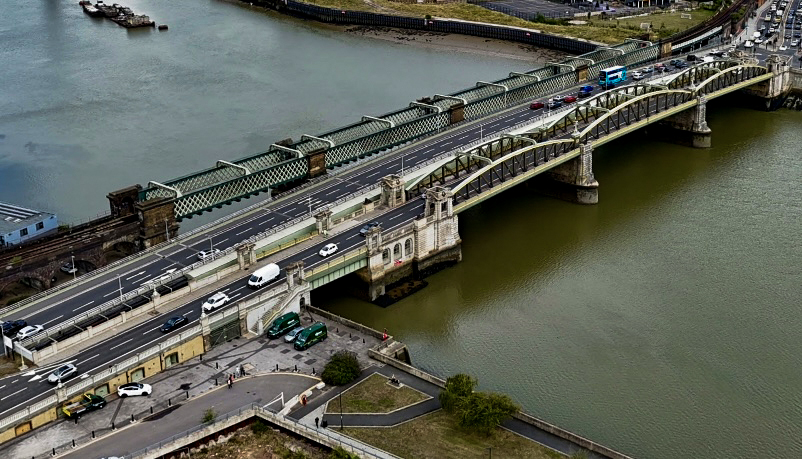
- Rochester Bridge over the River Medway linking Strood and Rochester. Left to right: the railway bridge; the new bridge; and the old bridge. The service bridge is hidden behind the old bridge.
- Coordinates: 51°23′32″N 0°30′03″E
- Carries: A2 road (two road bridges), Chatham Main Line railway, service pipes and cables
- Crosses: River Medway
- Locale: Strood and Rochester, Kent, England
- Owner: Rochester Bridge Trust (road and service bridges); Network Rail (railway bridge)

Characteristics
- Material: Cast iron, steel, concrete
- Total length: About 150 m (road bridges); about 185 m (railway bridge)
- No. of lanes: 4 (road)

History
- Constructed by: William Cubitt (road bridge, 1856); Joseph Cubitt (railway bridge, 1858)
- Opened: 1856 (Old Bridge), 29 March 1858 (Railway Bridge), 15 April 1970 (New and Service Bridges)

Statistics
- Toll: None

Location
- Interactive map of Rochester Bridge

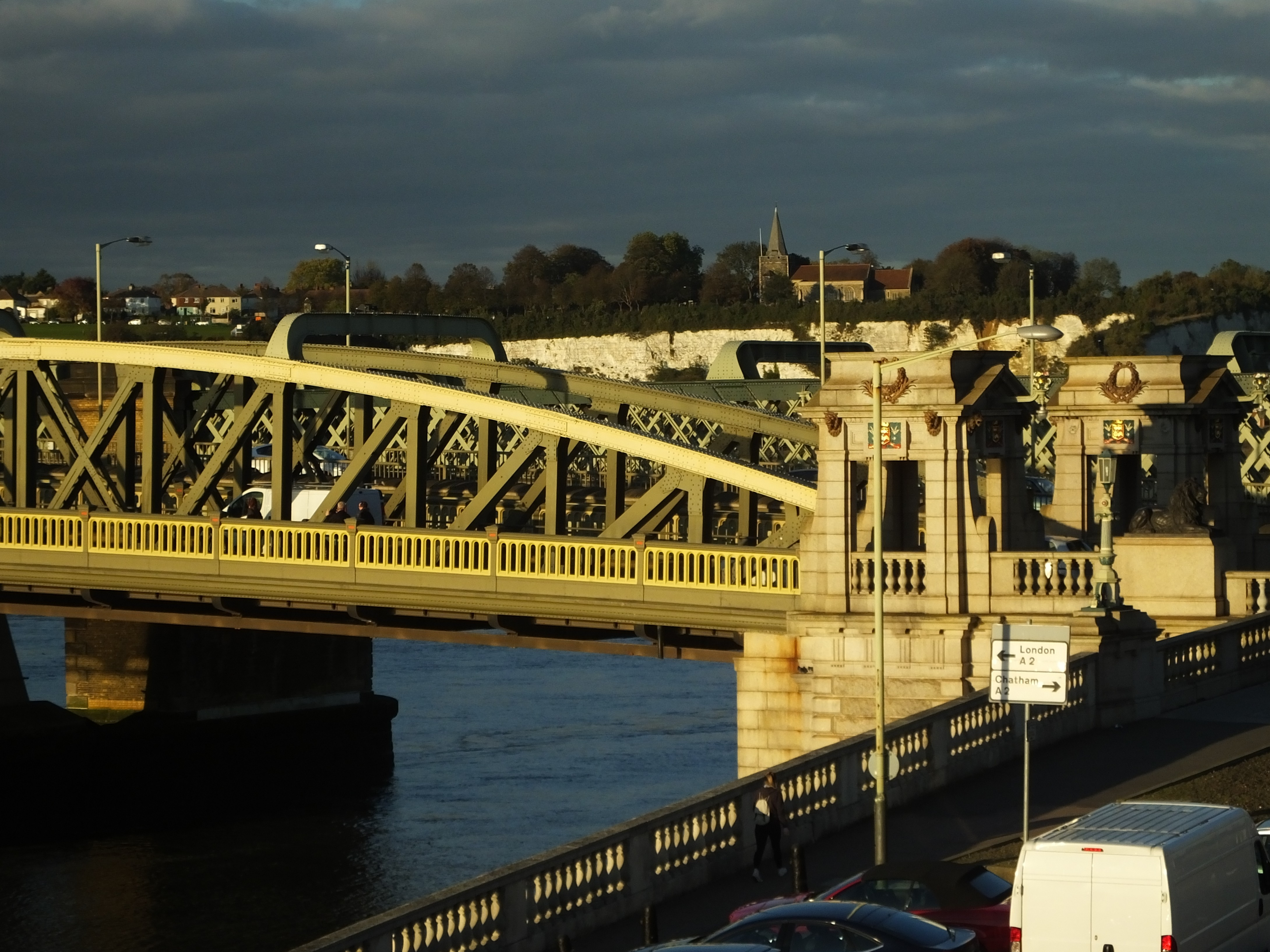
Rochester Bridge from the south east

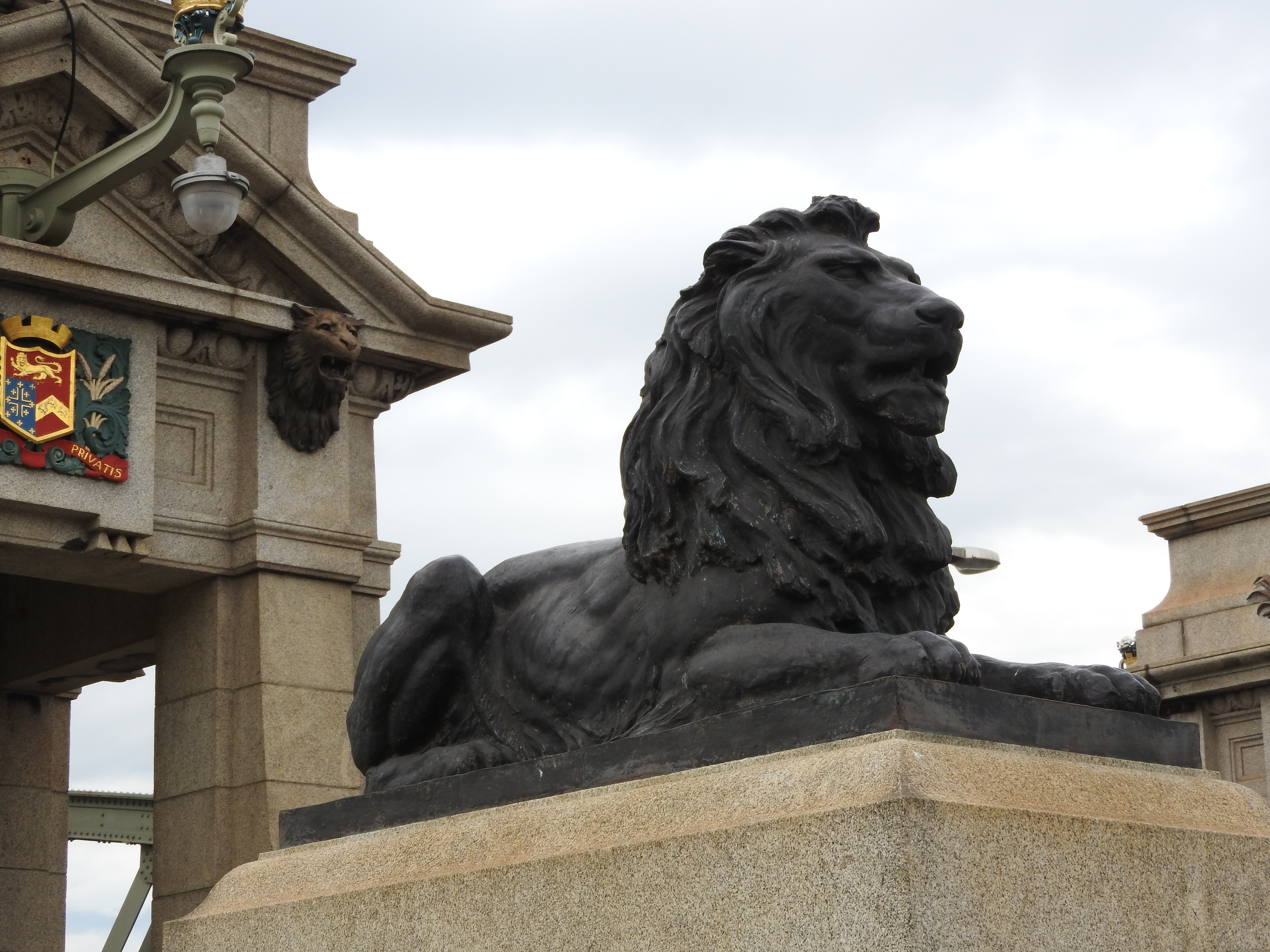
Two lion statues guard each end of the Old Bridge

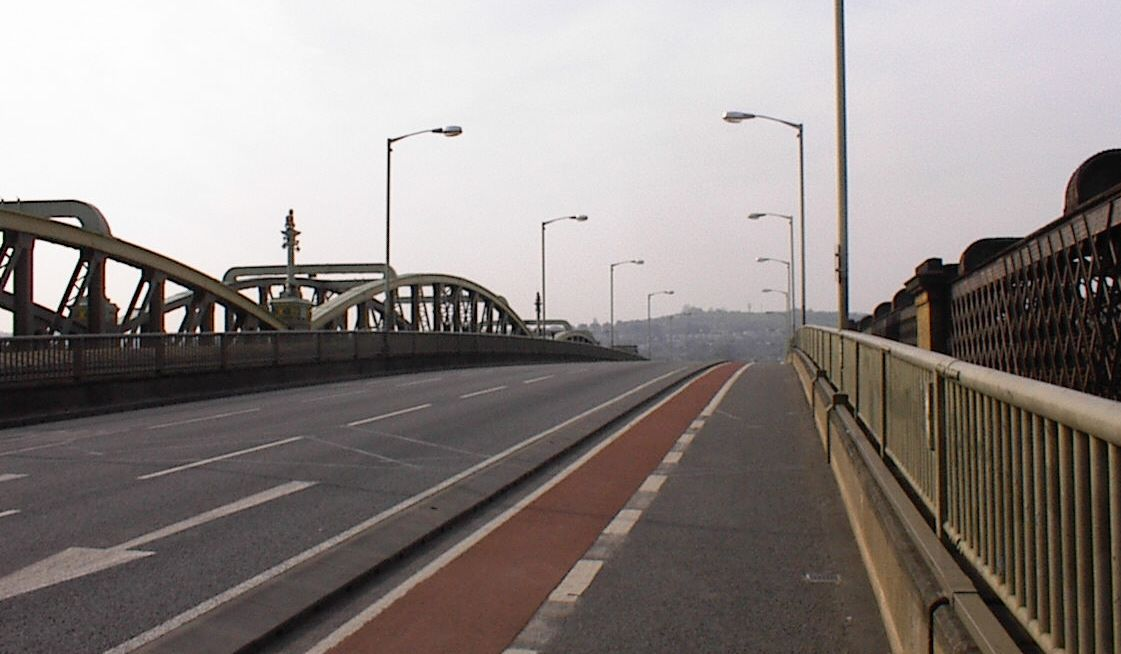
The 1970 Rochester Bridge forms the east-bound lanes of the A2 across the River Medway

Rochester Bridge is a bridge over the River Medway in Rochester, Kent, England. For centuries, it was the lowest fixed crossing of the river in South East England. There have been several generations of bridge at this spot, and the current "bridge" is in fact four separate bridges: the Old Bridge and New Bridge carrying the A2 road, Railway Bridge carrying the railway and the Service Bridge carrying service pipes and cables. The bridge links the towns of Strood and Rochester in Medway. All except the railway bridge are owned and maintained by the Rochester Bridge Trust.

== History ==
=== Roman ===
The Romans built a bridge across the River Medway as part of Watling Street, carrying traffic from London to Dover (the port for Continental Europe). This was almost certainly the first bridge at the site, and probably the earliest major bridge built in Britain by the Roman army, as the Romans were the first occupiers to have the necessary technology to bridge such a wide and fierce tidal river. The Roman engineers might have initially built a pontoon bridge to support and supply their invading armies; however this would have needed replacing by a stronger, more permanent bridge to support increased traffic. Victorian engineers discovered the Roman foundations when they were building the current Old Bridge; they found that stone foundations had been used, probably to support a wooden deck.

=== Middle Ages ===
The piers of the Roman bridge survived well into the Middle Ages, supporting a timber deck with three beams of cross-planking. In 1264, Simon de Montfort besieged the gate house and set fire to the bridge as part of his successful attempt to take Rochester. In the latter part of the 14th century the bridge consisted of nine stone piers supporting a wooden superstructure. Administratively the responsibility for bridge was divided amongst local landowners and institutions. This worked reasonably well, though sometimes those liable refused to co-operate and had goods seized. In 1311 for instance the King's bailiff, William Mot, seized a horse and five cows from the tenants of Westerham, however Richard Trewe and Hamon le Brun "rescued" the animals back and Richard "beat the said William". Despite partial rebuilding, the bridge fell into disrepair and collapses occurred with the worrying frequency of about once a year. In 1339 the bridge was down for 24 weeks, then the first and third piers were found to be decayed (repairs estimated at £19 and £8 6s 8d). In 1361 the bridge was in a dangerous state for 3 weeks and a boat had to be hired as a ferry. In the winter of 1380–81 a large proportion of the bridge was carried away by the combined forces of meltwater and ice. In 1382, the bridge being impassible" a commission was appointed to enquire as to those responsible for its maintenance. The commission included John de Cobham who as supervisor of repairs ensured the bridge was passable by the following year.

=== 1391–1856 ===
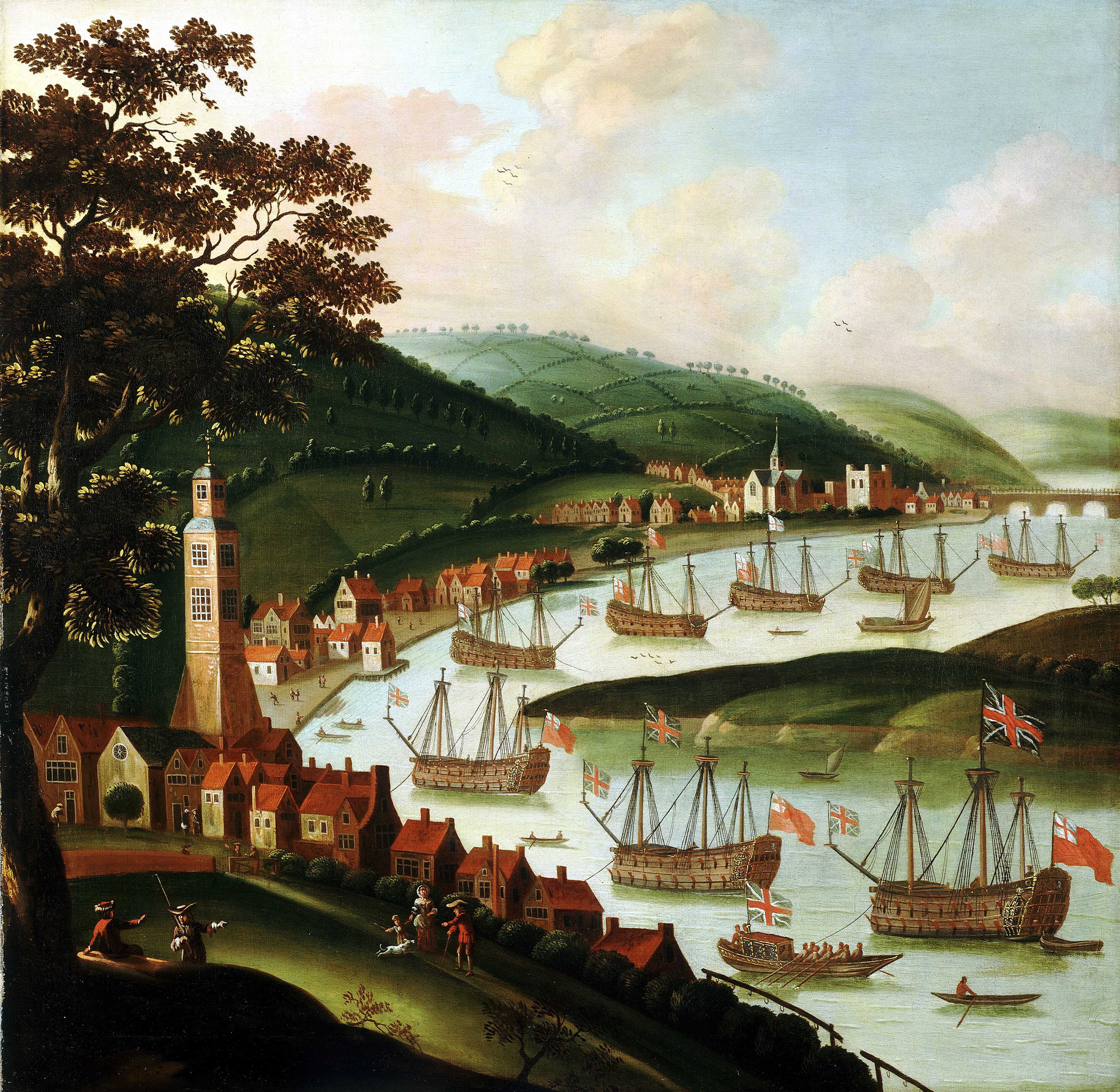
Ships laid up in the Medway, downstream of the old bridge at right, circa 1675

Rochester Bridge Act 1421
- Act of Parliament
- Parliament of England
- Long title: Writs purchases by the wardens of Rochester bridge, or against them, shall be good, though some of them die or be removed.
- Citation: 9 Hen. 5 Stat. 1. c. 12
- Territorial extent: England and Wales; Ireland

Dates
- Royal assent: 1421
- Commencement: 1 December 1421 (Note: Start of session.)
- Repealed: 1 August 1908
Other legislation
Repealed by	Rochester Bridge Act 1908
Relates to	Rochester Bridge Act 1575

Status: Repealed

Text of statute as originally enacted

The building of a stone bridge was organised and funded by Sir John de Cobham and Sir Robert Knolles (or Knollys), finished in 1391. It was located about 100 yards upstream of the Roman bridge and had 11 arches and a total length of 570 feet (170 m) It was 14 feet (4.3 m) wide. To ensure the maintenance of their new bridge, the two men instituted the Wardens and Commonalty of Rochester Bridge. The two elected wardens were appointed under letters patent from Richard II to own land and use the income for the bridge. The Wardens and Commonalty received grants of land from Henry IV and Henry V, as well as money from other benefactors, including Richard Whittington. The trust was able to maintain the bridge using income from property and investments, and materials from its own woods and quarries. A scheme of improvements were carried out from 1792 to widen the roadway of the bridge, to the plans of the engineer Daniel Asher Alexander. The two central arches merged into one in 1824 to provide a wider channel for shipping, under the supervision first of John Rennie the Elder, and completed by Thomas Telford. In 1856, when modern river traffic demanded a new structure the medieval bridge was demolished with the help of the Royal Engineers.

=== 1857–1914 ===
Rochester Bridge Act 1846
- Act of Parliament
- Parliament of the United Kingdom
- Long title: An Act for building a Bridge across the River Medway at Rochester in the County of Kent, with Approaches thereto; for taking down the present Bridge; and for amending the Acts relating to the same.
- Citation: 9 & 10 Vict. c. vi
- Territorial extent: United Kingdom

Dates
- Royal assent: 14 May 1846
Other legislation
Amended by	Rochester Bridge Amendment Act 1853; Rochester Bridge Act 1908
Repealed by	Charities (The Rochester Bridge Trust) Order 2000

Status: Repealed

Rochester Bridge Amendment Act 1853
- Act of Parliament
- Parliament of the United Kingdom
- Long title: An Act for extending the Time granted by "The Rochester Bridge Act, 1846," for the Completion of such Bridge.
- Citation: 16 & 17 Vict. c. xcv
- Territorial extent: United Kingdom

Dates
- Royal assent: 8 July 1853
Other legislation
Amends	Rochester Bridge Act 1846
Amended by	Rochester Bridge Act 1908
Repealed by	Charities (The Rochester Bridge Trust) Order 2000

Status: Repealed

Text of statute as originally enacted

Sir William Cubitt's cast iron bridge was built in 1856 to replace the stone bridge. This bridge was built downstream of the stone bridge, on the alignment of the current bridge and where the Romans had built theirs. It comprised three cast iron arches and a swing bridge span designed to swing open to allow river traffic, but the mechanism was never used and was eventually removed. The cast iron arches were below the road deck, making the bridge relatively low and meant that passing traffic at high tide had to navigate to line up with the top of the arch or risk striking the bridge.

Not every ship was successful and many collisions occurred. These took their toll on the bridge and an inspection in 1909 showed fractured ribs and missing bolts. After a relatively short life a new bridge was needed.

From around 1908 to 1932 the bridge also carried the tracks for the local tram system linking Strood and Frindsbury with Rochester, Chatham, Gillingham and Rainham.

=== 1914 to present day ===
Charities (The Rochester Bridge Trust) Order 2000
- Statutory Instrument
- Parliament of the United Kingdom
- Citation: SI 2000/3098

Dates
- Made: 16 November 2000
- Commencement: 30 November 2000
Other legislation
Made under	Charities Act 1993

[Rochester Bridge Text of statute as originally enacted]

The cast iron arched bridge was partly reconstructed with bowstring-shaped trusses above the deck at a cost of £95,887. During these works the bridge remained open for traffic. The reconstructed bridge was formally opened on 14 May 1914, by Lady Darnley.

In 1970 a second road bridge, the New Bridge, was opened immediately next to the first, to increase capacity. It was opened on 15 April 1970, by Princess Margaret. At the same time, the Service Bridge was built between the Old Bridge and the New Bridge, to carry gas, electrical, water, sewage and communication services.

All three bridges underwent major maintenance and complete refurbishment, completed in December 2021. As for all the work to the bridges, this was paid for by the Rochester Bridge Trust with the proceeds from the original endowments and was carried out at no cost to the public taxpayer or bridge users.

National Cycle Route 1 passes over the road bridges.

== Constructional methods ==
There are four extant bridges, and also the Roman bridge, and the Mediaeval bridge that was built 40m upstream, and the first railway bridge.

=== Roman bridge ===
The Roman Bridge was built circa AD 43 on the instructions of the Emperor Claudius. The flat bridge deck was supported on nine stone piers set on iron tipped oak timbers driven deep into the riverbed. To achieve this, a coffer-dam of two concentric circles of shallow piling was constructed around the site of each pier. The space between the two circles was then packed with clay to make the coffer-dam waterproof, and the water inside was pumped out to create a dry working area on the riverbed. The main oak piling was then driven deep into the chalk bedrock. The piers were built within a timber framework; they were stone faced and packed with ragstone rubble. Across the piers three oak beams were placed and planks laid over that to form the road-deck.

=== Medieval bridge ===
This was a stone bridge of eleven arches. It was built by Henry Yevele between August 1387 September 1391. The bridge over the tidal River Medway was 560 feet (170 m) long and 14 feet (4.3 m) wide. The piers were built on protective platforms called starlings, each about 40 feet (12 m) wide and 90 feet (27 m) long with cutwaters or pointed ends upstream and downstream to deflect the current. They were constructed from 10,000 piles that were connected by joists. The wooden structure was packed with chalk (the local stone) and then decked in elm planking. On these platforms were constructed 12 stone piers at irregular distances apart. There were connected by a drawbridge in bay 5, and gothic style stone arches for the other ten. Above these was the bridge deck with parapets. This was paved in Kentish ragstone.

=== Victorian bridge ===
The Wardens and Assistants of Rochester Bridge considered three proposals when the Medieval bridge needed to be replaced: a stone bridge, a suspension bridge and the cast iron bridge that was eventually built. The navy required a passage so masted vessels could proceed up stream.

The new bridge was 40 feet (12 m) wide with a combined span of 485 feet (148 m) over the three arches. The outside arches were each 140 feet (43 m), and the central arch was 170 feet (52 m) long with 18 feet (5.5 m) feet of headroom at high water. It appeared delicate, but the cast iron structure weighed over 2,500 metric tons (2,500 long tons). It rested on foundations of cast iron cylinders sunk through the riverbed into the bedrock, using an innovative method of pneumatic caissons.

On the Strood side of the bridge was the Ship's Passage: a channel 40 feet (12 m) in width. It was spanned by a swing bridge consisting of six wrought iron girders turning on a cast iron roller path, 30 feet (9.1 m) in diameter with 30 cast iron rollers. The centre wrought iron screw was 11 inches (28 cm) in diameter. The swing bridge was delicately balanced. The total weight of the swing bridge and roadway was over 300 tonnes, it could have been rotated with ease 90 degrees upriver.

=== First railway bridge ===
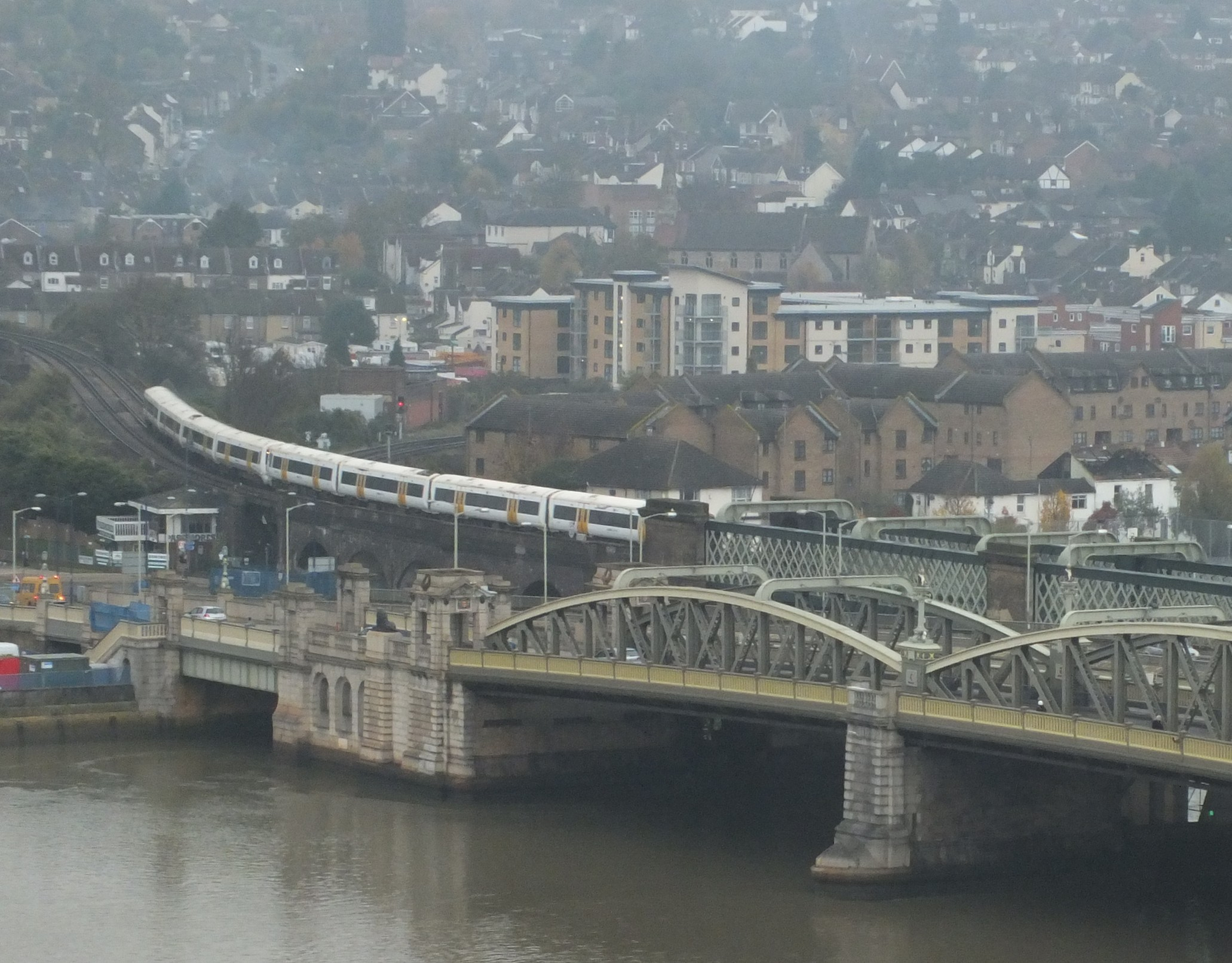
A Chatham Main Line train approaches the (second) bridge

The East Kent Railway built the first rail bridge (which opened on 29 March 1858) for its line from Strood to Chatham. It was designed and built by Joseph Cubitt, and had four spans, one of which could be opened to allow masted ships through, although this was later found to be unnecessary and so was fixed shut. The bridge was built of iron girders supported on masonry piers, 600 feet in length and weighing 700 tons. The East Kent Railway became the London Chatham and Dover Railway 1 August 1859 and in 1861 the bridge became a part of the newly completed Chatham Main Line from London to Dover.

=== Second railway bridge ===
The South Eastern Railway, the LCDR's local rival, built a branch line from its nearby railway line at Strood across the Medway to its own Rochester station, Rochester Common, opened on 20 July 1891, and its own Chatham station, Chatham Central, opened 1 March 1892, for which it built the massive second railway bridge over the Medway.

The two rivals merged under a Joint Managing Committee in 1899 to form the South Eastern and Chatham Railway, and subsequent rationalisation saw the SER's Chatham Central branch closed on 1 October 1911, three years before World War I. In 1927 the Chatham Mainline was diverted to use the more substantial second railway bridge, and the original LCDR railway bridge was left unused for decades. The foundations of the bridge were eventually repurposed for the second road bridge which opened in 1970.

== The Rochester Bridge Trust ==
Rochester Bridge Act 1575
- Act of Parliament
- Parliament of England
- Long title: An Act for the perpetual Maintenance of Rochester Bridge.
- Citation: 18 Eliz. 1. c. 17
- Territorial extent: England and Wales

Dates
- Royal assent: 15 March 1576
- Commencement: 6 June 1576 (Note: Section 1. The Feast of Pentecost.)
- Repealed: 1 August 1908
Other legislation
Amended by	Rochester Bridge Act 1584
Repealed by	Rochester Bridge Act 1908
Relates to	Rochester Bridge Act 1421; Leases Act 1540

Status: Repealed

Text of statute as originally enacted

The road bridges and the services bridge continue to be maintained by the Rochester Bridge Trust, the modern incarnation of the Wardens and Commonalty of Rochester Bridge, which was established by King Richard II's letters patent in 1399. The trust still owns some of the land gifted to the wardens and used the income derived from the endowments to pay for the new bridges in 1856 (now the westbound lanes of the A2) and 1970 (eastbound A2) as well as meeting all the costs of maintaining those bridges and part of Rochester Esplanade.

Rochester Bridge Act 1908 (Note: Section 1.)
- Act of Parliament
- Parliament of the United Kingdom
- Long title: An Act to make better provisions for the constitution of the Court of Wardens and Assistants of Rochester Bridge in the county of Kent to empower the Court, to contribute to the funds of the New College of Cobham in the same county and for other purposes.
- Citation: 8 Edw. 7. c. lvii
- Territorial extent: United Kingdom

Dates
- Royal assent: 1 August 1908
- Commencement: 1 August 1908 (Note: Section 3.)
Other legislation
Amends	Bridges Act 1702; Rochester Bridge Act 1846; Rochester Bridge Amendment Act 1853
Repeals/revokes	Rochester Bridge Act 1421; Rochester Bridge Act 1575; Rochester Bridge Act 1584; Rochester Bridge Act 1876
Amended by	Medway Ports Reorganisation Scheme 1968 Confirmation Order 1969

Status: Amended

Text of statute as originally enacted

The trust is a charity with thirteen trustees, sometimes known locally as the Bridge Wardens. Six are nominated by the local councils and seven are appointed by the trust. The trust in its current form was re-established by an act of Parliament, the Rochester Bridge Act 1908 (8 Edw. 7. c. lvii), and is regulated by the Charity Commission.

=== Medway Tunnel ===
The trust also contributed to the construction of the Medway Tunnel (1996), a few miles downstream. The tunnel was operated under a 999-year lease first by Kent County Council and then Medway Council upon its formation. In 2008 the council purchased the freehold of the tunnel. It was the first immersed tube tunnel to be built in England and only the second of this type in the UK, the other being at Conwy, North Wales. The 720 metres (2,360 ft) long tunnel took four years to complete, at a cost of £80 million – and was opened by the Princess Royal on 12 June 1996.

=== Charitable acts ===
The trust has also made grants for local good causes ranging from a few thousand pounds to more significant grants. In particular, contributions have been made to the restoration of many important historic buildings in Kent.

In the 1880s, the trust founded Rochester and Maidstone Girls grammar schools and made large endowments to the Sir Joseph Williamson's Mathematical School in Rochester and the Maidstone Boys Grammar School.

=== Bridge Chapel ===
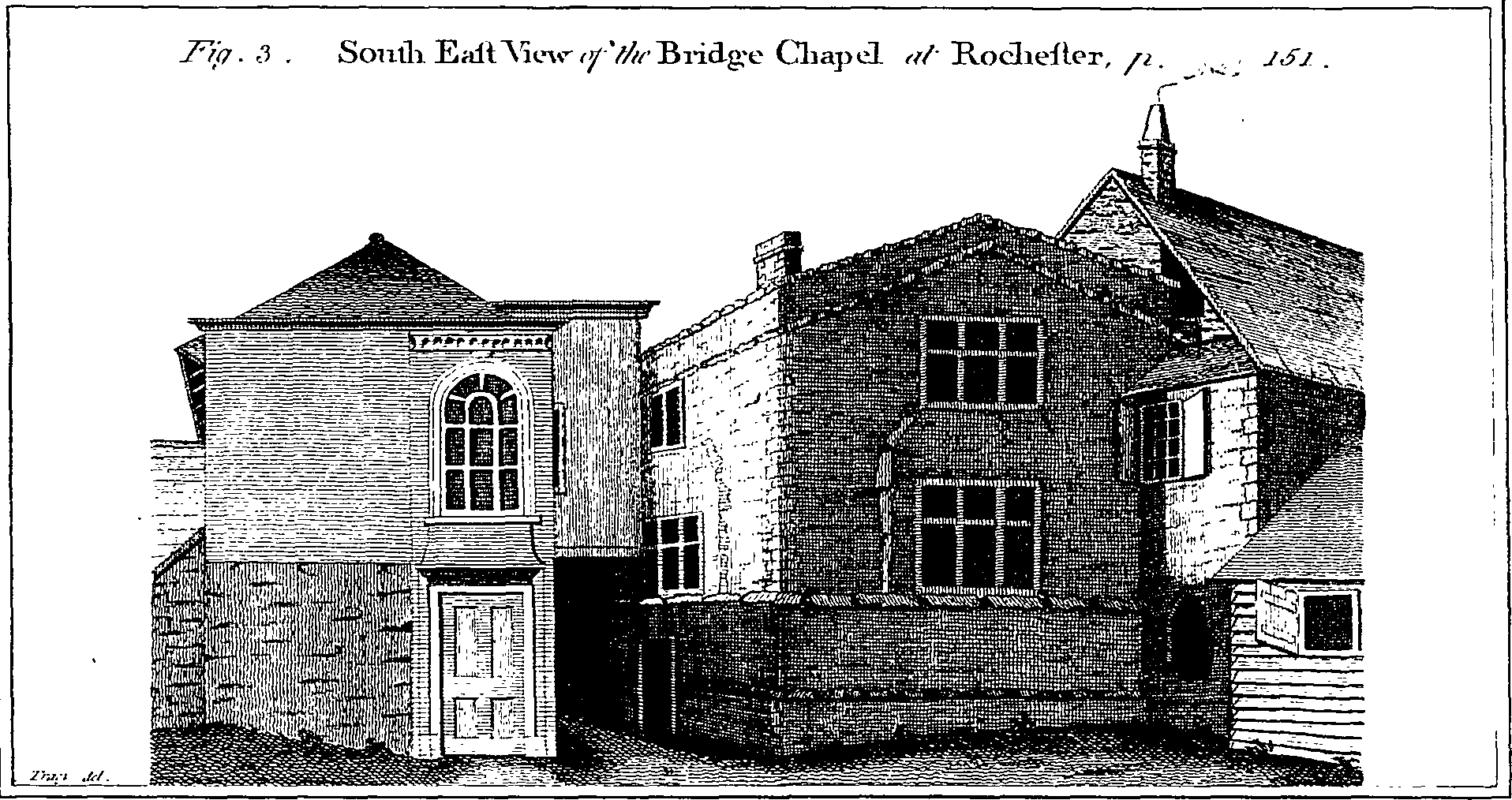
The Bridge Chapel in 1788

The Bridge Chapel was built in 1383. It was dissolved under the Chantries Act in 1548 and was used as a storeroom for bridge materials, a house, and later a pub and as a fruit shop. Over time it deteriorated and lost its roof. It was restored in the 1930s and used as a meeting room and exhibition space. Once a year, on All Souls' Day (2 November) it is used to hold a commemoration service for the founders of the Rochester Bridge Trust.
