= Cobham Aviation Services =

Cobham Aviation Services may refer to several Australian aviation companies formerly owned by Cobham:

- National Jet Express (formerly Cobham Aviation Services Australia - Regional Services), a charter airline and aviation services provider that was acquired by Rex Airlines in 2022
- National Jet Systems (formerly Cobham Aviation Services Australia - Airline Services), a regional domestic airline acquired by Qantas in 2020 and currently operating under the QantasLink banner
- Surveillance Australia (formerly Cobham Aviation Services Australia - Special Mission), an aviation company that conducts aerial surveillance and search and rescue flights on behalf of the Australian Border Force and Australian Maritime Safety Authority
