= Eliza Doyle Smith =

American songwriter

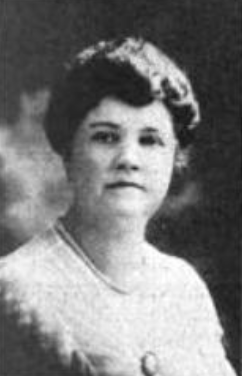
- Eliza Doyle Smith, from a 1922 publication
- Born: Eliza Ann Doyle; July 7, 1859; Grand Rapids, Michigan
- Died: October 16, 1932 (age 73); Oak Park, Illinois
- Occupations: Songwriter, composer, music publisher

Eliza Ann Doyle Smith (July 7, 1859 – October 16, 1932) was an American songwriter, composer, and sheet-music publisher, based in Chicago.

== Early life and education ==
Eliza Ann Doyle was born in Grand Rapids, Michigan, the daughter of Michael Doyle and Elizabeth Doyle. Her parents were both born in Ireland. She studied music in Cologne.

== Career ==
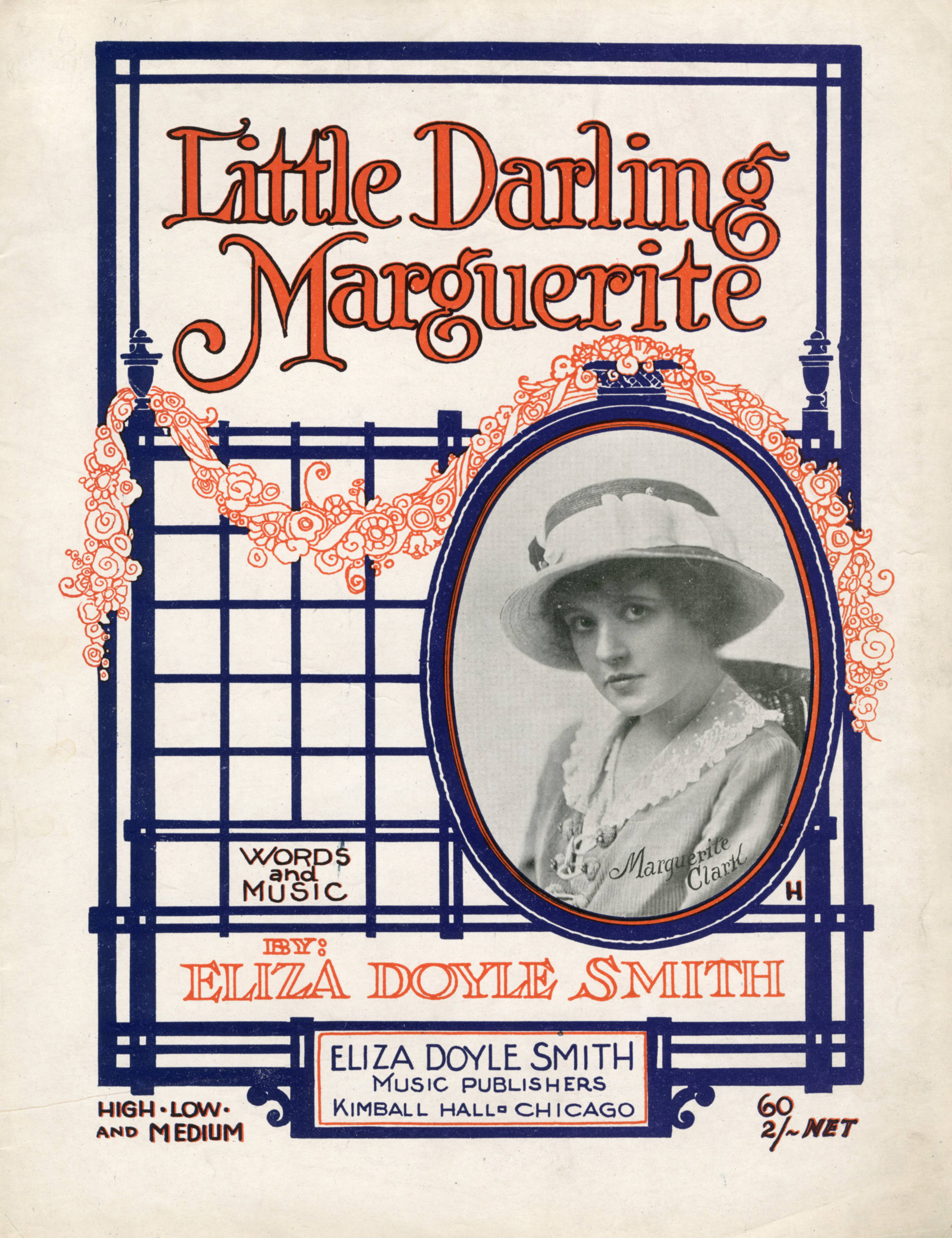
Sheet music cover, "Little Darling Marguerite" (1919)

Smith wrote operettas and poetry as a young woman. She owned and ran a sheet-music publishing company, based in Chicago. She published her own songs, and works by other songwriters, including Harlan Tarbell and John Loftus. "When I decided to go into the popular song writing I decided that success would come if I wrote songs fit to enter American homes but with the pep that modern youth demands and then let the world know of my goods by insistent advertising," she explained in a 1922 interview.

== Publications ==
Unless otherwise specified, titles below are songs written and composed by Smith.

- "When Uncle Sam Caught the Kaiser" (1917, a broadside poem)
- "United States Democracy March" (1918)
- "In Candy Land With You" (1919)
- "My Days Remember" (1919)
- "Sweet Norah Daly" (1919)
- "Stop Looking at Me!" (1919)
- "Little Darling Marguerite" (1919, arranged by Harry L. Alford)
- "O Wonderful Son of Life" (1920)
- "Dance Me On Your Knee" (1920)
- "Tea Rose" (1922, with John Loftus)
- "Love's Beautiful Song" (1922, with Charles Kovacs)

== Personal life ==
Eliza Doyle married Edgar Poe Smith. They had two daughters, Pauline and Marguerite. She died in 1932, in Oak Park, Illinois, at the age of 73.
