= George Cobham =

George Cobham may refer to:

- George A. Cobham Jr. (1825–1864), American Civil War officer
- George Brooke, 9th Baron Cobham (c. 1497–1558)
- George Cobham (MP) (fl.16th century), MP for Hedon and Portsmouth
