= Elizabeth Jane Smith (engineer) =

First woman to study engineering at a Scottish University

- Born: 3 October 1889; Edinburgh
- Died: Unknown
- Education: University of Edinburgh

Elizabeth Jane Smith (3 October 1889-?) was the first woman to study engineering at a Scottish University. She studied at the University of Edinburgh and although she did not graduate she went on to found and run the British Resorcin Manufacturing Co., Ltd in London.

== Education ==
She was born near Edinburgh and went first to Currie Primary, and then on to James Gillespie's High School for 4 years. At the age of 12 she went on to the Broughton Junior Student Centre, from where she entered the University of Edinburgh in 1909. She enrolled at first in an Arts degree and then switched to study for a Pure Science degree. Although she passed most of her courses, she left in 1913 without graduating.

== Work ==
In 1917 she founded and was Director of the British Resorcin Manufacturing Co Ltd, located at 162 Villiers Road, Willesden Green, London. Although the company was only operational for a few years (closing in 1922), they were listed as an exhibitor at the British Scientific Products Exhibition in August 1918, held at King's College London, and organised by the British Science Guild.
