= Thomas Cobham (disambiguation) =

Thomas Cobham (died 1327) was an English churchman.

Thomas Cobham may also refer to:

- Thomas Cobham (MP) (c. 1343–1394), MP for Kent, also known as Thomas Cobham, 3rd Baron Cobham, English nobleman and politician
- Thomas Cobham, 5th Baron Cobham (died 1471), English nobleman
- Thomas Brooke alias Cobham (1533–1578), MP for Rochester
- Thomas Cobham (actor) (1786–1842), British actor
