= John de Cobham, 2nd Baron Cobham (of Kent) =

English nobleman and politician

John de Cobham, 2nd Baron Cobham (died 1355) lord of the Manor of Cobham, Kent, was an English nobleman.

He was the eldest son and heir of Henry de Cobham, 1st Baron Cobham.

In 1320 he became Lord Warden of the Cinque Ports and constable of Dover Castle, succeeding his father in both positions. In 1334 he was appointed, along with his father, constable of Rochester Castle. The following year he was made Admiral for the region west of the Thames. After 1350, he served in Parliament for districts in Kent. He died in 1355.

He married Joan of Beauchamp, daughter of John Lord Beauchamp; after her death, he married one Agnes Stone of Dartford.

He is said to have been buried at Greyfriars, London. There also is what may then be a cenotaph to him at St Mary Magdalene Church, Cobham.

Peerage of England
Preceded by Henry de Cobham	Baron Cobham; 1339–1355	Succeeded by John de Cobham
