= John Oldcastle =

English Lollard leader (died 1417)

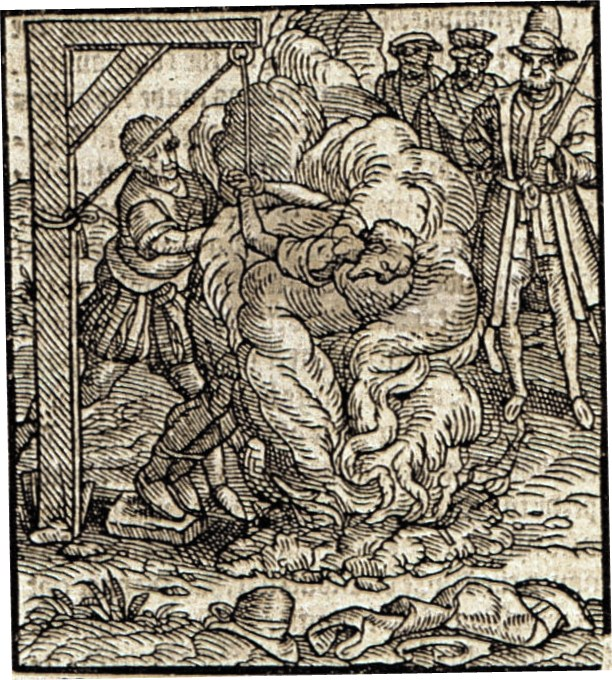
- John Oldcastle being burnt for insurrection and Lollard heresy
- Born: c. 1370; Herefordshire, England
- Died: 14 December 1417; St Giles's Fields, London, England

Sir John Oldcastle (died 14 December 1417) was an English Lollard leader. From 1409 to 1413, he was summoned to parliament as Baron Cobham, in the right of his wife.

Being a friend of Henry V, he long escaped prosecution for heresy. When convicted, he escaped from the Tower of London and then led a rebellion against the King. Eventually, he was captured and executed in London. He formed the basis (alongside Sir John Fastolf) for William Shakespeare's character John Falstaff, who was originally called John Oldcastle.

== Family ==
Oldcastle's date of birth is unknown; dubious and possibly apocryphal sources place it variously at 1360 or 1378, although 1370 is most likely closer to the truth.

His parents were Richard and Isabel Oldcastle of Almeley, Herefordshire. His grandfather, also called John Oldcastle, was Herefordshire's MP during the latter part of the reign of King Richard II.

== Early life ==
Oldcastle is first mentioned in two separate documents in 1400, first as a plaintiff in a suit regarding the advowson of Almeley church, and again as serving as a knight under Lord Grey of Codnor in a military expedition to Scotland.

Over the next few years, Oldcastle held notable positions in the Welsh campaigns of King Henry IV of England against Owain Glyndŵr, including captaincy first over Builth Castle in Brecknockshire and then over Kidwelly.

Oldcastle represented Herefordshire as a "knight of the shire" in the parliament of 1404, later serving as a justice of the peace, and was Sheriff of Herefordshire in 1406–07.

In 1408, he married Joan, the heiress of Cobham — his third marriage, and her fourth. This resulted in a significant improvement of his fortune and status, as the Cobhams were "one of the most notable families of Kent". The marriage brought Oldcastle a number of manors in Kent, Norfolk, Northamptonshire and Wiltshire, as well as Cooling Castle, and from 1409 until his accusation in 1413 he was summoned to parliament as Lord Cobham.

At some point in his military career, Oldcastle became a trusted supporter of Henry, Prince of Wales, later to become King Henry V, who regarded Sir John as "one of his most trustworthy soldiers".

Oldcastle was a member of the expedition which the young Henry sent to France in 1411 in a successful campaign to assist the Burgundians in the Armagnac-Burgundian Civil War.

== Lollardy ==
Lollardy had many supporters in Herefordshire, and Oldcastle himself had adopted Lollard doctrines before 1410, when the churches on his wife's estates in Kent were laid under interdict for unlicensed preaching. In the convocation which met in March 1413, shortly before the death of Henry IV, Oldcastle was at once accused of heresy.

But his friendship with the new King Henry V prevented any decisive action until convincing evidence was found in one of Oldcastle's books, which was discovered in a shop in Paternoster Row, London. The matter was brought before the King, who desired that nothing should be done until he had tried his personal influence. Oldcastle declared his readiness to submit to the king "all his fortune in this world" but was firm in his religious beliefs.

When Oldcastle fled from Windsor Castle to his own castle at Cooling, Henry at last consented to a prosecution. Oldcastle refused to obey archbishop Thomas Arundel's repeated citations, and it was only under a Royal Writ that he at last appeared before the ecclesiastical court on 23 September 1413.

In a confession of his faith, Oldcastle declared his belief in the sacraments and the necessity of penance and confession addressed to God, but he would not assent to the orthodox doctrine of the sacraments as stated by the Bishops, nor admit the necessity for the Sacrament of Confession and Absolution being administered by a priest. He also said, similarly to the Iconoclasts of the Byzantine Empire and in contradiction of St John of Damascus, that the use of Christian art as an aid to prayer is, "the great sin of idolatry". On 25 September, Oldcastle was convicted as a heretic and sentenced to execution by burning.

King Henry V was still anxious to find a means of sparing the life of his old comrade, and ordered a reprieve of forty days in the hopes that Oldcastle might repent his views. Before that time had expired, however, Oldcastle had escaped from the Tower with the help of one William Fisher, a Lollard parchment-maker from Smithfield.

== Open rebellion ==
Oldcastle now put himself at the head of a widespread Lollard conspiracy. Despite the Christian pacifism preached by Wycliffe, the conspiracy were plotting regime change using violence and, if necessary, even civil war. The plan was to seize the King and his brothers in a palace coup during the Twelfth-night mumming at Eltham, and establish some sort of Commonwealth. Oldcastle would to be declared Regent, the king, English nobility and clergy would then be imprisoned. The religious orders would be forcibly dissolved and the property of the Catholic Church in England was to be divided up among the Lollards and used to create a new ruling class. King Henry, forewarned of Oldcastle's intentions by two moles inside the Lollard movement, instead moved to London. When the Lollard army assembled in force in St Giles's Fields on 10 January they were easily defeated by the king and the vastly superior numbers in his forces.

Oldcastle escaped into deepest northwest Herefordshire, and for nearly four years avoided capture.

He is believed to have been privy to the Southampton Plot in July 1415, when the Lollards pledged support and Oldcastle stirred some movement in the Welsh Marches. However, following the failure of the scheme he went again into hiding.

== Capture and death ==
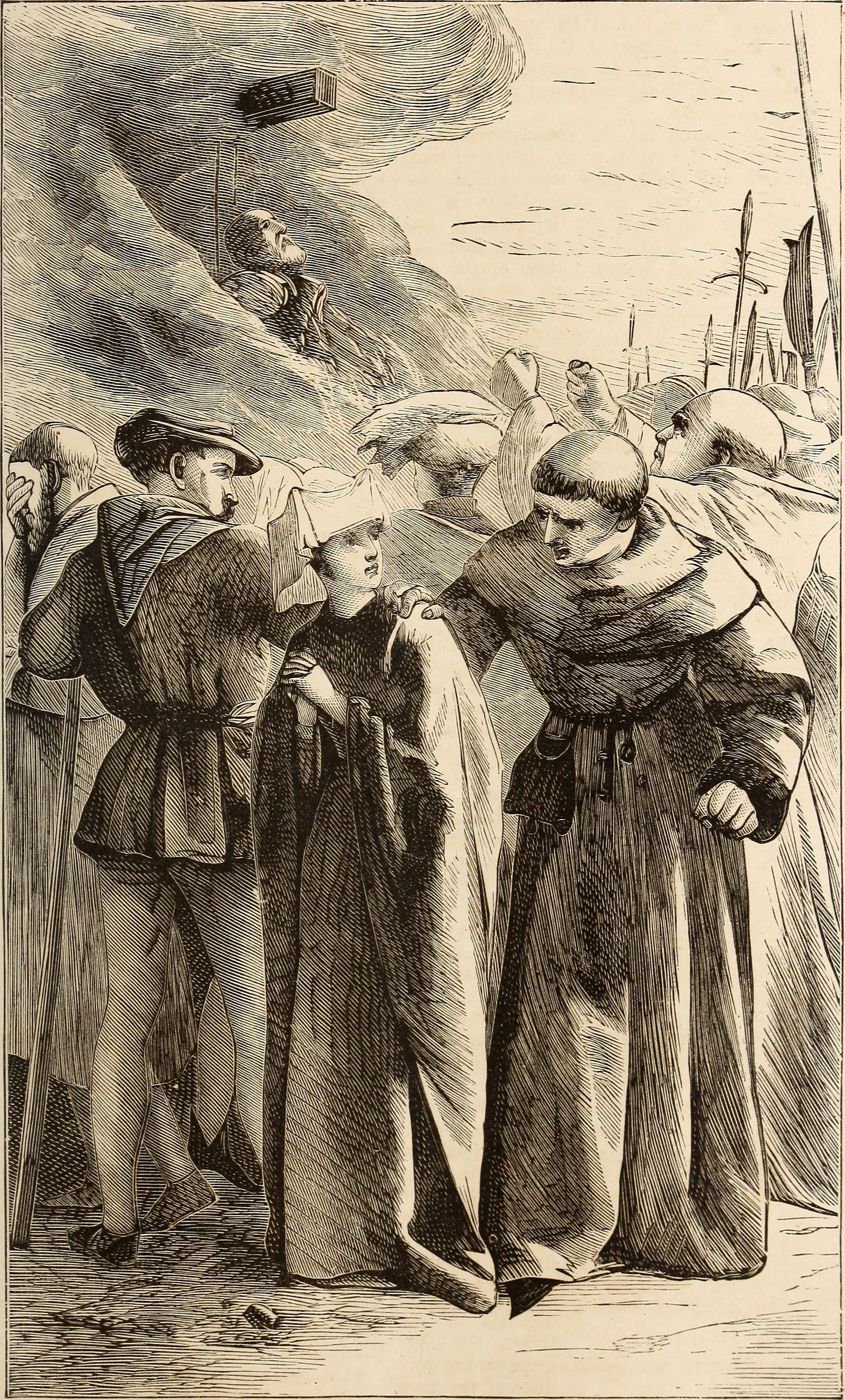
Illustration of the burning of John Oldcastle, 1870

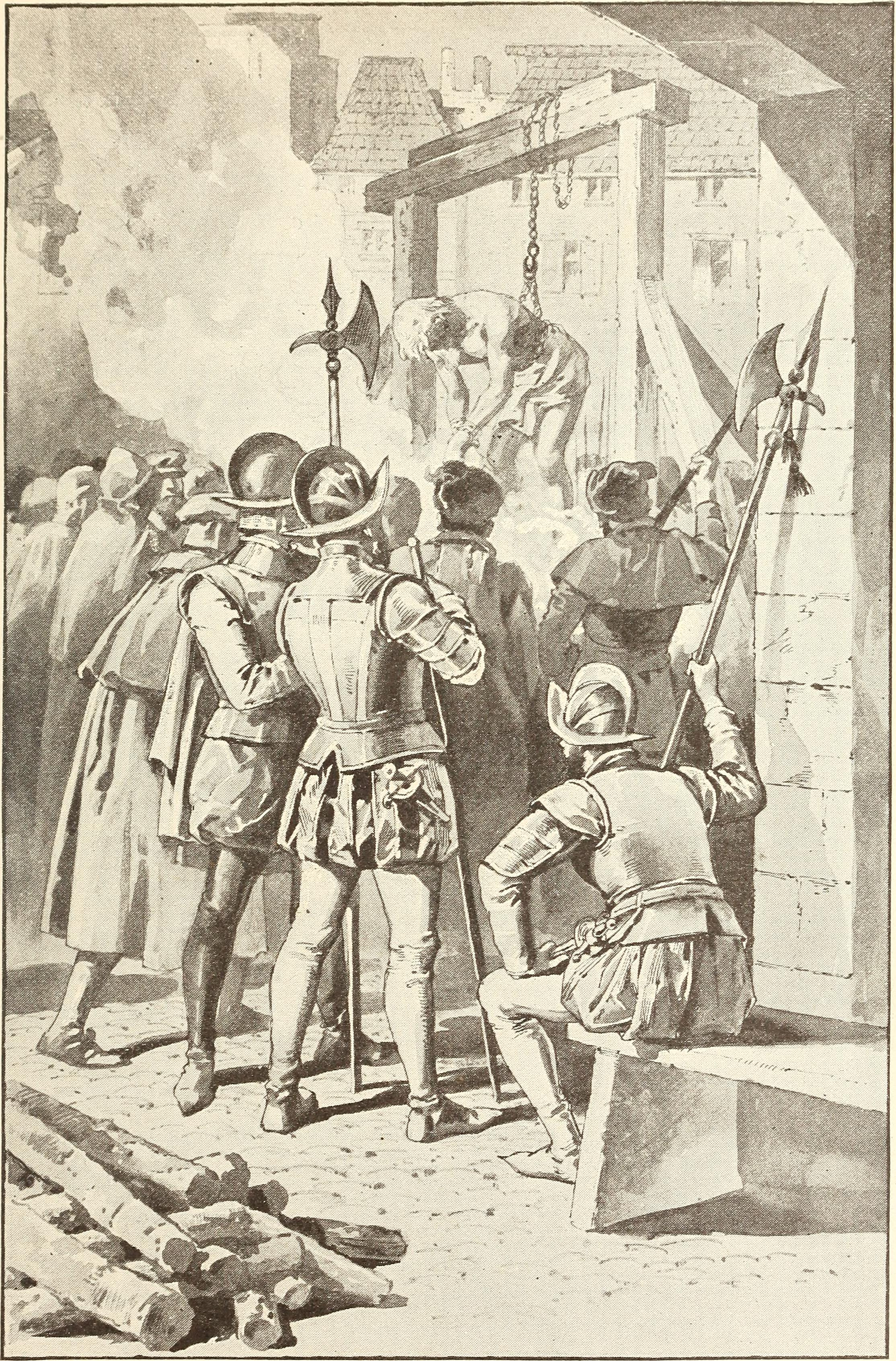
Illustration of Oldcastle's hanging (1895)

In November 1417 his hiding-place was at last discovered and he was captured by Edward Charleton, 5th Baron Cherleton. Some historians believed he was captured in the upland Olchon Valley of western Herefordshire adjacent to the Black Mountains, Wales, not far from the village of Oldcastle itself in his family's old heartlands. He is said to have been hiding with some Lollard friends at a glade on Pant-mawr farm in Broniarth, Wales, called Cobham's Garden.

The principal agents in the capture were four of the tenants of Edward Charleton, 5th Baron Cherleton, two of them being Ieuan and Sir Gruffudd Vychan, sons of Gruffudd ap Ieuan.

Oldcastle who was "sore wounded ere he would be taken", was brought to London in a horse-litter. The reward for his capture was awarded to Baron Cherleton, but he died before receiving it, though a portion was paid to his widow in 1422.

On 14 December he was formally condemned, on the record of his previous conviction, and that same day was hanged in St Giles's Fields, and burnt "gallows and all". It is not clear whether he was burnt alive for heresy or whether he was hanged, drawn, and quartered for high treason first.

== Literary portrayals ==
His heretical opinions and early friendship with Henry V created a traditional scandal which long continued. In the old play The Famous Victories of Henry V, written before 1588, Oldcastle figures as the Prince's boon companion. When Shakespeare adapted that play in Henry IV, Part 1, Oldcastle still appeared, but when the play was printed in 1598, the name was changed to Falstaff (modelled after Sir John Fastolf), due to the objections of one of Oldcastle's highly influential descendants, the Queen's official censor of stage plays Henry Brooke, 11th Baron Cobham.

Although Shakespeare's drunken, morbidly obese, and hedonistic excuse for a medieval knight still remains "my old lad of the Castle", the stage character has many differences from the Lollard rebel leader. In Henry IV, Part 2 an epilogue alleges that Falstaff is not meant to be Oldcastle: "Falstaff shall die of a sweat, unless already a' be killed with your hard opinions; for Oldcastle died a martyr, and this is not the man." In 1599, another play, Sir John Oldcastle, presented Oldcastle in a far less negative light.

John Oldcastle is the hero of Eliza Bland Smith Erskine Norton's 1848 Anti-Catholic play The Martyr, wherein he is referred to by the title Lord Cobham and engaged to Matilda Vernon, rather than married to Joan Oldcastle (née Cobham).

== Bibliography ==
The record of Oldcastle's trial is printed in Fasciculi Zizaniorum (Rolls series) and in David Wilkins's Concilia, iii. 351–357. The chief contemporary notices of his later career are given in Gesta Henrici Quinti (Eng. Hist. Soc.) and in Walsingham's Historia Anglicana. There have been many lives of Oldcastle, mainly based on The Actes and Monuments of John Foxe, who in his turn followed the Briefe Chronycle of John Bale, first published in 1544.

For notes on Oldcastle's early career, consult James Hamilton Wylie, History of England under Henry IV. For literary history see the Introductions to Richard James's Iter Lancastrense (Chetham Society, 1845) and to Grosart's edition of the Poems of Richard James (1880). See also W. Barske, Oldcastle-Falstaff in der englischen Literatur bis zu Shakespeare (Palaestra, 1. Berlin, 1905).
