= Madge Smith =

Canadian photographer (1898–1974)

- Born: Elizabeth Marjorie Smith; April 7, 1898; Iden, Sussex, England
- Died: April 18, 1974 (aged 76); Fredericton, New Brunswick, Canada
- Education: Fredericton Business College
- Known for: Photography
- Parents: Edwin James Smith (father); Beatrice Neeves (mother)

Madge Smith (born Elizabeth Marjorie Smith, 7 April 1898 – 18 April 1974) was an English-born Canadian photographer.

== Early life ==
Elizabeth Marjorie Smith was born on 7 April 1898, in the Iden village of Sussex, England. She was one of the seven children of Edwin James Smith and his wife Beatrice Neeves. Around three years later, the Smiths immigrated to Fredericton, New Brunswick, Canada. In 1917, Smith enrolled herself at the Fredericton Business College.

== Career ==
While in high school, Smith developed her interest in photography. She worked for the Harvey Studios before setting up her own store in Fredericton in 1936. She sold photographs and local craft items there, including paintings by Pegi Nicol MacLeod, Jack Humphrey and Miller Brittain and Deichmann pottery,. Arts classes for children were also organised at her store, as were several functions of the Maritime Art Association.

In addition to managing her store, Smith also took pictures of city life and important events including George VI's 1939 royal tour of Canada. Her second store was opened in 1940. A collection of her photographs is held at the Provincial Archives of New Brunswick. The Archives and the University of New Brunswick showcased her works in a joint exhibition conducted in 1970. She is credited for bringing more attention to local artists from New Brunswick.

== Death ==
Smith died on 18 April 1974 in Fredericton, New Brunswick.
