= John Cobham, 3rd Baron Cobham =

John Cobham, 3rd Baron Cobham (c. 1316–January 1408), lord of the Manor of Cobham, Kent, was the son of John Cobham, 2nd Baron Cobham, and Joan Beauchamp, daughter of John Beauchamp, 1st Baron Beauchamp of Somerset. He was given a licence to crenellate by Richard II in 1381 and built Cooling Castle at the family seat at Cowling or Cooling, Kent.

Around 1332, Sir John married Margaret Courtenay, daughter of Hugh Courtenay, 10th Earl of Devon. She died on 2 August 1385 or 95. In 1398 Sir John was exiled to Guernsey. Henry IV restored the estate and Sir John died at Cooling, 1408. He was buried at Greyfriars, London, though his brass is near his wife in the church of St Mary Magdalene, Cobham.

According to a lengthy article by Mr. J. G. Waller entitled "The Lords of Cobham, their Monuments and the Church," published in Volume 11 (1877) of Archaeologia Cantiana, the bulletin of the Kent Archaeological Society, at the time of his death Lord John Cobham was approximately 92 years old.

== Rochester Bridge ==
Sir John and Sir Robert Knolles (or Knollys), paid for the building of the new, stone Rochester Bridge across the River Medway. This route had been essential for traffic between London and Dover (the port for France and hence continental Europe) since Roman times.

Peerage of England
Preceded by John Cobham	Baron Cobham; 1355–1408	Succeeded by Joan Oldcastell
