= Anne Braye, Baroness Cobham =

English noblewoman (1501–1558)

Anne Braye
- Baroness Cobham
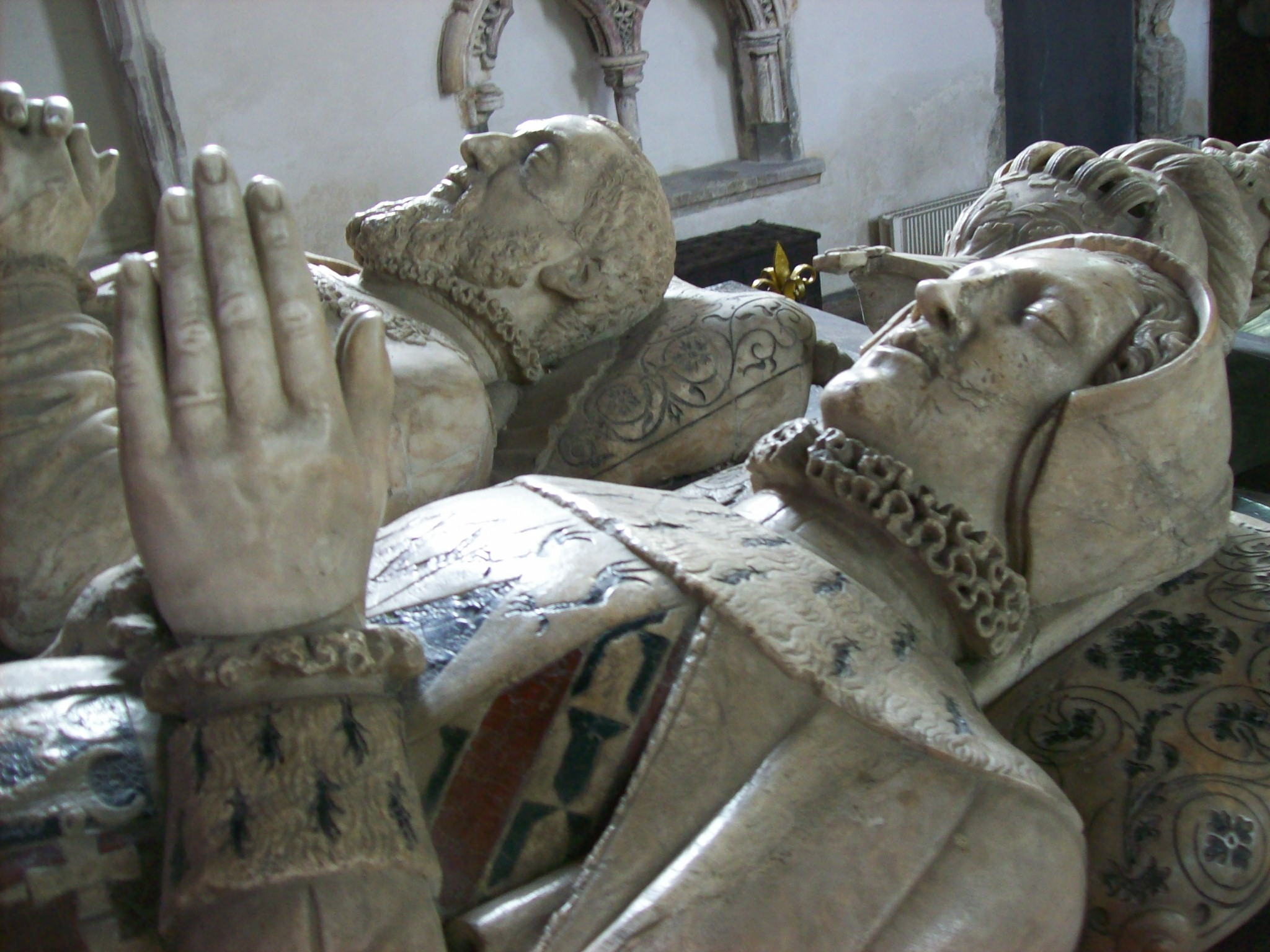
- Effigies of Anne Braye and her husband, George Brooke, 9th Baron Cobham on their tomb in St Mary Magdalene parish church, Cobham, Kent
- Born: 21 March 1501; Eaton Bray, Bedfordshire, England
- Died: 1 November 1558 (aged 57 years); Cobham Hall, Kent
- Buried: St Mary Magdalene parish church, Cobham, Kent
- Spouse: George Brooke, 9th Baron Cobham
- Issue: Dorothy Brooke; Anne Brooke; Elizabeth Brooke; William Brooke, 10th Baron Cobham; Catherine Brooke; George Brooke; Thomas Brooke; John Brooke; Henry Brooke
- Father: Sir Edmund Braye, 1st Baron Braye
- Mother: Jane Halliwell

Anne Brooke, Baroness Cobham (née Braye; 21 March 1501 – 1 November 1558) was the wife of Sir George Brooke, 9th Baron Cobham. She was the attendant horsewoman at Anne Boleyn's coronation as Queen Consort on 1 June 1533, and she was allegedly one of the first accusers of Queen Anne in 1536. Anne Braye was Baroness Cobham from 1529 until her death in 1558.

== Marriage and issue ==
Anne Braye was born on 21 March 1501 in Eaton Bray, Bedfordshire, England, the eldest daughter of Sir Edmund Braye (circa 1480 – 18 October 1539), who would be created 1st Baron Braye on 4 December 1529 by King Henry VIII of England, and Jane Halliwell (circa 1480 – 24 October 1558). She had a brother, John Braye, 2nd Baron Braye, of whom she was one of his co-heirs, along with her younger sisters, Elizabeth, Frideswide, Mary, Frances, and Dorothy Bray, Baroness Chandos. The last was 23 years Anne's junior.

In 1517 or before 1526, she married George Brooke (1497 – 29 September 1558), the brother-in-law of poet Sir Thomas Wyatt. He was knighted in July 1523 by the Earl of Surrey after the taking of Morlaix, and he would succeed his father as 9th Baron Cobham on 19 July 1529; henceforth, Anne was styled as Baroness Cobham. They lived at Cobham Hall in Kent and Cowling Castle.

Together George and Anne had 10 sons and five daughters. These included:

- Dorothy Brooke (b.1518)
- Anne Brooke, 1523 - 1548, who married Sir Anthony Weldon, 1518 - 1573, in Swanscombe, Kent, England. Together they had two sons:
  - Sir Thomas Weldon, 1535, Weldon, Northumberland, England and died 1594 in Kildare, Ireland.
  - Sir Ralph Weldon, 1545 in Swanscombe, Kent, England and died 12 NOV 1609 in England.
- Elizabeth Brooke (25 June 1526 – 2 April 1565), married bigamously William Parr, 1st Marquess of Northampton, while he was still wed to Anne Bourchier, 7th Baroness Bourchier.
- Sir William Brooke, 10th Baron Cobham (1 November 1527 – 6 March 1597), married firstly, Dorothy Neville, by whom he had one daughter; and secondly in 1560, Frances Newton, one of Queen Elizabeth I's Ladies of the Bedchamber by whom he had seven children.
- Catherine Brooke (b.c.1527), married John Jerningham, by whom she had issue.
- George Brooke (27 January 1533–70), married Christiana Duke, by whom he had issue.
- Thomas Brooke (1533–78), married and had issue.
- John Brooke (1535–94)
- Sir Henry Brooke (5 February 1537 or 1538 – circa 1591 or January 1592), married Anne Sutton (died January 1611 or 1612), daughter of Sir Henry Sutton, from Nottinghamshire, by whom he had issue John Brooke, 1st Baron Cobham and Philippa Brooke (died circa September 1613, buried at Stockeston, Leicestershire, 28 September 1613), wife of Walter Calverley and Sir Thomas Burton, 1st Baronet

== Anne Boleyn's coronation ==
In April 1533, Anne received a letter of summons from the King to attend the coronation of his second wife, Anne Boleyn. She was allocated the role of Queen Anne's attendant horsewoman for the royal procession from the Tower of London to the Queen's coronation at Westminster Abbey, and as such was required to find white palfreys for herself and her ladies. Although her own robes and long cloth of gold trapper for her horse were provided for, Anne was expected to equip her attendants herself.

Her husband was a distant cousin of Anne Boleyn, through his mother, Dorothy Heydon whose own mother, Anne was an aunt of Sir Thomas Boleyn.

Barbara J. Harris, in her book, Women and Politics in Early Tudor England, states that according to John Hussey in a letter to Lord Lisle, Anne was one of Queen Anne Boleyn's first accusers in 1536 and was a source of information against the Queen. Her husband was one of the 27 peers who presided at Anne Boleyn's trial in May of that year.

== Later years and death ==
In 1554, her husband and two of her sons were sent to the Tower of London under suspicion of having conspired in the rebellion of Thomas Wyatt, to depose Mary I of England, and replace her with her half-sister, Elizabeth. After paying a large fine, they were eventually released.

Her eldest daughter, Elizabeth, who had bigamously married William Parr, Marquess of Northampton, while his wife, Anne Bourchier, still lived, was allegedly behind the earlier, failed plot in 1553 to place Lady Jane Grey upon the English throne.

Lady Cobham wrote her last will on 7 October 1558; she died on 1 November. She was buried in the chancel of St Mary Magdalene Church, in Cobham, Kent, beside her husband, who had died the previous September.

A magnificent tomb, with an effigy, was erected in 1561 and the Latin inscription was placed there by her eldest son, William, Baron Cobham. The English translation reads in part: "Here Anna lies, a lady chaste and fair, Blest with her children's love and husband's care. 'Twas in the last sad year of Mary's reign That first the husband, then the wife, was ta'en".
