= George Brooke, 9th Baron Cobham =

English noble

George Brooke, 9th Baron Cobham KG
- Baron Cobham
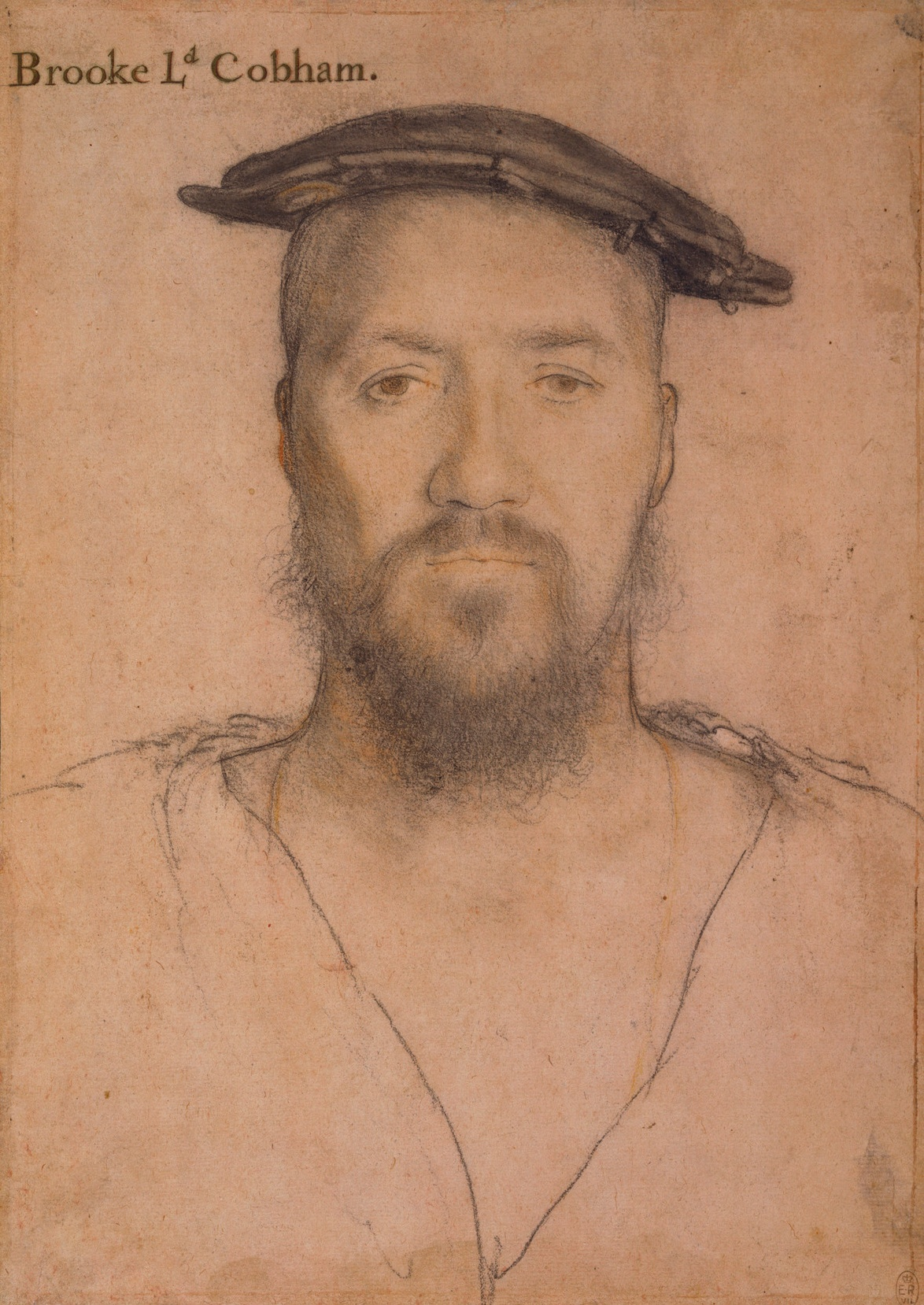
- George Brooke, 9th Baron Cobham, portrait by Hans Holbein the Younger
- Born: c. 1497
- Died: 29 September 1558 (around age 61)
- Spouse: Anne Braye
- Issue others...: William Brooke, 10th Baron Cobham; Sir Henry Brooke; Elisabeth Brooke, Marchioness of Northampton
- Father: Thomas Brooke, 8th Baron Cobham
- Mother: Dorothy Heydon

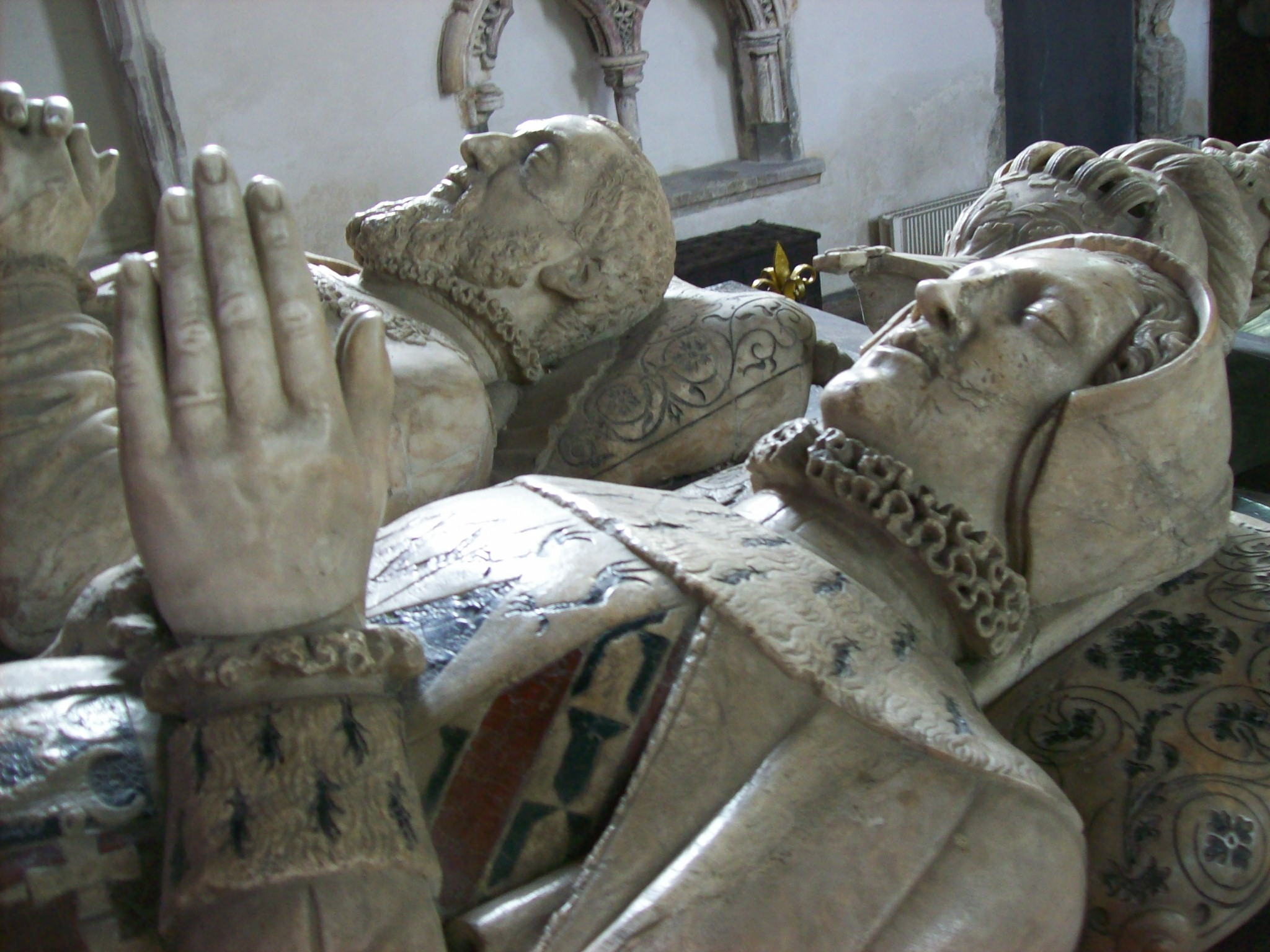
Detail of effigies of George Brooke, 9th Baron Cobham, and of his wife Anne Bray, St. Mary Magdalene's Church, Cobham, Kent. Anne displays on her chest the two coats of arms of Bray: Argent, a chevron between three eagle's claws erased sable (centre) and Gules, three bends vair (on her left side)

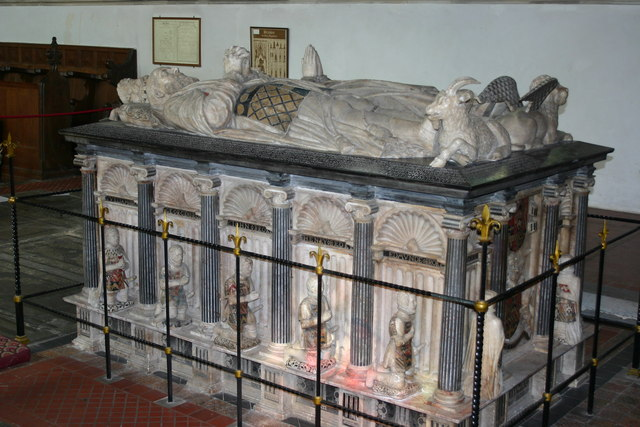
Monument and effigy of George Brooke, 9th Baron Cobham, and of his wife Anne Bray, St. Mary Magdalene's Church, Cobham, Kent. On his robe are painted the arms of St. Amand: Or fretty sable, on a chief of the second three plates

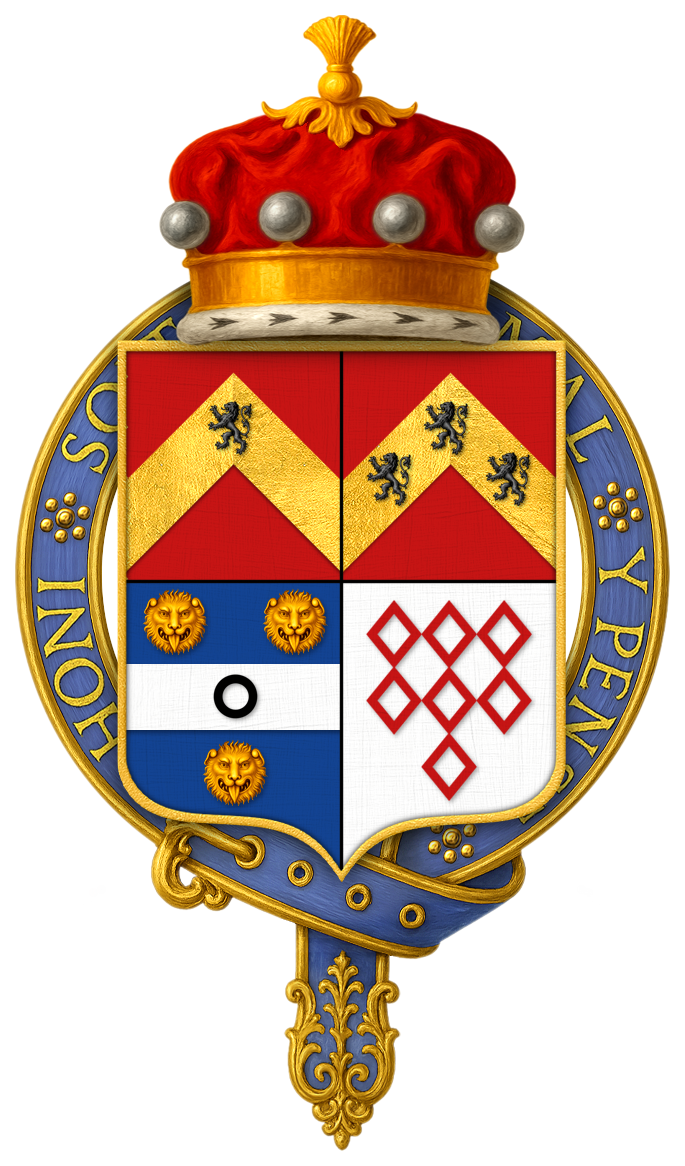
Quartered arms of Sir George Brooke, 9th Baron Cobham, KG

Arms of Brooke, Baron Cobham "of Kent": Gules, on a chevron argent a lion rampant sable crowned or

George Brooke, 9th Baron Cobham (c. 1497 – 29 September 1558) lord of the Manor of Cobham, Kent and of Cooling Castle, Kent, was an English peer, soldier and magnate, who participated in the political turmoil following the death of King Henry VIII.

== Origins ==
He was the eldest surviving son of Thomas Brooke, 8th Baron Cobham by his first wife Dorothy Heydon, a daughter of Sir Henry Heydon and Anne Boleyn.

His paternal grandparents were John Brooke, 7th Baron Cobham and Margaret Neville, a daughter of Edward Neville, 3rd Baron Bergavenny and Katherine Howard. His maternal grandparents were Sir Henry Heydon and Anne Boleyn, daughter of Geoffrey Boleyn and cousin to King Henry VIII's second wife and Queen Consort, Anne Boleyn. The 3rd Baron Bergavenny was the youngest son of Ralph Neville, 1st Earl of Westmorland and his second wife, Lady Joan Beaufort, daughter of Prince John of Gaunt's third marriage and half-sister of King Henry IV. Bergavenny's wife, Katherine Howard, was the daughter of Sir Robert Howard and Lady Margaret Mowbray. Katherine's brother was the first Howard Duke of Norfolk. Norfolk was an ancestor to the two wives of Henry VIII that were beheaded, Anne Boleyn and Katherine Howard.

== Career ==
In his youth he accompanied his father to the marriage of Princess Mary (sister of King Henry VIII), to King Louis XII of France. He returned to France during the 1520s, fighting with distinction around Calais.

In 1517 or before 1526 he married Anne Bray. In July 1523, after the taking or Morlaix, he was invested as a Knight by the Earl of Surrey and succeeded in his father's title in November 1529. In 1536 he was one of the 27 peers for the trial of his second cousin Queen Anne Boleyn. After the dissolution of the monasteries he received large grants of land.

In July 1523 after the taking of Morlaix, he was invested as a Knight by Thomas Howard, Earl of Surrey and succeeded to his father's title in November 1529. In 1536 he was one of the 27 peers at the trial of his second cousin Queen Anne Boleyn. After the Dissolution of the Monasteries he acquired much former monastic property. At home in Kent, he fulfilled his feudal duties, serving as Justice of the Peace for the county. In 1544, he occupied a high position in the English army that invaded Scotland; later that year, he was appointed commanding officer of English-controlled Calais, a personal possession of the king. In 1546 he became Lieutenant-General against the Scots, under the Earl of Hertford. He was made a Knight of the Garter on 24 April 1549.

Brooke's family were dogged by scandal. His sister, Elizabeth Brooke, was married to Sir Thomas Wyatt but lived openly in adultery with another man. Allegedly she attracted the attention of Henry VIII in 1542, and Eustace Chapuys, the Imperial ambassador, thought that had she tried she could have become Henry's sixth wife. His daughter, Elisabeth Brooke, Marchioness of Northampton, was also prone to scandal as from 1543 she had lived with her future husband William Parr, 1st Marquess of Northampton whilst he was separated from his wife Anne Bourchier, 7th Baroness Bourchier. They eventually married during the reign of Edward VI, but this was declared invalid by Mary I. In the reign of Elizabeth I, their marriage was finally confirmed as valid.

He resigned his post in 1550 and became a member of the Privy Council of Edward VI on 23 May. After Edward's death, Brooke supported the attempt by John Dudley, 1st Duke of Northumberland to place his daughter-in-law Lady Jane Grey on the throne. He was pardoned by Queen Mary I, but subsequently fell under suspicion again. His nephew, Sir Thomas Wyatt the Younger was the leader of Wyatt's Rebellion, a Protestant rebellion which brought suspicion on the whole family. Brooke's daughter, Elizabeth Brooke, is thought to have been the instigator of the plot to place Jane Grey on the throne instead of Mary I. During Wyatt's rebellion, Wyatt besieged and took Cobham in the latter's home, Cooling Castle; Brooke claimed to have resisted, but after the rebellion failed, he was accused of complicity in the rebellion and imprisoned in the Tower of London for a brief period, but was released. The next year, at the start of the Roman Catholic Queen's formal reconciliation with the Holy See, he was assigned to welcome to England the papal legate Cardinal Pole, who went on to be responsible for many Protestant martyrdoms in England. The entertainment is recorded as having taken place at Cooling Castle in 1555.

After his release, Brooke limited himself to local affairs in Kent. He died in 1558, closely followed by his wife, Anne Bray. An inquest post mortem was held for his on 20 January 1558/1559 and his will, dated 13 January 1557/1558, was probated on 6 December 1560. He was succeeded in the barony by his son, William.

== Marriage and issue ==
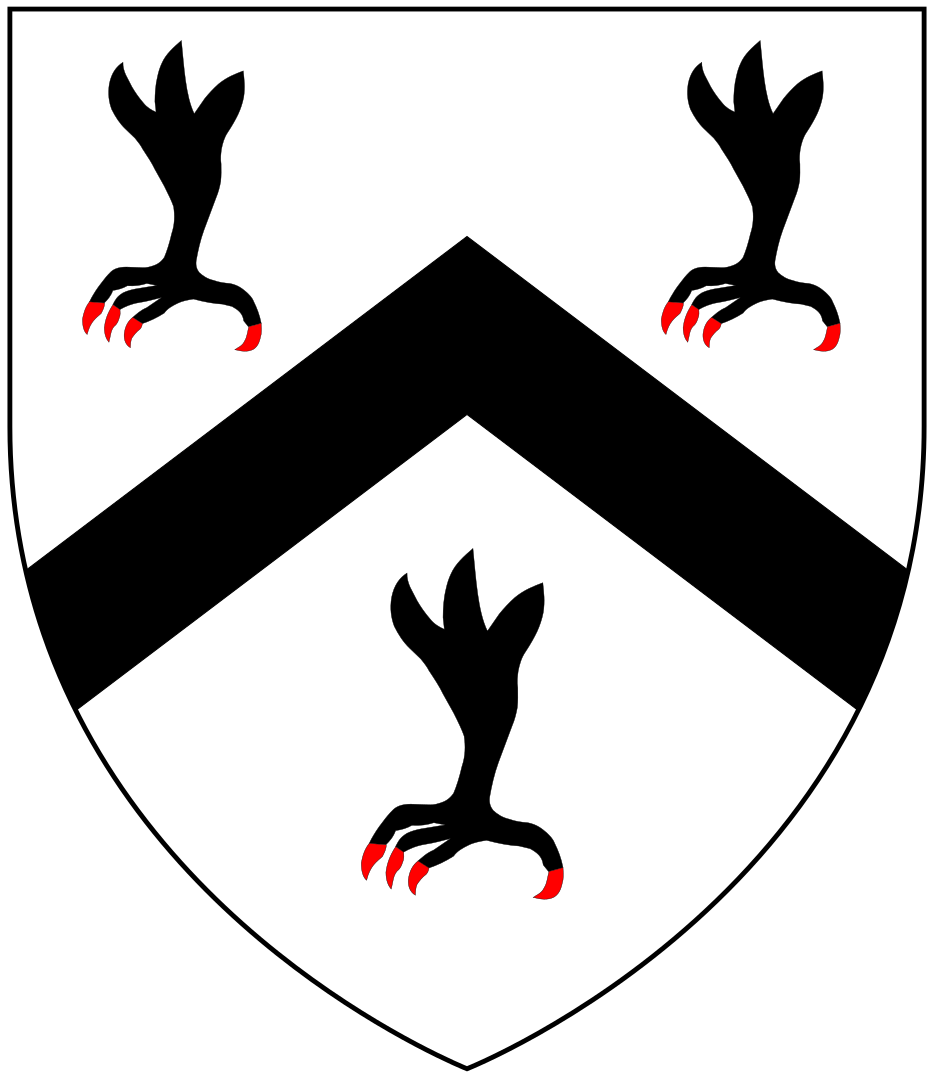
Arms of Braye: Argent, a chevron between three eagle's legs erased sable, quartered by the couple's descendants

In about 1517, certainly before 1526, at Eaton Bray in Bedfordshire, he married Anne Braye (b.1501), eldest daughter and co-heiress of Edmund Braye, 1st Baron Braye (c.1480–1539), of Eaton Bray, by his heiress wife Jane Halliwell (c.1480–1558). By his wife he had issue ten sons and four daughters:

=== Sons ===
- William Brooke, 10th Baron Cobham (1 November 1527 – 6 March 1597), eldest son and heir, who married firstly, Dorothy Nevill, by whom he had one daughter, and secondly in 1560, Frances Newton, a Lady of the Bedchamber to Queen Elizabeth I, by whom he had seven children.
- George Brooke (27 January 1533 – 1570), who married Christian or Christiana Duke, only daughter and sole heiress (of his unsettled lands) of Richard Duke (c. 1515 – 1572), MP, of Otterton, Devon, by whom he had issue:
  - Duke Brooke;
  - Peter Brooke;
- Thomas Brooke (1533–1578), alias "Thomas Cobham", MP, married and had issue.
- John Brooke (22 April 1535 – 1594), alias "John Cobham", who before 1561 married Lady Alice Norton (alias Cobbe), widow of Sir John Norton of Northwood, Milton, Kent, without issue.
- Sir Henry Brooke (5 February 1537 or 1538 – c. 1591 or January 1592), who married Anne Sutton (d. circa January 1611 or 1612), a daughter of Sir Henry Sutton of Nottinghamshire, by whom he had issue:
  - John Brooke, 1st Baron Cobham;
  - Philippa Brooke (d. c. September 1613, buried at Stockeston, Leicestershire, on 28 September 1613), wife successively of Walter Calverley and Sir Thomas Burton, 1st Baronet;
  - Ann Brooke, wife of Edward Evenden.

=== Daughters ===
- Dorothy Brooke (b. 1518);
- Elisabeth Brooke (25 June 1526 – 2 April 1565), who married (bigamously, as his second wife) William Parr, 1st Marquess of Northampton (only brother of Queen Katherine Parr, last of the six wives of king Henry VIII), while he was deemed still wedded to Anne Bourchier, 7th Baroness Bourchier, having obtained a legally incomplete divorce. Without issue. Having unsuccessfully consulted doctors in Antwerp, she died of breast cancer at the Blackfriars and was buried in nearby St. Paul's Cathedral in the City of London;
- Katherine Brooke (b. c. 1527), who married John Jerningham, by whom she had issue.

== Death and burial ==
He died on 29 September 1558, closely followed by his wife, Anne Bray, and was buried in the chancel of St. Mary Magdalene's Church, Cobham. His inquisition post mortem was held on 20 January 1559 and his will, dated 13 January 1557/1558, was proved on 6 December 1560. He was succeeded by his eldest son, William Brooke, 10th Baron Cobham.

Peerage of England
| Preceded by Thomas Brooke | Baron Cobham; 1497–1558 | Succeeded by William Brooke |
