= Henry Bourchier =

Henry Bourchier may refer to:

- Henry Bourchier, 1st Earl of Essex (c. 1404–1483), English peer
- Henry Bourchier, 2nd Earl of Essex (died 1540), English peer
- Henry Bourchier, 5th Earl of Bath (1587–1654), English peer
