= William Cobham =

William Cobham may refer to:

- William Cobham (musician)
- William Brooke, 10th Baron Cobham
