= Thomas Brooke alias Cobham =

Thomas Brooke (1533-1578), (alias Cobham) of Wandsworth, Surrey, was an English nobleman, privateer, conspirator, and briefly a member of parliament.

A son of George Brooke, 9th Baron Cobham (died 1558), lord of the Manor of Cobham, Kent and of Cooling Castle, Kent, and a brother of William Brooke, 10th Baron Cobham (1527–1597), Lord Warden of the Cinque Ports, Brooke was notable mainly for his seafaring activities.

As a youth, Brooke was tutored at the University of Orleans by Nicholas Alenus, who found him to be "licentious and idle", avoiding lectures and spending whole days in taverns, playing tennis, and "wandering with lost men". Nothing is known of him from 1550 until February 1554, when he and his family were accused of being connected with the rebellion of their kinsman Sir Thomas Wyatt, and Brooke was one of those sent to the Tower of London. It is reported that Sir Nicholas Poyntz asked him "What wind headed you to work such treason?", and Brooke replied "Oh, sir! I was seduced". With others, he was pardoned and released in December 1554, and soon entered the service of the Earl of Pembroke. In 1557 he was called up to London on the charge of robbing his kinsman Sir Edward Warner after breaking into his house at night. However, he was not severely punished. In January 1558, the Privy Council ordered his father to send a hundred men to Dover under one of his sons, "so as it be not Thomas".

Brooke was briefly a Member of the Parliament of England for Rochester in 1559, probably thanks to the influence of his brother William, who had succeeded their father. However, he was not chosen again.

In March 1564 a government circular was sent to all the ports in the south and west of Ireland, ordering his capture. The charge was that while cruising in the English Channel, he had pursued a Spanish ship carrying tapestries for Philip II of Spain, captured her in the Bay of Biscay, killed her master, thrown her Spanish crew overboard, and taken her as a prize to Waterford. The Spanish ambassador, Diego Guzmán de Silva, and the owners of the cargo complained to the English government, and Brooke was arrested. He claimed benefit of clergy, claimed he had put the ship's crew ashore at Belle Ile, and was acquitted. In August 1564 he sailed with John Hawkins for Guinea and the Portuguese Indies, but in May 1565 he was arrested in London, charged with piracy. According to one report, Queen Elizabeth was "minded to punish ill factors, by the example of Mr. Cobham, who is condemned to die, being a gentleman". He again escaped, but by 1571 was again accused of piracy.

In the meantime, Brooke had become mixed up in the Duke of Norfolk’s plot, working for the John Lesley, Bishop of Ross, Mary Stuart's ambassador, and under torture a servant of Lesley gave evidence against him. It is unclear when he was arrested, but after the Ridolfi plot of 1571 he was again sent to the Tower of London, and the piracy commissioners were ordered to report on his seafaring career. He was kept in the Tower until April 1574, when he was released on sureties. In 1575 he was in dispute with the port of Dover about goods he claimed, and in November 1576 the Privy Council of England once more ordered his arrest on a charge of piracy. By this time, however, he was thought to have left England for Flanders. A letter dated 22 October 1578 from William Fleetwood, Recorder of London, to Burghley, the Secretary of State, reported that Brooke had died.
