= Thomas Parr (courtier) =

English courtier and official

Sir Thomas Parr
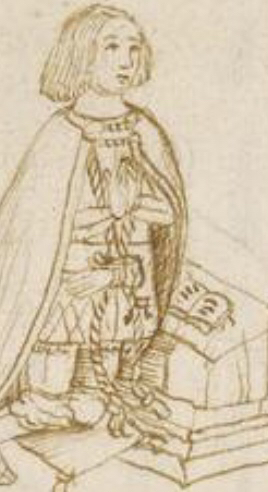
- Close-up of Thomas in a sketch of the Parr tomb at St. Anne's, Blackfriars Church.
- Born: c. 1478; Kendal Castle, Kendal, Westmorland, England
- Died: 12 November 1517; Blackfriars, London
- Buried: Blackfriars Church, London, England
- Spouse: Maud Green
- Issue: Catherine, Queen of England and Ireland; William Parr, 1st Marquess of Northampton; Anne Parr, Countess of Pembroke
- Father: Sir William Parr
- Mother: Elizabeth FitzHugh

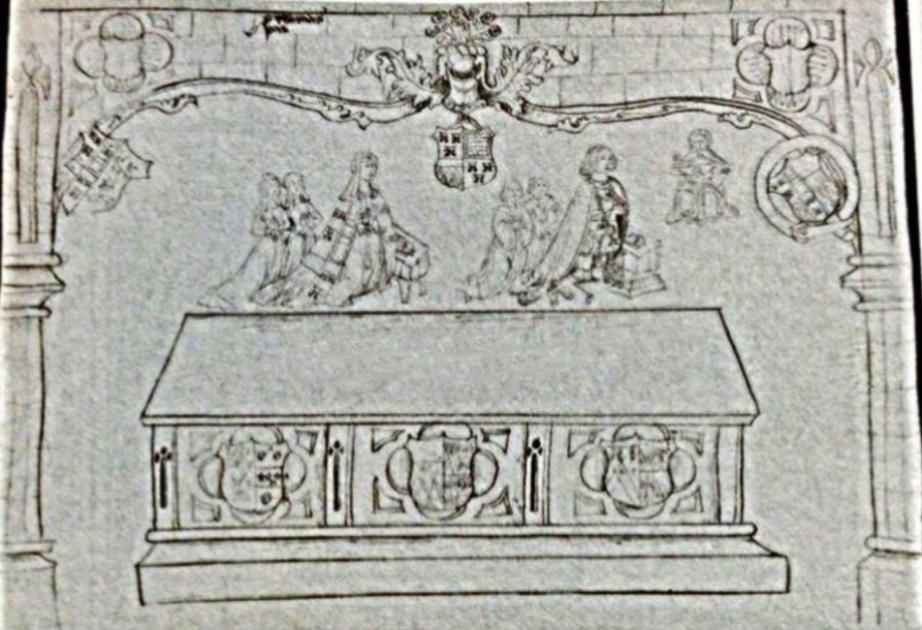
Drawing of the Parr tomb illustrating Thomas Parr, and his wife Maud Green kneeling with their children at St. Anne's, Blackfriars, London which was later destroyed.

Sir Thomas Parr (1478 – 11 November 1517) of Kendal in Westmorland (now Cumbria), England, was a courtier and is best known as the father of Queen Catherine Parr, the sixth and final wife of King Henry VIII.

== Early life and family ==
Thomas was the eldest son of Sir William Parr and Elizabeth FitzHugh. He descended from King Edward III of England through his mother, Elizabeth. Thomas's paternal grandparents were Sir Thomas Parr of Kendal and Alice Tunstall. His maternal grandparents were Sir Henry FitzHugh, 5th Baron FitzHugh of Ravensworth Castle and Lady Alice Neville, daughter of Richard Neville, 5th Earl of Salisbury and Alice Montacute, 5th Countess of Salisbury. The Earl and Countess were parents to "Warwick, the Kingmaker" who was influential in the War of the Roses. The 5th Earl of Salisbury was the son of Lady Joan Beaufort, daughter of John of Gaunt, 1st Duke of Lancaster, son of Edward III.

Thomas had three siblings, and three half siblings. They were:

- Anne Parr (d. 1513), who married Sir Thomas Cheney of Irthlingborough. Their daughter Elizabeth married Thomas Vaux, 2nd Baron Vaux of Harrowden, son of Nicholas Vaux, 1st Baron Vaux of Harrowden by his second wife, Anne Green. This Anne was sister of Maud Green, who married Anne's brother Thomas Parr (below), meaning Anne Green was both aunt and mother-in-law to Elizabeth.
- William Parr, 1st Baron Parr of Horton (c. 1483 – 1547), the second son, was knighted on 25 October 1513, was sheriff of Northamptonshire in 1518 and 1522 and, after his niece Katherine Parr's promotion to queen consort, he became her chamberlain. On 23 December 1543 he was created Baron Parr of Horton, Northamptonshire. He died on 10 September 1547 and was buried at Horton (for his tomb, see Bridges, Northamptonshire, i. 370). By Mary, daughter of Sir William Salisbury, he left four daughters.
- John Parr (d. 8 September 1508), married Constance, daughter of Sir Henry Vere of Addington, Surrey. They had no issue.

After the death of his father, his mother married Sir Nicholas Vaux as his first wife. They had the following children:

- Katherine Vaux (c. 1490 – c. 1571), married Sir George Throckmorton of Coughton and had issue.
- Alice Vaux (d. 1543), married Sir Richard Sapcote c. 1501. They had at least one child, Anne.
- Anne Vaux, married Sir Thomas Lestrange (1493–1545) and had issue.

== Education ==
Thomas' forebears, the Parrs of Kendal, were a down-to-earth northern landed gentry family. They had been, after the Crown, the most influential presence in southern Westmoreland since 1381. His mother and grandmother had been royal ladies-in-waiting, and this enabled Thomas to acquire a polished upbringing at the English court.

According to biographer Susan James, the young Thomas most likely studied under Maurice Westbury of Oxford, learning (among other things) classical Greek and Latin as well as modern languages. Westbury had been installed as a teacher by Lady Margaret Beaufort at her estate of Collyweston, Northamptonshire.

It was at Collyweston that certain gentlemen, including the son of the Earl of Westmoreland, not only received an education but also acquired political connections that would prove useful in their future careers. Thomas' father, the first Baron Parr of Kendal, had once been Lady Margaret Beaufort's revisionary heir to her substantial lands in Westmoreland, known as the Richmond fee. Thomas's mother's family by her second marriage to Sir Nicholas Vaux (later 1st Baron Vaux of Harrowden) were also close to Margaret, enjoying a long-term relationship with her.

Sir Thomas More's first wife, Jane, was a niece of Parr by marriage, thereby making More a kinsman of his. Parr was fond of More – the future but ill-fated Lord Chancellor of the kingdom – and respected his intellect. He was also an advocate of the teachings of his erudite cousin, Sir Cuthbert Tunstall. These teachings embraced the discipline of mathematics, which Thomas' daughter Catherine put to good use in her later capacity as the lady of a succession of important households.

Under the rule of King Henry VIII, the Parr family flourished. Their influence, income, and titles increased as Thomas' career advanced. He became a Master of the Wards and was appointed Master of the Guards and Comptroller to the King. He was knighted and made High Sheriff of Northamptonshire in 1509, and of Lincolnshire in 1510. His wife, Maud, became a lady-in-waiting to Queen Catherine of Aragon. Shortly before the birth of their first surviving child, Catherine, the couple had bought a house in Blackfriars, London. Sir Thomas was popular with Henry and, as we have seen, served at court with Sir Thomas More. Although rich in land and money, Sir Thomas never attained the aristocratic title of baron. He did, however, hold messuages, lands, woods, and rents in Parr, Wigan, and Sutton, as well as the manor of Thurnham.

== Marriage and issue ==
Thomas Parr married Maud Green (6 April 1492 – 1 December 1531), daughter of Sir Thomas Green, in 1508. Before the birth of their most famous offspring, Catherine, Maud gave birth to a son. This occurred not long after Maud and Thomas' marriage. Their happiness at the birth proved short lived as the baby soon died and his name remains unknown. After the birth of their fourth child, Anne, Maud fell pregnant again – in circa 1517, the year of her husband's death. The child, however, either miscarried or was stillborn, or succumbed in very early infancy to an illness.

The surviving children of Sir Thomas and Maud were:

- Catherine Parr (1512–5 September 1548), Queen Consort of England and Ireland, who wedded:
  - Sir Edward Burgh, 1529 at Gainsborough, Lincolnshire, England.
  - John Nevill, 3rd Baron Latimer, 1534 in London, Middlesex, England.
  - King Henry VIII, 12 July 1543 at Hampton Court Palace in the private oratory of the Queen's Closet.
  - Sir Thomas Seymour on 4 April 1547. Had issue: Mary Seymour.
- William Parr, 1st Marquess of Northampton (c. 1513–28 October 1571). He married three times, all without issue:
  - Anne Bourchier, 7th Baroness Bourchier
  - Elizabeth Brooke
  - Helena Snakenborg.
- Anne Parr, Countess of Pembroke (c. 1515–20 February 1552), married in 1538, William Herbert, 1st Earl of Pembroke, by whom she had two sons and a daughter.
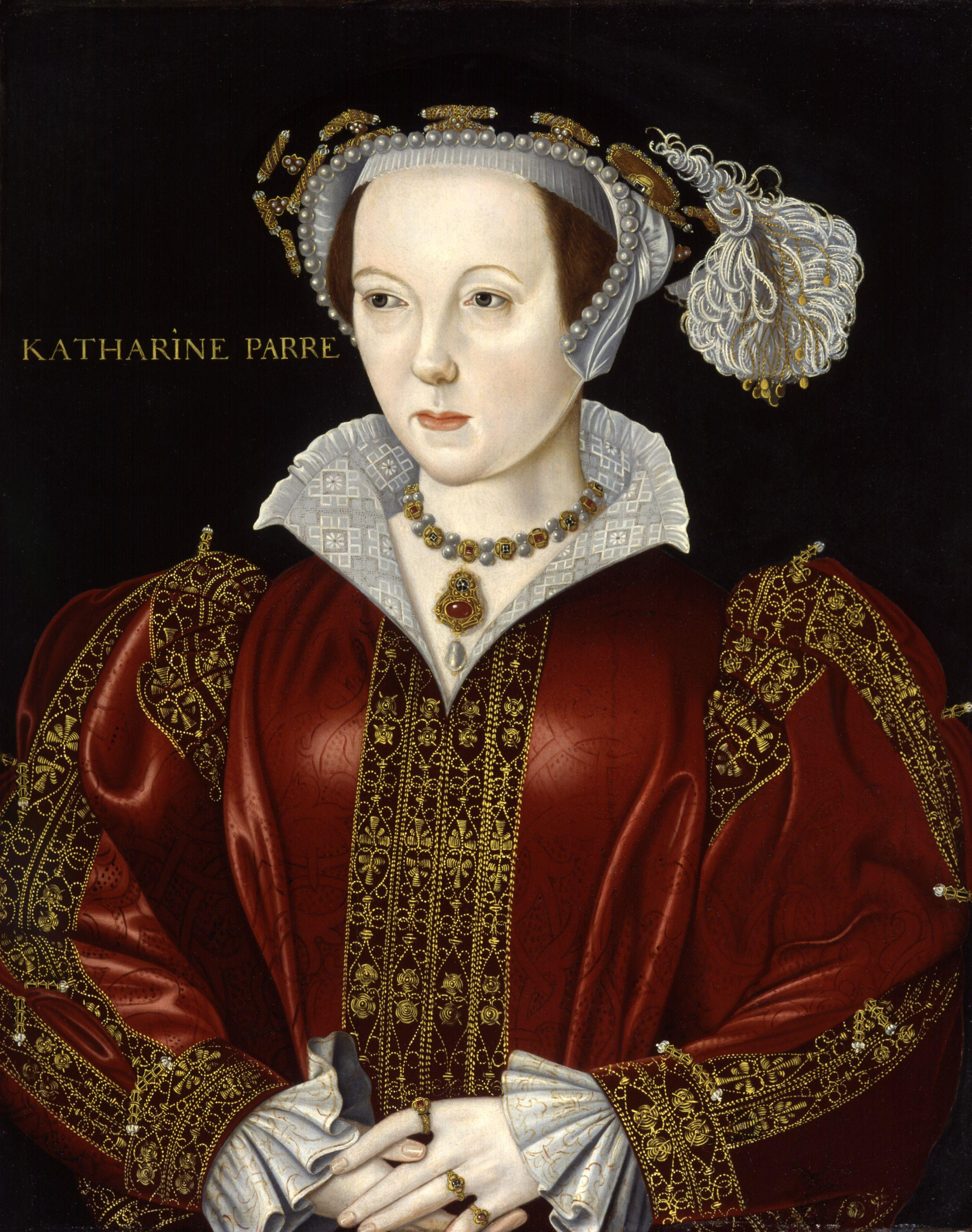
Catherine Parr, sixth Queen of Henry VIII.

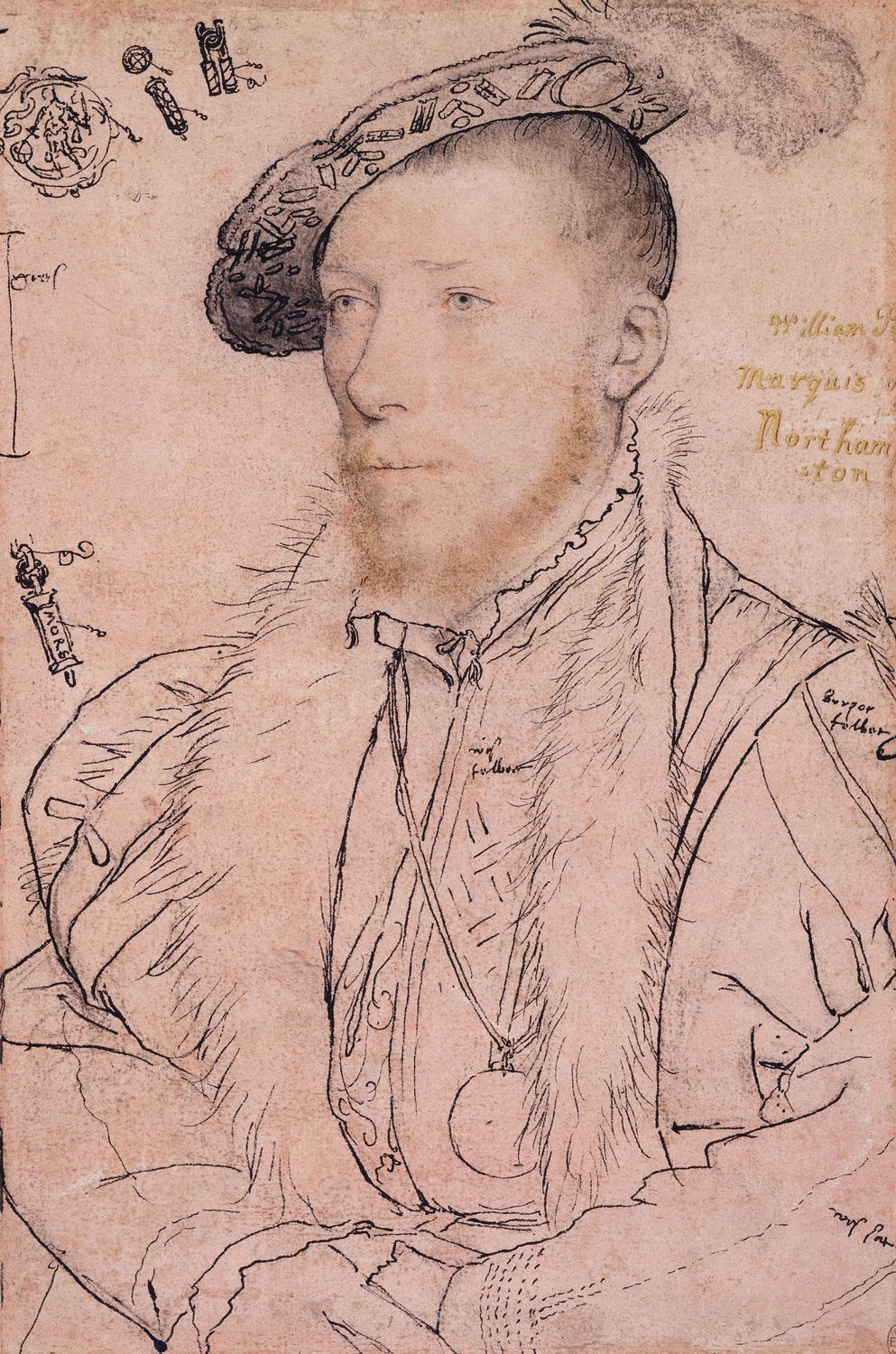
William Parr.

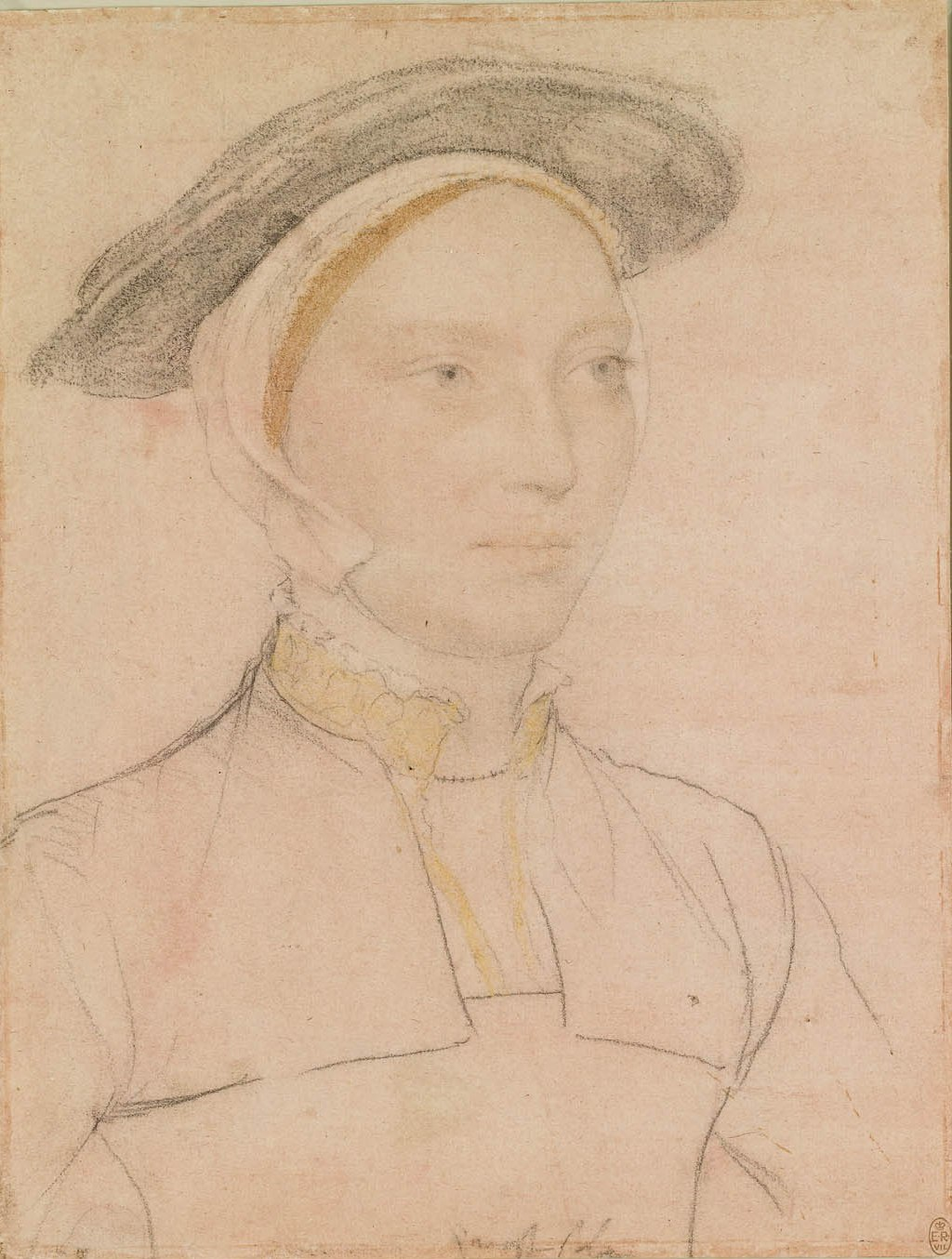
Anne Parr, Countess of Pembroke.

== Death ==
Sir Thomas fell seriously ill in November 1517. He compiled a will which made provision for his wife and children. The two female children were to receive dowries while the bulk of the estate was to be inherited by his only male child, William. Because Sir Thomas died before any of his children were of age, Maud – together with Sir Cuthbert Tunstall, the children's uncle Sir William Parr, and a Dr. Melton – were made executors.

Sir Thomas died in his home at Blackfriars, London, on 11 November 1517. He was interred in St Anne's Church, Blackfriars, within an elaborate tomb. His widow was later buried beside him.

== Ancestry ==
Ancestors of Thomas Parr (courtier)

16. Sir William Parr
8. Sir John Parr
17. Elizabeth Ros
4. Sir Thomas Parr of Kendal
18. Sir Thomas de Crophull
9. Agnes Crophull
19. Sybil de la Bere
2. Sir William Parr of Kendal
20. Sir William de Tunstall
10. Sir Thomas of Thurland Tunstall
21. Alice Lindsay
5. Alice Tunstall
22. Sir Nicholas of Farleton Harrington
11. Isabel Harrington
23. Isabel English
1. Sir Thomas Parr (1478–1517)
24. Henry FitzHugh, 3rd Baron FitzHugh
12. William FitzHugh, 4th Baron FitzHugh
25. Elizabeth of Codnor Grey
6. Henry FitzHugh, 5th Baron FitzHugh
26. William Willoughby, 5th Baron Willoughby de Eresby
13. Hon. Marjory Willoughby
27. Lucy Le Strange
3. Elizabeth FitzHugh
28. Ralph de Neville, 1st Earl of Westmorland
14. Richard Neville, 5th Earl of Salisbury
29. Lady Joan Beaufort, Countess of Westmoreland
7. Lady Alice Neville
30. Thomas Montacute, 4th Earl of Salisbury
15. Lady Alice Montacute, 5th Countess of Salisbury
31. Lady Eleanor Holland, Countess of Salisbury
