= Henry Cobham (diplomat) =

16th-century English politician

Sir Henry Cobham (1537–1592) was an English diplomat.

== Life ==
The fifth son of George Brooke, 9th Baron Cobham, he was always known as, and signed himself, Henry Cobham. He went to Spain with Sir Thomas Chaloner the elder who was accredited as ambassador resident at Madrid in 1561, returning to England the same year with despatches. In 1567 he carried letters from Elizabeth I to Maximilian II, Holy Roman Emperor and the Archduke Charles at Vienna, when the queen hoped to reopen the negotiations for her marriage with the archduke, and returned with a negative answer.

In 1570 Cobham was sent to Antwerp, ostensibly on a mission of courtesy, but really to ascertain the destination of the fleet which the Duke of Alva was then equipping. He went on to Speyer, where he had audience of the Emperor (17 September), and went via Paris to Spain, accredited to Philip II as an envoy extraordinary. His instructions were to demand the release of the English ships seized by Alva in alleged retaliation for depredations committed by English privateers, and the expulsion of English Catholic refugees from Spain.

Cobham in Madrid was barely admitted to an audience of Philip, and then was immediately referred to the council. On his attempting to argue that Alva was the aggressor, De Feria suggested that he was not speaking the truth, and Cardinal Diego de Espinosa suggested that Elizabeth ought first to restore Spanish treasure taken by the privateers. Cobham then returned to England. He was knighted at Kenilworth in the summer of 1575, and in the autumn was again sent to Madrid, this time to demand religious toleration for English subjects resident and travelling in Spain, and liberty for English ambassadors resident to use the forms of the English church in their own houses; and to make an offer of mediation between Philip and the Netherlands. Alva undertook on his own responsibility to secure relaxation of the laws against heretics in favour of English residents. The proffered mediation was rejected. On his return to England, Cobham was shortly despatched to Brussels, to threaten Luis de Requesens y Zúñiga with war if he proceeded further with coercive measures; but Requesens died before Cobham could deliver the message.

In 1579 Cobham succeeded Sir Amyas Paulet as ambassador resident at Paris. He was instructed:

- to negotiate for a joint expedition to place Don Antonio on the throne of Portugal;
- to require the establishment of a court for the relief of English subjects injured by the depredations of French privateers; and
- to temporise in the matter of the proposed marriage of Queen Elizabeth with the Duke of Alençon.

He was joined by John Somers and Francis Walsingham in 1581, when the three ambassadors urged the substitution of a "league of amity" for the match. In January 1582, Cobham described the French courtiers of Catherine de' Medici admiring a portrait of Elizabeth I which showed her dressed "à la Françoise" in clothes embroidered with pearls. He remained at Paris until 1583, when he was recalled.

Cobham represented Kent in the parliaments of 1586 and 1589, and was a member of the "privy council of the house" and committees. He died in 1592 at Sutton-at-Hone.

== Family ==
Cobham married Anne, daughter of Sir Henry Sutton of Nottinghamshire, widow of Walter Haddon by whom he had three sons. Of these the second became John Brooke, 1st Baron Cobham, but by his death without issue the title became extinct.
