= William Parr, Marquess of Northampton =

English nobleman and politician

The Marquess of Northampton
- Earl of Essex; Baron Parr of Kendal; Baron Hart
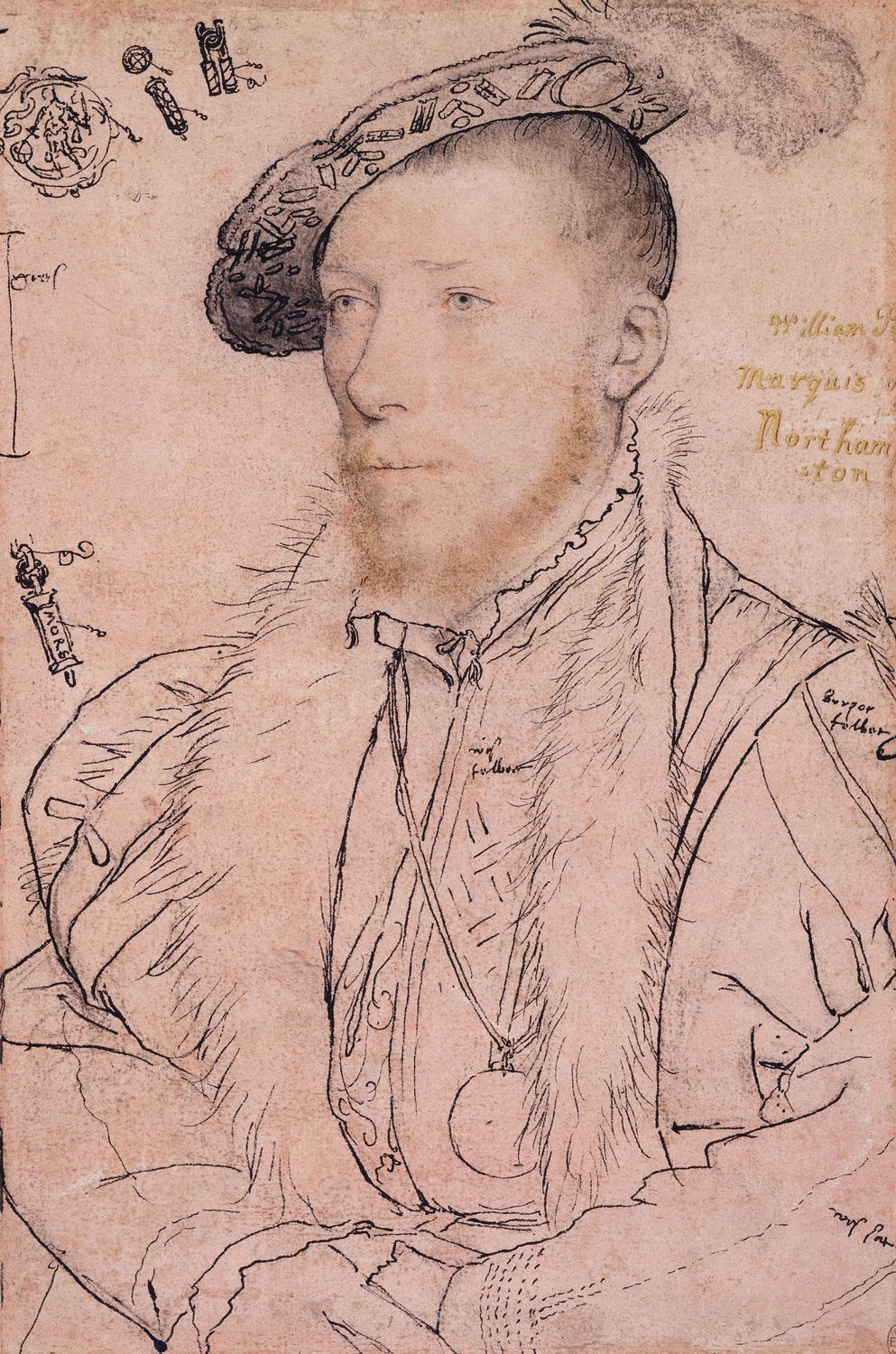
- Portrait by Hans Holbein the Younger, royal collection, Windsor Castle
- Born: 14 August 1513; Blackfriars, London, England
- Died: 27 October 1571 (aged 58); Warwick, England
- Buried: St. Mary's Collegiate Church, Warwick, England
- Spouses: Lady Anne Bourchier (annulled); Elisabeth Brooke; Helena Snakenborg
- Father: Sir Thomas Parr
- Mother: Maud Green

Arms of Parr: Argent, two bars azure a bordure engrailed sable

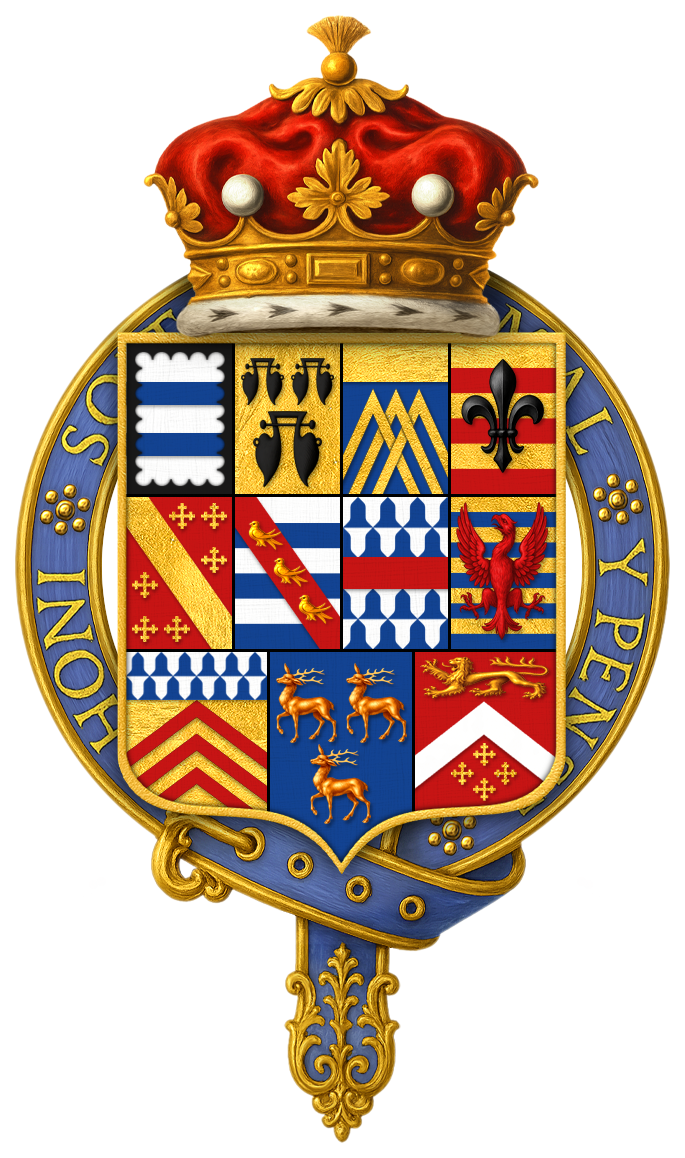
Quartered arms of Sir William Parr, Marquess of Northampton, KG, displaying his ancestry

William Parr, Marquess of Northampton (14 August 1513 – 28 October 1571), was the only brother of Katherine Parr, the sixth and final wife of King Henry VIII. He was a "sincere, plain, direct man, not crafty nor involved", whose "delight was music and poetry and his exercise war" who co-authored a treatise on hare coursing. He was in favour with Henry VIII and his son Edward VI, under whom he was the leader of the Protestant party, but having supported the desire of the latter to be succeeded by the Protestant Lady Jane Grey, was attainted by Edward's Catholic half-sister, Queen Mary I. He was restored by her Protestant half-sister, Queen Elizabeth I.

== Origins ==
He was the only son and heir of the courtier Sir Thomas Parr (d. 1517) of Kendal in Westmorland, by his wife Maud Green (d. 1531) a daughter and co-heiress of Sir Thomas Green of Boughton and Greens Norton in Northamptonshire and his wife Joan Fogge. His younger sister was Anne Parr (1515–1552) wife of William Herbert, 1st Earl of Pembroke (c.1501–1570).

== Career ==
His father died in 1517 when William was aged 4 and he became a ward of King Henry VIII, from whom his mother re-purchased his marriage, at great expense. Parr took part in suppressing the rising in the North of England in 1537, when he attracted the favourable notice of Thomas Howard, 3rd Duke of Norfolk (uncle of both Anne Boleyn and Katherine Howard), encouraging his uncle Sir William Parr (c.1483–1547) of Horton, Northamptonshire, to obtain a place for him as a courtier in the King's Privy Chamber. After serving as a Member of Parliament for Northamptonshire he was created Baron Parr ("of Kendal") in 1539. On 23 April 1543, he became a Knight of the Garter. On 23 December 1543, just after his sister had married the king, he was created Earl of Essex, a title held by his late father-in-law Henry Bourchier, 2nd Earl of Essex, who had died without male issue in March 1540. In 1544 he joined the Privy Council attending the first meeting on 5 February 1544.

He was King Edward VI's "beloved uncle" (in fact step-uncle, being the brother of that king's step-mother) and one of the most important men at Edward's court, and the leader of the Protestant party, especially during the time of John Dudley, 1st Duke of Northumberland's time as leader of the government. Parr served as Lord Lieutenant in 1549 of five of the eastern counties (Cambridgeshire, Huntingdonshire, Bedfordshire, Northamptonshire and Norfolk), of Surrey in 1551, of Berkshire and Oxfordshire in 1552 and of Hertfordshire and Buckinghamshire in 1553. He served as Lord Great Chamberlain from 1550 to 1553, in which role in 1551 he welcomed Mary of Guise, Regent of Scotland, to Hampton Court Palace on behalf of the King.

Parr, and especially his wife, were leaders in the attempt to put the Protestant Lady Jane Grey (daughter-in-law of Northumberland) on the throne after Edward's death (as that king had desired) in place of the other contender his half-sister the Roman Catholic Queen Mary. However his attempt failed and after the accession of Mary I in 1553 he was convicted of high treason, was attainted and sentenced to death on 18 August 1553. However he was released within a few months and following the accession of the Protestant Queen Elizabeth I, his titles were restored in 1559. He became a Knight of the Garter again on 24 April 1559.

== Marriages ==
He married thrice:

- Firstly, on 9 February 1527 (aged 13) at the chapel of Stanstead Hall in Essex, to Anne Bourchier, suo jure 7th Baroness Bourchier (d. 26 January 1571), only child and heiress of Henry Bourchier, 2nd Earl of Essex (d. 1540). Parr's mother had expended great sums to arrange the marriage, as she noted in her will. In 1542, she eloped from him, stating that "she would live as she lusted". On 17 April 1543, their marriage was annulled by an act of Parliament, Lady Parr's Children Illegitimacy Act 1542 (34 & 35 Hen. 8. c. 43 Pr.), and any of her children "born during esposels between Lord and Lady Parr" were declared bastards. Parr also obtained his ex-wife's lands and he was created Earl of Essex on 23 December 1543. She predeceased Parr by only 9 months, having been awarded after her divorce a few of her father's former estates by Queen Mary.
- Secondly, in 1548, he married Elisabeth Brooke (1526–1565), a daughter of George Brooke, 9th Baron Cobham of Cobham Hall in Kent, by his wife Anne Bray. Their marriage was declared valid in 1548, invalid in 1553, and valid again in 1558.

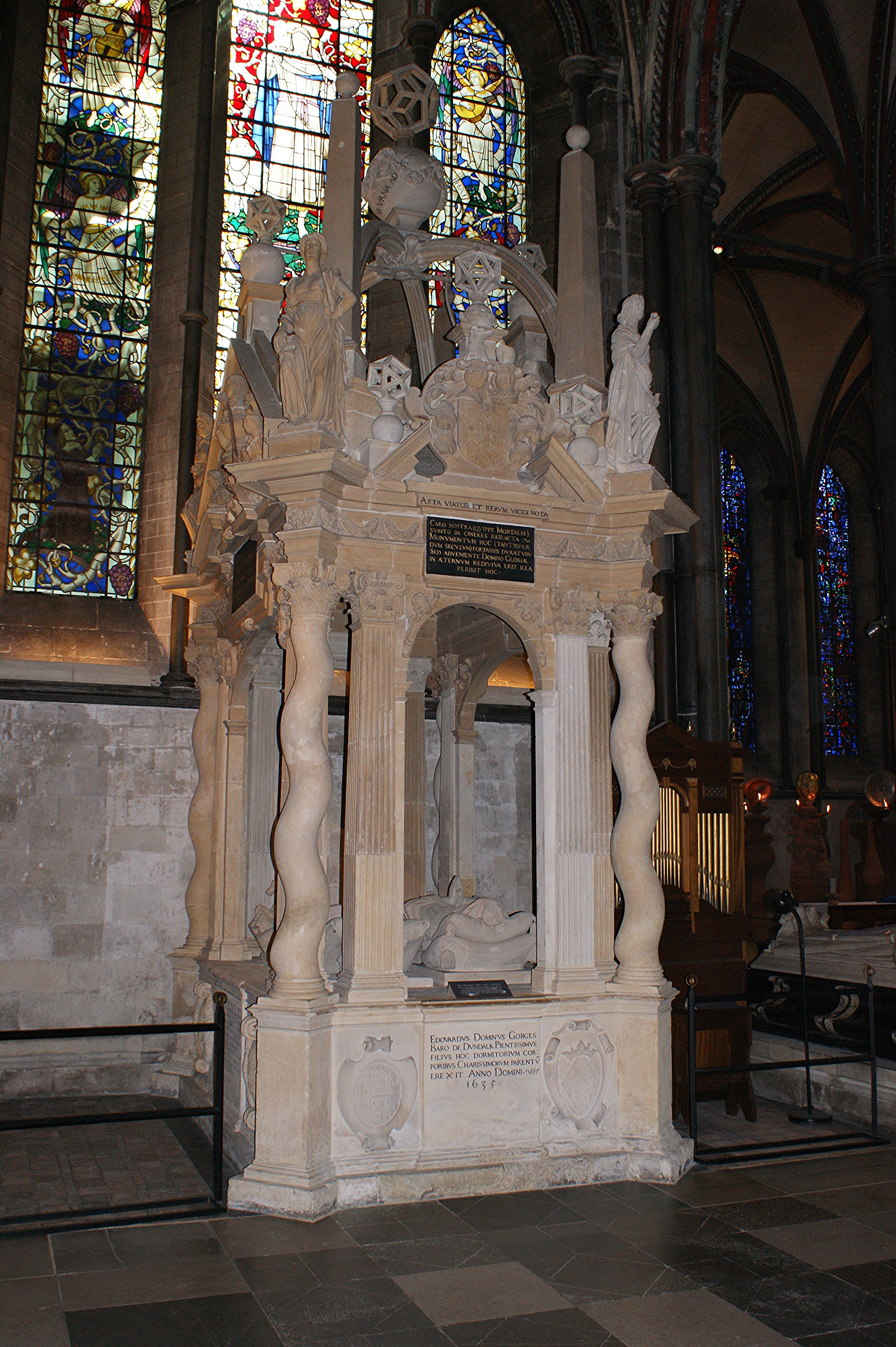
Monument and effigies, in Salisbury Cathedral, Wiltshire, of Sir Thomas Gorges (1536-1610) of Longford Castle and his wife Helena Snakenborg (d.1635), third wife and widow of William Parr, Marquess of Northampton

- Thirdly, in May 1571 (five months before his death), he married Helena Snakenborg (d. 1635), First Lady of the Privy Chamber to Queen Elizabeth I, who had come to England from Sweden in 1565 in the train of Cecilia, Margravine of Baden. In 1580, she remarried to Sir Thomas Gorges (1536–1610) of Longford Castle in Wiltshire, by whom she had issue, and was buried with her husband in Salisbury Cathedral, Wiltshire, where survives their impressive monument with recumbent effigies.

== Death and burial ==
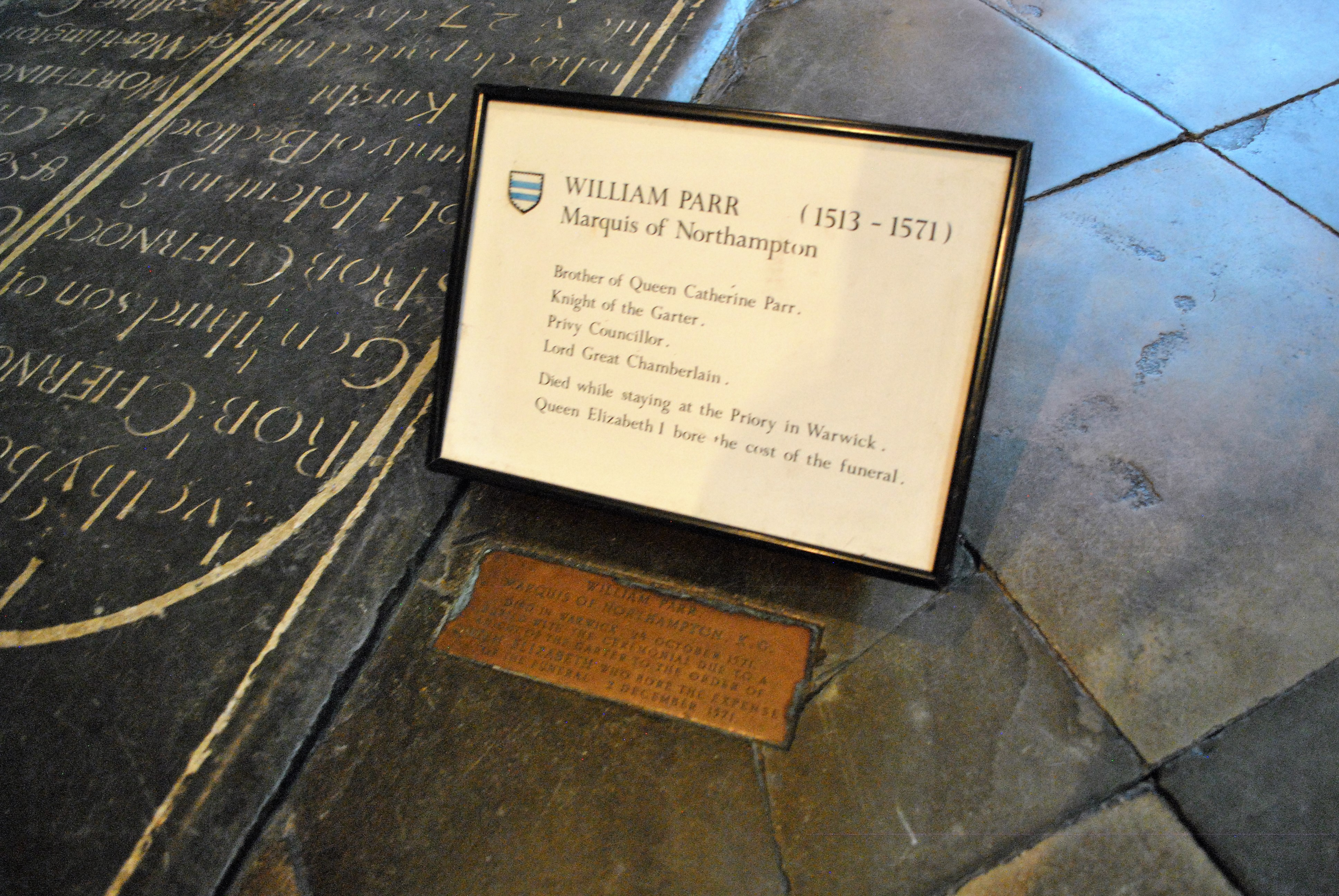
Ledger stone of William Parr, Marquess of Northampton, Collegiate Church of St. Mary, Warwick

He died on 28 October 1571 at Warwick Priory, without issue, when his only surviving title of Marquess of Northampton became extinct. He was buried in the chancel of the Collegiate Church of St. Mary, Warwick. Queen Elizabeth I paid for his funeral and burial. His surviving ledger stone is inscribed: William Parr, Marquis of Northampton; Died in Warwick 28 October 1571. [Buried] with the ceremonial due [of a] Knight of the Garter to the Order of Queen Elizabeth who bore the expense of the funeral, 2 December 1571.

== See also ==
- Attainder of Duke of Northumberland and others Act 1553

Political offices
Preceded by The Earl of Bedford	Lord Lieutenant of Buckinghamshire; 1553–1559	Succeeded by The Duke of Norfolk
Honorary titles
Preceded by The Lord Braye	Captain of the Gentlemen Pensioners; 1550–1553	Succeeded by The Earl of Sussex
