= Garter stall plate =

Artwork in St George's Chapel, Windsor Castle

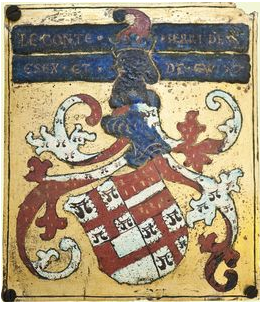
Garter stall plate of Henry Bourchier, 2nd Earl of Essex (d.1540), nominated 1499, showing his name, titles and heraldic achievement

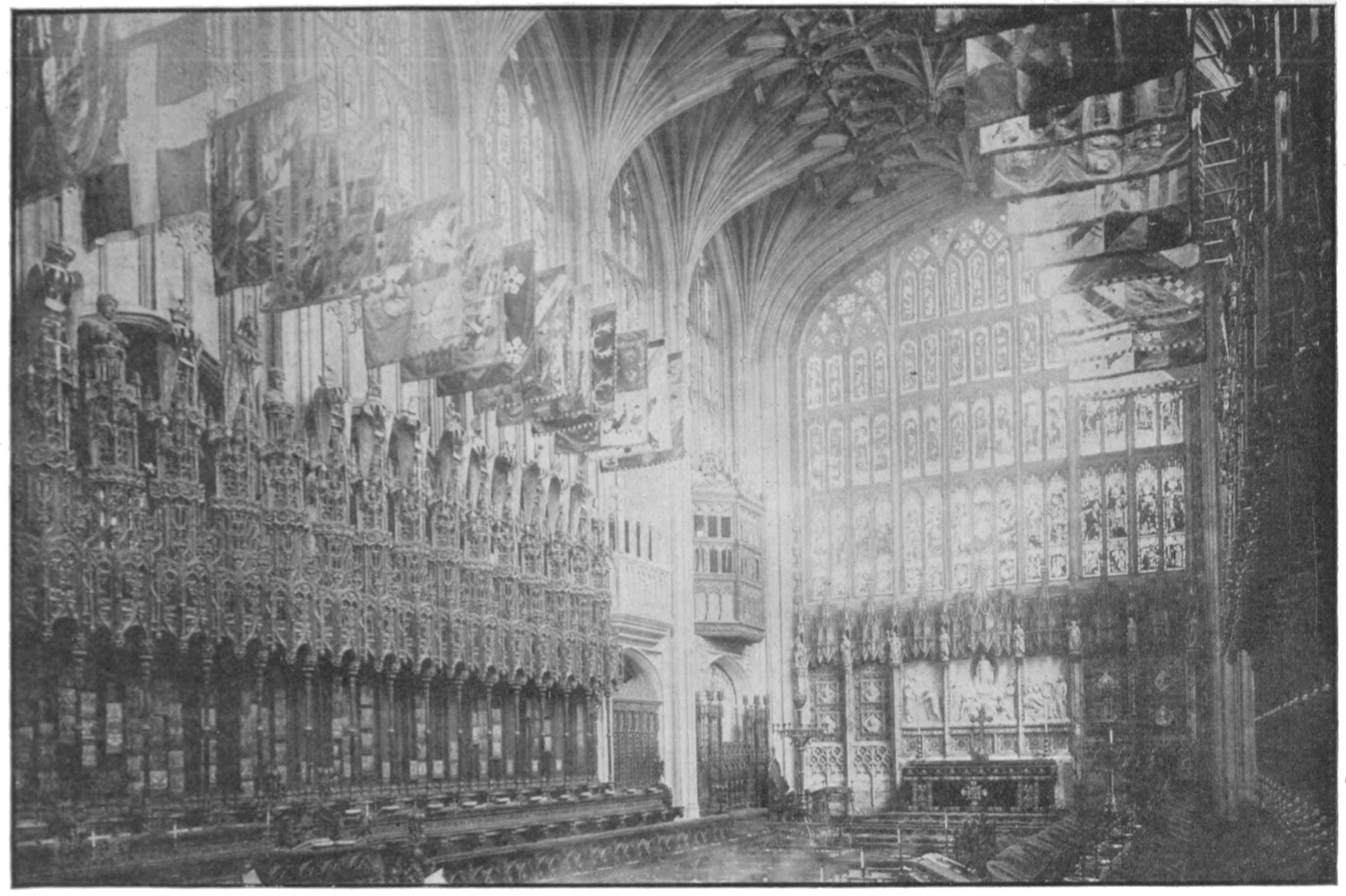
Stalls of Knights of the Garter in St George's Chapel. The Garter stall plates are visible affixed to the rear panelling of each stall

Garter stall plates are small enamelled brass plates located in St George's Chapel, Windsor Castle, displaying the names and arms of the Knights of the Garter. Each knight is allotted a stall in St George's Chapel and the stall plate is affixed to his personal stall. His successor knight in that stall adds his own stall plate and thus a fairly complete series of stall plates survives for the successive occupants of each stall. Many other ancient European orders of chivalry use similar stall plates in the home church or other building of their order.

== Significance ==
Stall plates are important for several reasons. They are works of art in their own right which demonstrate the skills of medieval and later metal workers and enamellers. They are an extremely valuable source to students of heraldry, as they show contemporary images of ancient arms the provenance and reliability of which is second to none. Unlike the ancient seals which often survive, stall plates show not only the form of the arms but generally also the tinctures (colours).

Stall plates contain inscriptions which were used as evidence during legal disputes concerning devolution of peerage titles. However, as was demonstrated by J. Horace Round, the stall plates from about the mid-16th century frequently were inscribed with titles which were not legally held by the knight, but were merely ornate styles — frequently baronies which had never existed or were not theirs by right. The question addressed by Round was whether such styles inscribed on a Garter stall plate could form legal evidence in a court of law to prove that the knight had legally held the title recited on his stall plate. Before the 21st century and the curtailment of a peer's right to a seat in parliament, such issues were of great importance. An example of such a case was that of 1912 concerning the Barony of Furnivall. The appellant proposed in support of her claim that the stall plate of Henry, Duke of Norfolk (1655–1701), KG, nominated to the Order in 1685, was inscribed with the style of "Lord Furnivall". She herself was descended from the Duke. Similarly in 1692 Henry, Earl of Suffolk (1627–1709) had made a claim to the Barony of Howard de Walden based on the evidence from three Garter stall plates which purported to show that baronies by writ did not pass away with heirs general but were retained by the heir male, if he were an earl, with his earldom. This is known as the "Doctrine of Attraction", namely that an earldom attracts a barony.

== Regulation ==
King Henry VIII (1509–1547) made a statute of the Order of the Garter relating to stall plates as follows:

"It is agreed that every knyght within the yere of his stallation shall cause to be made a scauchon of his armes and hachementis in a plate of metall suche as shall please him and that it shall be surely sett upon the back of his stall. And the other that shall come after shall have their scochons and hachements in like manner; but their plates of metall nor their hachements shall not be soo large nor soo greatte as they of the first Founders were excepte strangers which may use their plates and fashions at their pleasure"

== Gallery ==
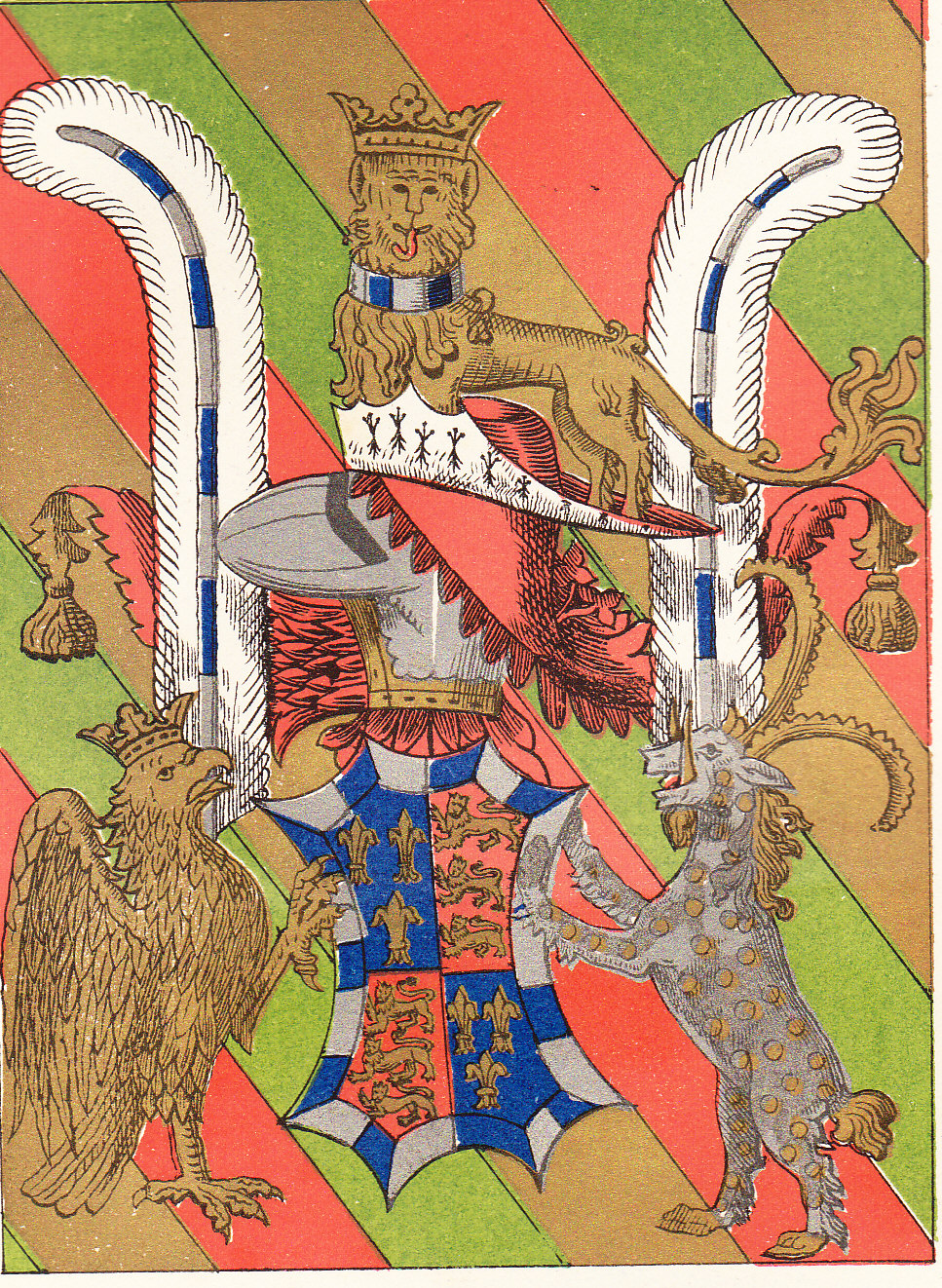
John Beaufort, 1st Duke of Somerset (1403–1444)

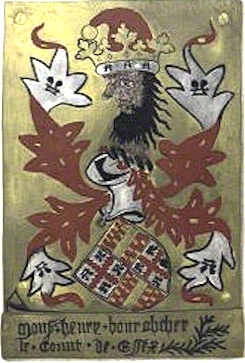
Henry Bourchier, 1st Earl of Essex (c.1405–1483)

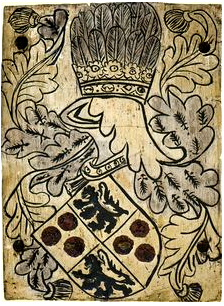
Edward Courtenay, 1st Earl of Devon (d. 1509)

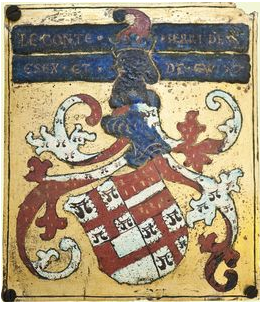
Henry Bourchier, 2nd Earl of Essex (d. 1540)

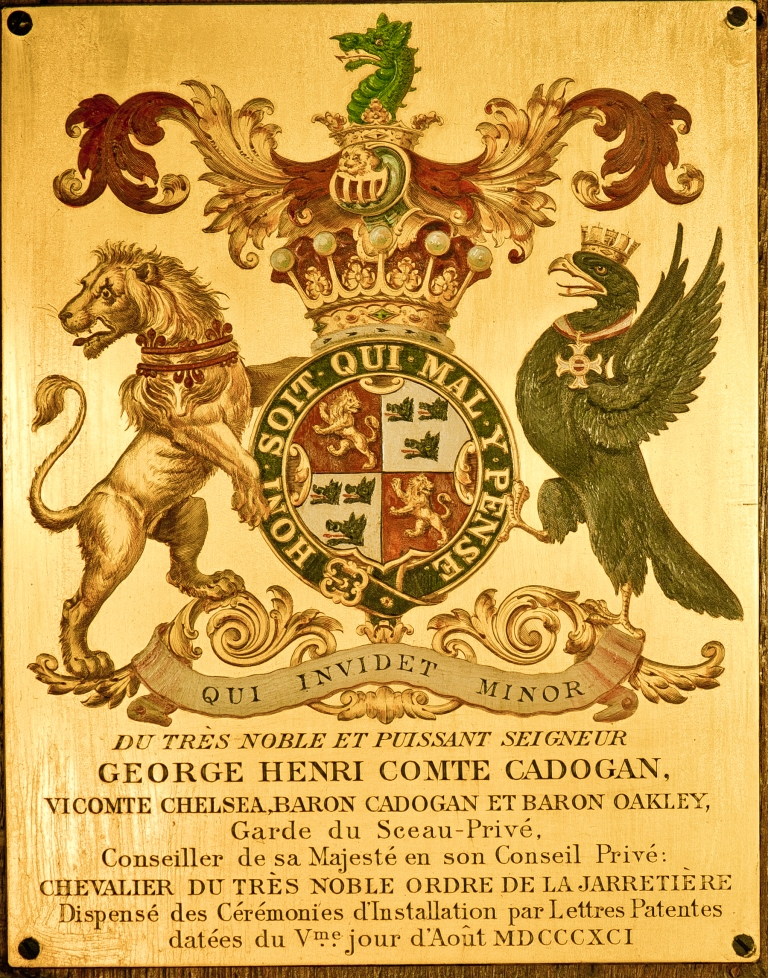
George Cadogan, 5th Earl Cadogan (1840–1915)

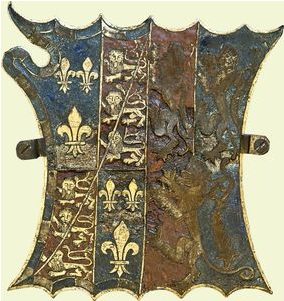
Charles Somerset, 1st Earl of Worcester (c. 1460–1526)

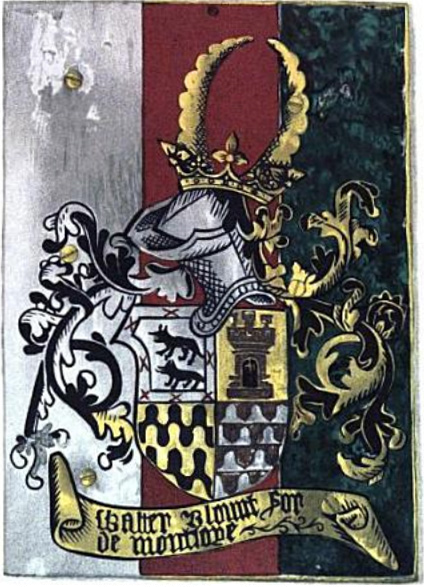
Walter Blount, 1st Baron Mountjoy (c. 1416–1474)

== Sources ==
- Royal Collection, Special Feature: The Knights of the Garter Under Henry VIII
- Round, J. Horace, Family Origins and Other Studies, Page, William, (ed.), London, 1930, pp.174-189, The Garter Plates and Peerage Styles
