= Achievement (heraldry) =

Full display of coat of arms

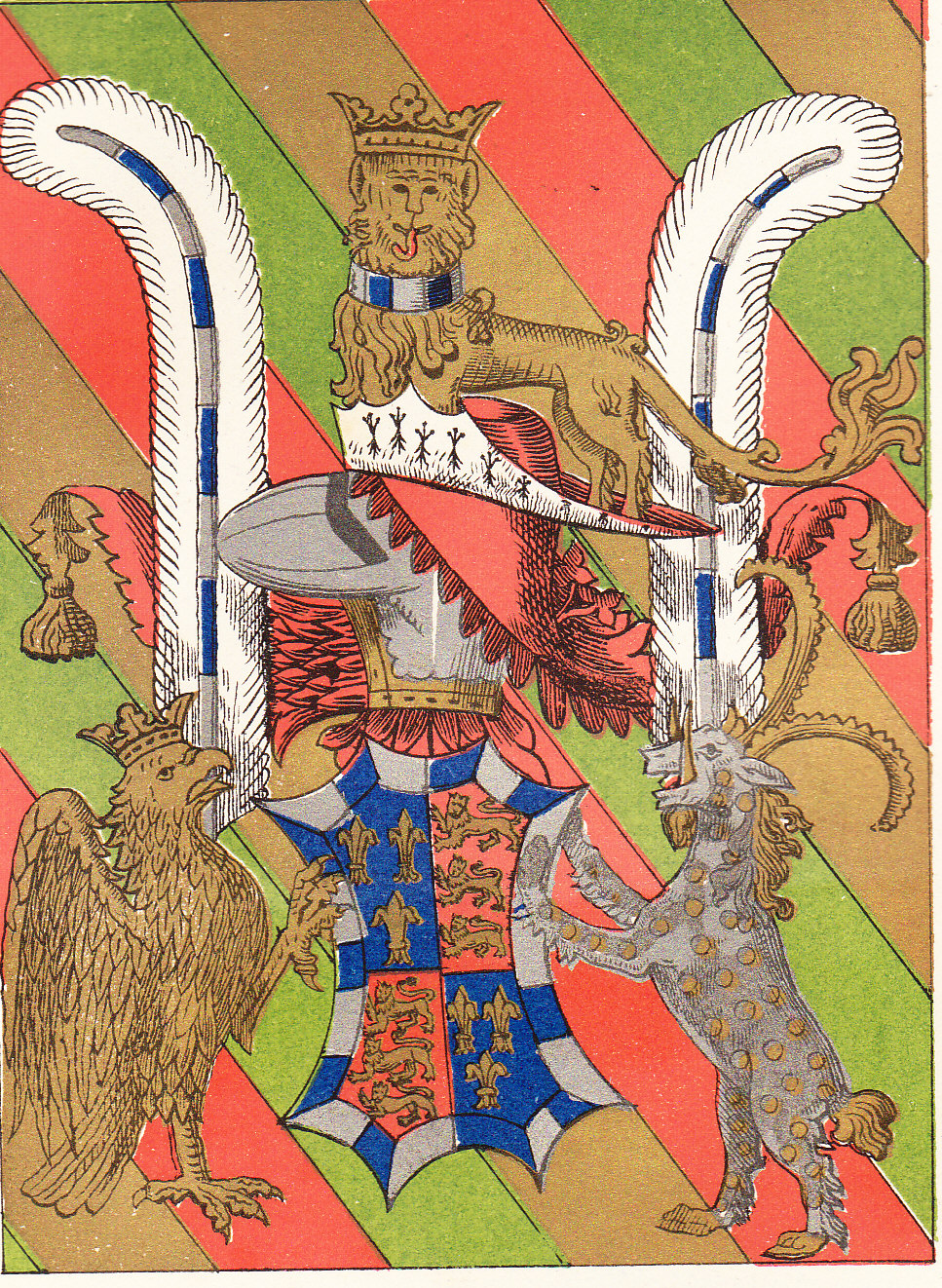
Heraldic achievement forming the Garter stall plate of John Beaufort, 1st Duke of Somerset (d. 1444), KG, St. George's Chapel, Windsor. The earliest garter plate with supporters, it includes the badge of an ostrich feather, here shown as a pair, blazoned: feather argent pen gobonne argent and azure

In heraldry, an achievement, armorial achievement or heraldic achievement (historical: hatchment) is a full display or depiction of all the heraldic components to which the bearer of a coat of arms is entitled. An achievement comprises not only the arms displayed on the escutcheon, the central element, but also the following elements surrounding it (from top to bottom):

- Slogan or war-cry, if possessed
- Mantle and pavilion
- Crest placed atop a:
- Torse (or cap of maintenance as a special honour)
- Mantling
- Helm of appropriate variety; if holder of higher rank than a baronet, issuing from a:
- Coronet or crown (not used by baronets), of appropriate variety.
- Console (decorative or aesthetic in purpose, and not officially part of the armorial grant)
- Supporters (if the bearer is entitled to them, generally in modern usage not baronets), which may stand on a compartment
- Motto, if possessed
- Order, if possessed
- Badge, if possessed

== Coat of arms ==
Sometimes the term "coat of arms" is used to refer to the full achievement, but this usage is incorrect in the strict sense of heraldic terminology, as a coat of arms refers to a garment with the escutcheon or armorial achievement embroidered on it.

== Hatchment ==
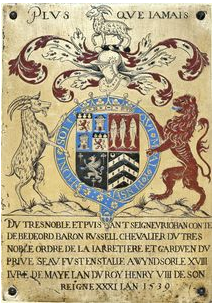
Garter stall plate of John Russell, 1st Earl of Bedford (c. 1485–1554/5), installed as a Knight of the Garter 18 May 1539, showing his "achievement", at that time termed "hatchment"

The ancient term used in place of "achievement" was "hatchment", deriving (through such historic forms as atcheament, achement, hathement, etc.) from the French achèvement, from the French verb achever, a contraction of à chef venir ("to come to a head"), ultimately from Latin ad caput venire, "to come to a head", thus: "to reach a conclusion, accomplish, achieve". The word "hatchment" in its historical usage is thus identical in meaning and origin to the English heraldic term "achievement". In modern English, however, the term "hatchment" has come to be used almost exclusively to denote a funerary hatchment, while the word "achievement", now archaic in that sense, is used in place of "hatchment" in non-funereal contexts. An example of the historic use of "hatchment" in a non-funerary context to denote what is now termed "achievement" appears in the statute of the Order of the Garter laid down by King Henry VIII (r. 1509–1547) concerning the regulation of Garter stall plates:

It is agreed that every knyght within the yere of his stallation shall cause to be made a scauchon of his armes and hachementis in a plate of metall suche as shall please him and that it shall be surely sett upon the back of his stall.
