= Henry Bourchier, 2nd Earl of Essex =

English soldier

The Right Honourable The Earl of Essex KG KB PC
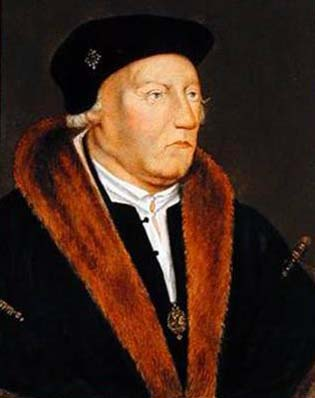
- Henry Bourchier, 2nd Earl of Essex, after 1825 watercolour portrait by Sarah Bazett (d.1838) ("Sarah, Countess of Essex"), published in "Memoirs of the Court of Queen Elizabeth", by Lucy Aikin, 1825 edition

Earl of Essex and Baron Bourchier
- Reign: 1483–1540
- Predecessor: Henry Bourchier, 1st Earl of Essex
- Successor: Essex extinct Anne Bourchier, 7th Baroness Bourchier
- Died: 13 March 1539
- Noble family: Bourchier
- Spouses: Mary Say; Mary Blount
- Issue: Anne Bourchier, 7th Baroness Bourchier
- Father: William Bourchier, Viscount Bourchier
- Mother: Anne Woodville

Henry Bourchier, 2nd Earl of Essex, 6th Baron Bourchier, 3rd Count of Eu and 2nd Viscount Bourchier (died 13 March 1539) was an English soldier, peer and courtier at the courts of Henry VII and Henry VIII. He married Mary Say, by whom he had one child, Anne, who became his heir.

== Family ==
Bourchier was the son of William Bourchier, Viscount Bourchier and Anne Woodville. He was born between 1472 and 1480. Through his mother, he was the nephew of Elizabeth Woodville and Edward IV. He inherited the titles of Earl of Essex, Baron Bourchier, Count of Eu and Viscount Bourchier from his grandfather Henry Bourchier, 1st Earl of Essex, on his death in 1483. He married twice, about 1512 to Mary Say(e) (1474-1535), then about 1536 to Mary Blount (1498-1555).

== Career ==
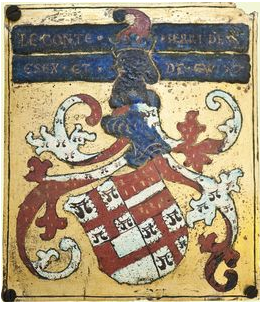
Garter stall plate of Henry Bourchier, 2nd Earl of Essex (d.1540), nominated 1499, showing his name, titles and heraldic achievement

Bourchier was a member of Henry VII's privy council. He was present at the Siege of Boulogne in 1492 and five years later led a detachment against the rebels at Blackheath. When Henry VIII became king, he was made captain of the new bodyguard.

In 1513, he commanded the cavalry vanguard at the Battle of the Spurs, where he ordered the charge which routed the French gendarmes. As Lieutenant-general of the Spears, he was subsequently present at the sieges of Terouanne and Tournai and was appointed Chief Captain of the King's forces the following year. in 1520 he was part of King Henry's entourage when he met in France with the French king at the Field of the Cloth of Gold, where he carried the Sword of State.

He was one of the judges at the trial in 1521 of Edward Stafford, 3rd Duke of Buckingham, when the latter was tried on a charge of treason. Bourchier received the manor of Bedminster as his share of the Duke's forfeited estates.

In March 1539, he broke his neck after falling from his horse and died from his injury and was buried at Little Easton church in Essex. Without male issue, his earldom and his countship became extinct. His barony was inherited by his daughter Anne.

Political offices
New office	Captain of the Gentlemen Pensioners; 1509–1539	Succeeded by Sir Anthony Browne
Peerage of England
Preceded by Henry Bourchier	Earl of Essex; 5th creation 1483–1540	Extinct
Preceded by Henry Bourchier	Baron Bourchier; 1483–1540	Succeeded by Anne Bourchier
