= Elisabeth Brooke, Marchioness of Northampton =

English noblewoman

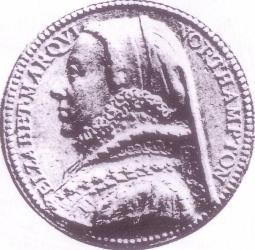
A medallion of Elizabeth Brooke, sister-in-law of Katherine Parr.

Elisabeth Brooke (25 June 1526 – 2 April 1565) was an English courtier and noblewoman. She was the eldest daughter of George Brooke, 9th Baron Cobham of Kent and Anne Braye. Her relationship with William Parr, 1st Marquess of Northampton, Katherine Parr's brother, would shape the politics of England for many years to come. As the Marchioness of Northampton, Elisabeth performed much of a queen's role during the reign of Edward VI. Her husband was instrumental in putting Lady Jane Grey on the throne. When Mary I was proclaimed queen, she imprisoned the Marquess in the Tower and stripped him of all his titles. Her first cousin, Thomas Wyatt the Younger, was the leader of a rebellion against Queen Mary known as Wyatt's Rebellion. In the reign of Elizabeth I, she became one of the most influential courtiers again.

Elisabeth was described as vivacious, kind and one of the most beautiful women at court.

== At the court of Henry ==
Elisabeth Brooke, daughter of George Brooke, 9th Baron Cobham, was around fourteen years old when she arrived at court as a maid-of-honour to Queen Katherine Howard. Her aunt and namesake, Elizabeth Brooke, was notorious as her husband, Sir Thomas Wyatt, had left her after he discovered her adultery. The day after Katherine Howard was condemned to death for adultery, the Imperial ambassador wrote that Henry was paying particular attention to the elder Elizabeth Brooke, and that 'she had wit enough to do as badly as the others if she wished.' She was thought to be a possible candidate for wife number six.

Her lover, William Parr, had been a close friend of Henry VIII's illegitimate son, Henry Fitzroy, Duke of Richmond. William then began an affair with Elisabeth's maternal aunt, Dorothy Bray Baroness Chandos. His wife, Anne, then left court and had an illegitimate child by another man in 1541. Elisabeth became involved with Parr around the time that the King chose William's sister, Katherine, to be his sixth wife, and the relationship quickly became common knowledge. As the brother-in-law of the King, he was in favour at court. Despite the annulment of four of King Henry's marriages, divorce was still not possible for the average person. A man could divorce a wife if she was found to be adulteress, as William Parr's first wife Anne Bourchier was found, and he did legally cast her aside through an act of parliament in 1543; the act declared Anne's children to be bastards. However, the law prevented him from remarrying.

== Reign of Edward ==
After Henry's death, William applied to the new king, Edward VI, for a divorce and permission to remarry, but Edward Seymour, 1st Duke of Somerset, the Lord Protector, turned down the request. Elisabeth was sent to live in Chelsea with Katherine Parr, whose household also included Princess Elizabeth and Lady Jane Grey.

In the meantime, Katherine Parr had married the Protector's brother, Sir Thomas Seymour, and she died in September 1548, reducing Northampton's influence.

Francis Van der Delft, the Imperial ambassador, wrote to the Emperor in February 1548 that Parr 'was obliged by the command of the council to put her away and never speak to her again on pain of death...he is only spoken of secretly and does not show himself at court'. In 1549, a political coup ousted Somerset and replaced him with Northampton's close friend, John Dudley, 1st Duke of Northumberland, and on 31 March 1551, a private bill was passed in Parliament annulling Parr's marriage to Anne Bourchier and accepting Elisabeth Brooke as his legal wife. The couple set up home together at Winchester House, Southwark.

In June 1550, the French Duc de Vendôme was spending time at the English court and although she was now married to Northampton, Vendôme took an interest in her and gave her a present when he returned to France, a chain worth 200 crowns.

Their expenditure records show the Northamptons' love of socialising and sports; their gambling at cards, bear baiting and more cultured events such as plays and musical performances.

== Reign of Mary and Elizabeth ==
The accession of Mary I in 1553 led to Northampton being ordered to return to his first wife. Both Elisabeth and her father, Lord Cobham, had supported Lady Jane Grey's claim to the throne. There is some suggestion that she continued to plot against Mary and in favour of Elizabeth. When Mary I died and Elizabeth became queen of England, Northampton's titles were restored, and his divorce and remarriage were accepted. The Marchioness became so close to Elizabeth I that her influence was said to rival Robert Dudley's. Elisabeth's importance is shown by the number of surviving letters discussing her illness at this time. She was courted by the Swedish and Spanish ambassadors in the hope that she would support them.

By 1564, Elisabeth was suffering from breast cancer, and desperate to be cured. With her brother and sister-in-law, she traveled to the Netherlands, looking for a treatment to alleviate her condition. She had doctors from all over Europe looking for a cure and exploiting her false hope in a cure. Queen Elizabeth arranged for the personal physician of the King of Bohemia to attend Elisabeth in England. One doctor's servant, Griffith, who was meant to be helping the dying woman, attempted to seduce her, earning him and the doctor a place each in prison in January 1565.

Elisabeth died, aged around 39, on 2 April 1565, heavily in debt. The Queen was devastated. Five years later, Northampton married a young Swedish noblewoman, Helena Snakenborg who had travelled with Princess Cecilia of Sweden on a diplomatic mission. She apparently looked very like his beloved Elisabeth. In January 1571, Anne Bourchier died, leaving his union with Helena beyond doubt. Parr died soon after.
