= Anne Bourchier, 7th Baroness Bourchier =

English noblewoman

Anne Bourchier
- suo jure Baroness Bourchier suo jure Lady Lovayne; Baroness Parr of Kendal
- Born: 1517; England
- Died: 28 January 1571 (aged about 54)
- Noble family: Bourchier (by birth); Parr (by marriage)
- Spouse: William Parr, 1st Marquess of Northampton
- Issue: (illegitimate by John Lyngfield): Mary, wife of Thomas York
- Father: Henry Bourchier, 2nd Earl of Essex, 6th Baron Bourchier, Viscount Bourchier, 2nd Count of Eu
- Mother: Mary Say

Anne Bourchier (1517 – 28 January 1571) was the suo jure 7th Baroness Bourchier, suo jure Lady Lovayne, and Baroness Parr of Kendal. She was the first wife of William Parr, 1st Marquess of Northampton, Earl of Essex, and the sister-in-law of Katherine Parr, the sixth wife of Henry VIII of England.

She created a scandal in 1541 when she deserted her husband to elope with her lover, John Lyngfield (John Hunt or Huntley), the prior of St. James's Church, Tanbridge, Surrey, by whom she would have several illegitimate children. In 1543, Lord Parr obtained an act of Parliament, Lady Parr's Children Illegitimacy Act 1542 (34 & 35 Hen. 8. c. 43 Pr.), repudiating Anne and nullifying their marriage.

== Family ==
Lady Anne Bourchier was born in 1517, the only child of Henry Bourchier, 2nd Earl of Essex, 6th Baron Bourchier, Viscount Bourchier, 3rd Count of Eu, and Mary Say, who was a lady-in-waiting to Henry VIII's first Queen Consort, Katherine of Aragon. Her paternal grandparents were Sir William Bourchier, Viscount Bourchier and Lady Anne Woodville, a younger sister of the English Queen Consort Elizabeth Woodville. Anne was related to three Queen Consorts of Henry VIII; Anne Boleyn, Jane Seymour, and Katherine Howard who all shared the same great-grandmother Elizabeth Cheney.

As the only child of the last Bourchier Earl of Essex, as well as the contingent heiress of the Countess of Oxford, Anne was one of the wealthiest heiresses in England.

The Bourchier wealth derived from the 14th century marriage of Sir William Bourchier to Eleanor de Lovayne (27 March 1345 – 5 October 1397), a rich heiress in her own right.

Anne had one known son, named John Parr, who was born around 1534.

== Marriage and inheritance ==
On 9 February 1527, Anne was married to Sir William Parr, the only son of Sir Thomas Parr, Sheriff of Northamptonshire and Maud Green. Anne was approximately ten years old at the time of her marriage which had been diligently arranged by her ambitious mother-in-law. Anne later succeeded to the titles of suo jure 7th Baroness Bourchier and Lady Lovayne on 13 March 1540 at the time of her father's accidental death. His viscounty of Bourchier and earldom of Essex did not pass to her, however, and both titles became extinct upon his death. Her husband had been created 1st Baron Parr of Kendal in 1539.

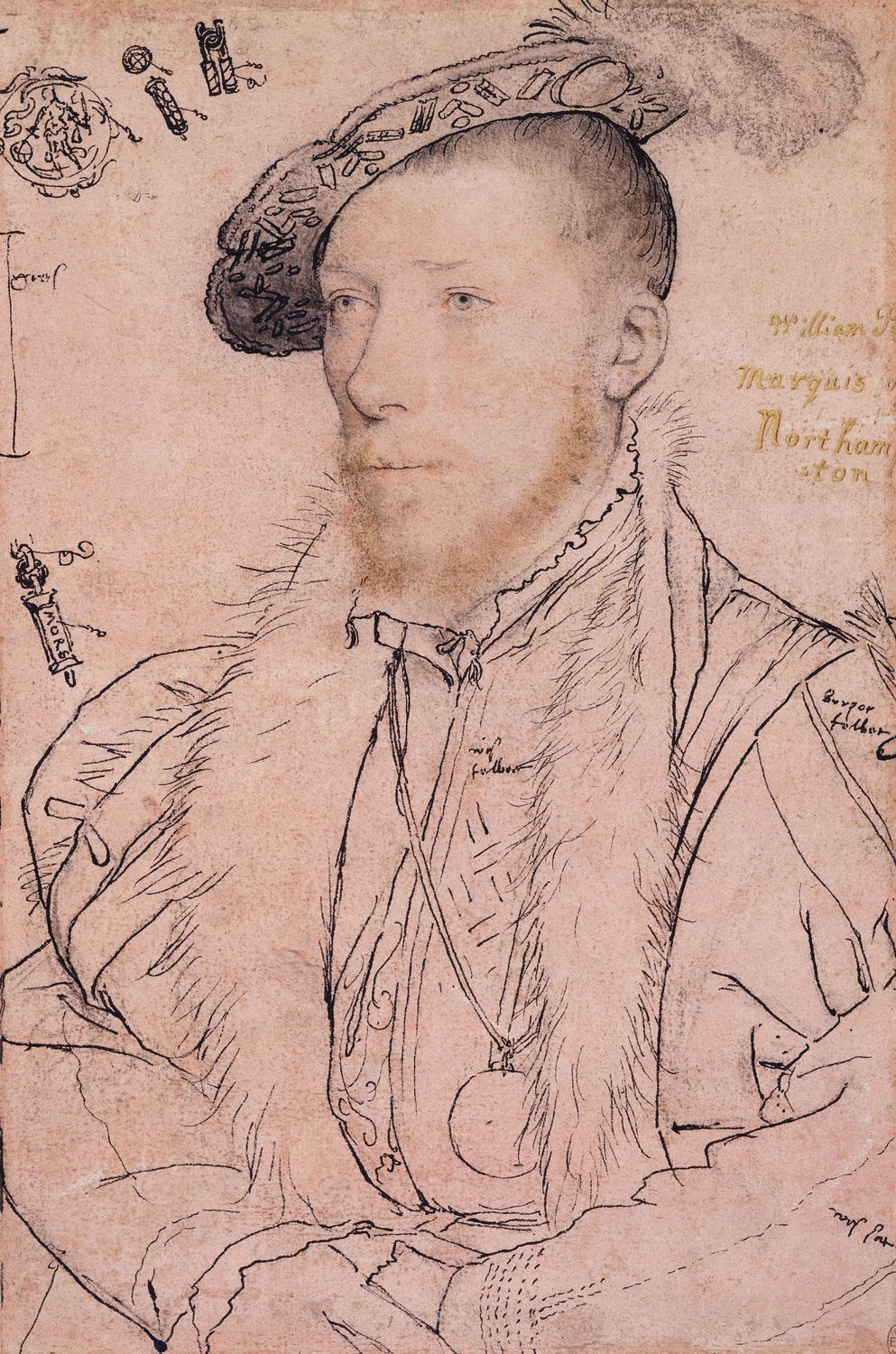
William Parr, 1st Marquess of Northampton, husband of Lady Anne Bourchier

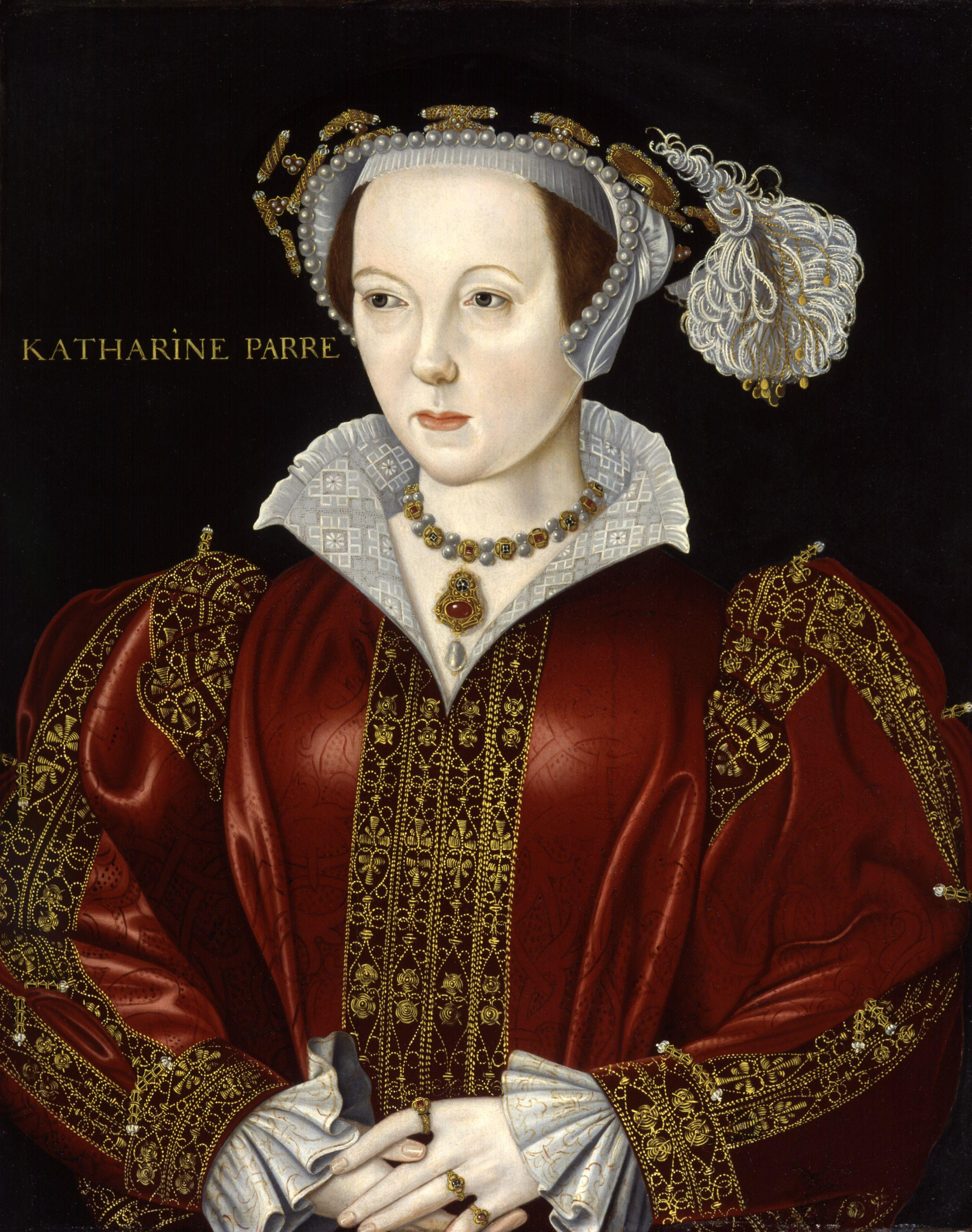
Queen Katherine Parr, the sister-in-law of Lady Anne Bourchier

== Adultery ==
Anne and Parr were unhappy from the very start of their marriage. After their marriage in 1527, the couple did not live with each other until twelve years later. Anne was described as having been poorly-educated; and she appeared to prefer the peace of the countryside to the excitement of Henry VIII's court, as her first recorded appearance at court, where she attended a banquet, wasn't until 22 November 1539, when she was aged 22.

In 1541, a scandal erupted when Anne eloped with her lover, John Lyngfield (also known as John Hunt or Huntley), the prior of St James's Church, in Tanbridge, Surrey, by whom she had an illegitimate child. The birth of this child prompted Baron Parr to take action against her to protect his own interests, lest the baby should in the future lay claim to his estates. In January 1543, he applied to Parliament, asking for a separation from Anne on the grounds of her adultery. From the Letters and Papers, Foreign and Domestic, of Henry VIII, dated 22 January 1543, there is the following item:

"Whereas lady Anne, wife of Sir Wm Parre lord Parre continued in adultery notwithstanding admonition, and, finally, two years past, left his company and has since had a child begotten in adultery and that the said child and all future children she may have shall be held bastards."

Parr's sister, Katherine Parr, in March 1543 used her influence to help her brother and on 17 April 1543, he obtained an Aact of Parliament, Lady Parr's Children Illegitimacy Act 1542 (34 & 35 Hen. 8. c. 43 Pr.), repudiating Anne and her child, who was declared a bastard, and unfit to inherit. The act was styled in the Lords' journal as a bill "to bar and make base and bastards, the child which be, or shall be borne in adultery by the Lady Anne, wife of the Lord Parr". This act was read for the first time on 13 March 1543. The act stated in the 34th Year Hen. VIII:

"That for the last two years she [Anne] had eloped from her husband, William Lord Parr, and had not in that time ever returned to nor had any carnal intercourse with him, but had been gotten with child by one of her adulterors and been delivered of such child, which child 'being as is notoriously known, begotten in adultery, and born during the espousals' between her and Lord Parr 'by the law of this realm is inheritable and may pretend to inherit all &c;' and the Act therefore declared the said child to be a bastard."

At this time, his sister Katherine was being courted by King Henry VIII. Anne spent the next few years living in exile at the manor of Little Wakering, in Essex. She was allegedly reduced to a state of poverty.

That same year (1543), William Parr had begun his courtship of Elizabeth Brooke, who was the niece of his mistress, Dorothy Bray (or Braye), as well as a former maid of honour of Anne of Cleves and Katherine Howard. He was created 1st Earl of Essex on 23 December 1543. On 31 March 1552, a bill was passed in Parliament which declared the marriage between Parr and Bourchier to be null and void.

== Later years ==
Upon the accession of Queen Mary I, William Parr was arrested and was committed to the Tower after his traitorous complicity with John Dudley, 1st Duke of Northumberland's failed plot against Mary to place Lady Jane Grey upon the throne. After William Parr was sentenced to death on 18 August 1553, Anne went to court and intervened on his behalf with Queen Mary I in hopes that they [she] would be able to keep their estates. Parr was released. The bill which had declared their marriage null and void was reversed on 24 March 1554. That December, Anne used the reversal to her advantage and was granted an annuity of £100. Again in December 1556, Anne was granted another annuity of £450. She remained at the royal court until the ascension of Elizabeth I. Elizabeth held William Parr in high favour and Anne most likely knew that her adulterous history would not endear her to the Queen. William Parr was restored to blood and was re-created Marquess of Northampton, re-elected to the Order of the Garter, and was made a privy councillor among other things.

She had several more children by John Lyngfield but they, like her first child, were legally declared bastards. Only one daughter, Mary, is documented as having lived to adulthood. She married a Thomas York by whom she had children, but they all lived in obscurity. Author Charlotte Merton suggested that Katherine Nott, who held an unspecified position in Queen Elizabeth I's household from 1577 to 1578, was also a daughter of Anne.

Sir Robert Rochester and Sir Edward Waldegrave held Benington Park, in Hertfordshire, as feoffees for her use; however, upon the death of Rochester in 1557, Waldegrave transferred the property to Sir John Butler. In response, Anne brought a lawsuit against Waldegrave and Butler which was heard in the Court of Chancery. She won the case but Butler petitioned to retry the case and continued to regard the park as his own. Butler's petition was apparently unsuccessful because following Queen Elizabeth I's accession to the throne in November 1558, Anne had retired to Benington Park where she quietly spent the rest of her life.

=== Death ===
Anne Bourchier died on 28 January 1571 at Benington. Parr died the same year and was buried in the Collegiate Church of St. Mary in Warwick. His funeral and burial was paid by the Queen. He had married two times after Anne, but only his third wife, Helena Snakenborg, whom he had married after Anne's death in May was considered legal. He fathered no children by any of his wives and the little money and estates he had left were passed to his cousins.

Upon Anne's death, the barony of Bourchier passed to her cousin, Walter Devereux, 1st Earl of Essex.

== Sources ==
1. Martienssen, Anthony (1973). Queen Katherine Parr. New York: McGraw-Hill Book Company. ISBN 0-07-040610-3

Peerage of England
Preceded by Henry Bourchier	Baroness Bourchier; 1540–1571	Succeeded by Walter Devereux
