= Frances Newton, Baroness Cobham =

Lady of the Bed Chamber

Frances Newton
- Born: 1539
- Died: 17 October 1592 (aged 52–53)
- Spouse: William Brooke, 10th Baron Cobham
- Issue: Maximilian Brooke; Henry Brooke, 11th Baron Cobham; SirWilliam Brooke; George Brooke; Elizabeth Brooke; Frances Brooke; Margaret Brooke
- Father: Sir John Newton
- Mother: Margaret Poyntz

Frances Newton, Baroness Cobham (1539 – 17 October 1592) was an English courtier who served Queen Elizabeth I of England as a Lady of the Bedchamber, and was one of her closest female friends. She was the second wife of William Brooke, 10th Baron Cobham.

== Family background ==
Frances was born in 1539, one of the 19 children of Sir John Newton, Knight, of Barrs Court, Gloucestershire and East Harptree, Somerset, who lived in Gloucestershire and died before November 1568 with will probated on 17 November. Her mother was Margaret Poyntz, a daughter of Sir Anthony Poyntz and Elizabeth Huddersfield. Sir John Newton's surname was originally Cradock and he was of Welsh origin.

== Career ==
Frances entered the service of Elizabeth Tudor before 1558 as a chamberer, and following the latter's accession to the English throne as Queen Elizabeth I, she continued in her service, becoming one of her Ladies of the Bedchamber. Later in Elizabeth's reign, Frances's sisters, Katherine and Nazareth also entered the Queen's service as chamberers.

When Frances was at court, she made mufflers, biliments, and "foreheadclothes" for Queen Elizabeth from black velvet and satin. A muffler was a scarf and a biliment was part of a French hood. In the summer of 1574 she was visited by a physician, James Good, and told him that she intended to send a medicine called mithridate as a gift to Mary, Queen of Scots.

== Marriage and children ==
On 25 February 1560 at Westminster Palace, Westminster, London, Frances married William Brooke, 10th Baron Cobham, whose first wife, Dorothy Neville (d.1559), the daughter of George Nevill, 5th Baron Bergavenny by his third wife, Mary Stafford, had died, leaving him a daughter, Frances Brooke, who married firstly Thomas Coppinger (1546-1580), and secondly Edward Becher.

Upon her marriage, Frances Newton was styled Baroness Cobham as her husband had succeeded to the title of Baron Cobham two years previously.

They made their home at the Brooke family seat, Cobham Hall in Kent, where Queen Elizabeth paid them a visit on 17 July 1560 during her summer progress, and many years later on 4 September 1573. Frances was one of the Queen's closest female friends, and Frances preferred to remain at court; however, she returned to Cobham Hall to give birth to her children.

Together William Brooke and Frances had seven children:

- Maximilian Brooke (4 December 1560 – July 1583), eldest son and heir, who died without issue.
- Elizabeth Brooke (12 January 1562 - 24 January 1597), who married on 31 August 1589 Robert Cecil, 1st Earl of Salisbury, by whom she had issue.
- Frances Brooke (born 12 January 1562), who married firstly, circa 1580, John Stourton, 9th Baron Stourton, (1553–1588), and secondly Sir Edward More (d.1623) of Odiham, Hampshire.
- Margaret Brooke (2 June 1563 – 1621), who in 1584 married, as his second wife, Sir Thomas Sondes (1544–1593) of Throwley, Kent, by whom she had a daughter, Frances Sondes (1592–c.1634), who married Sir John Leveson (d.1613).
- Henry Brooke, 11th Baron Cobham (22 November 1564 – 24 January 1619), married Lady Frances Howard (1566 – July 1628), by whom he had no issue. He was implicated in the Main Plot against King James I.
- Sir William Brooke (11 December 1565 – 1597)
- Sir George Brooke (17 April 1568 – 5 December 1603), who married Elizabeth Burgh (died c. 1637), the eldest daughter and coheir of Thomas Burgh, 3rd Baron Burgh (d. 14 October 1597), by whom he had a son, William (1601–1643), and two daughters, Elizabeth and Frances. He was executed for high treason against King James I. After his death his widow married Francis Reade.

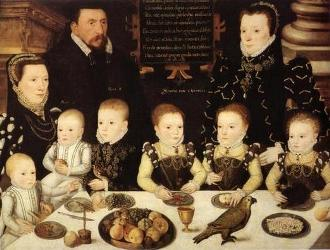
Cobham family memorial portrait

== Death ==
Lady Cobham died on 17 October 1592 at Cobham Hall, Cobham, Kent, and was buried in the Cobham Parish Church.

== In art ==
In 1567, Lady Cobham was painted with her husband, children and sister Johanna in a Cobham family memorial portrait by the Master of the Countess of Warwick.
