= William Brooke, 10th Baron Cobham =

English peer and MP for Hythe and Rochester

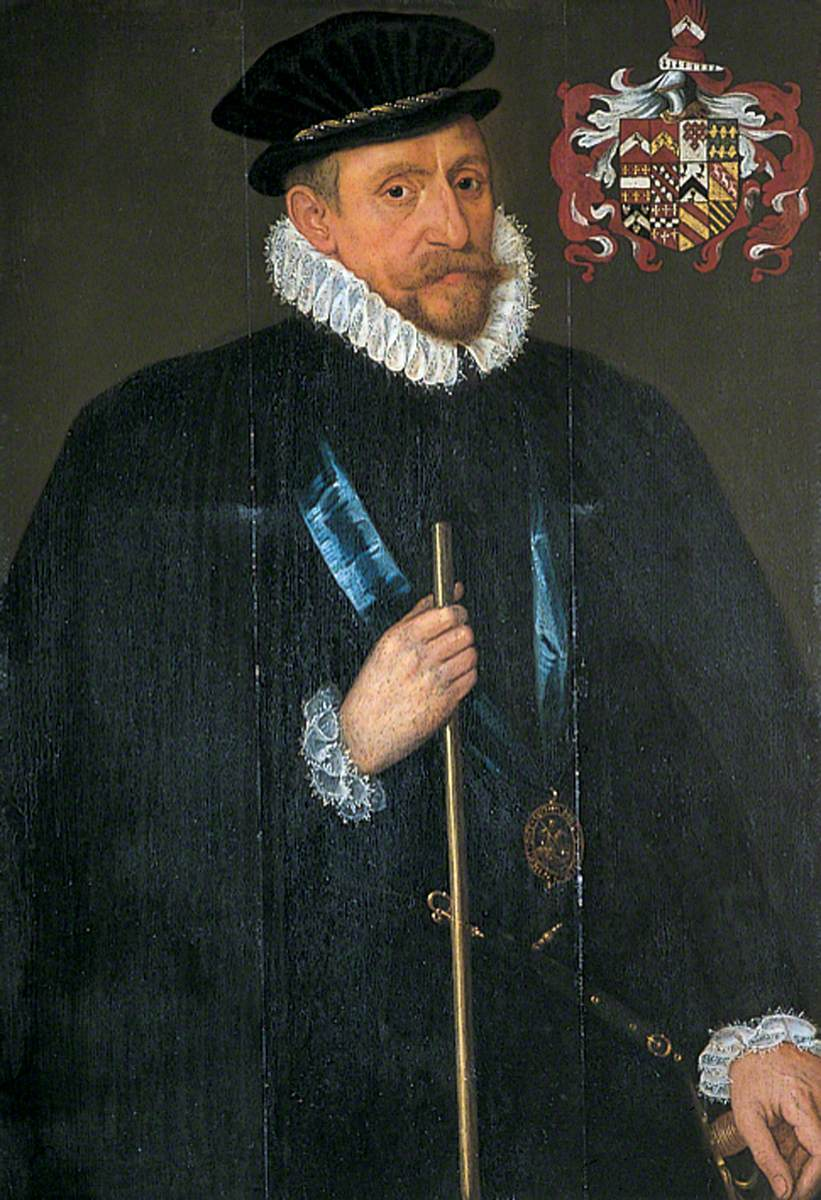
- William Brooke, 10th Baron Cobham, wearing the Collar of the Order of the Garter and holding staff of office as Lord Warden of the Cinque Ports with arms quarterly of 12 above
- Born: 1 November 1527
- Died: 6 March 1597 (aged 69)
- Noble family: Brooke
- Spouses: Dorothy Nevill; Frances Newton
- Issue: Sir Maximilian Brooke; Henry Brooke, 11th Baron Cobham; Sir William Brooke; Sir George Brooke; Elizabeth Brooke, Countess of Salisbury; Frances Brooke, Baroness Stourton; Margaret Brooke, Lady Sondes
- Father: George Brooke, 9th Baron Cobham
- Mother: Anne Braye

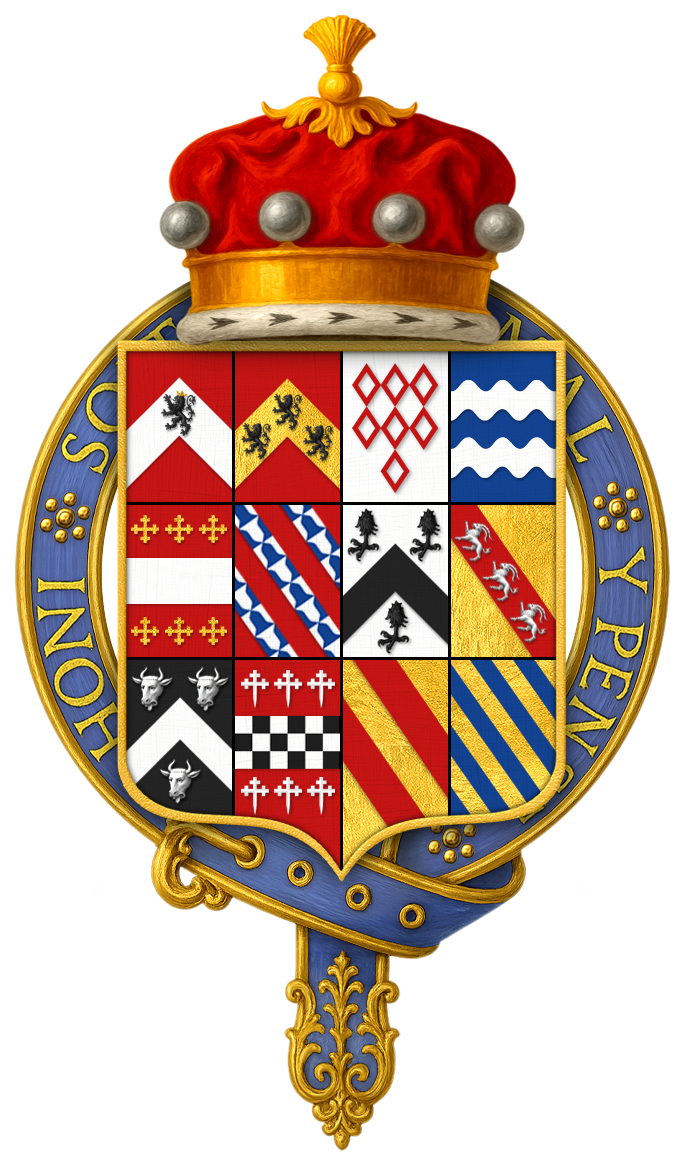
Quartered arms of Sir William Brooke, 10th Baron Cobham, KG

Sir William Brooke, 10th Baron Cobham, KG (1 November 1527 – 6 March 1597), lord of the Manor of Cobham, Kent, was Lord Warden of the Cinque Ports, and a member of parliament for Hythe. Although he was viewed by some as a religious radical during the Somerset Protectorate, he entertained Queen Elizabeth I of England at Cobham Hall in 1559, signalling his acceptance of the moderate regime.

== Biography ==
William Brooke was the son of George Brooke, 9th Baron Cobham (d. 29 September 1558), and Anne Braye (d. 1 November 1558).

Before 1544, Brooke attended The King's School, Canterbury and Queens' College, Cambridge. He spent much of his younger life in Europe. In the early 1540s, he visited Padua. By 1545, William Brooke married Dorothy Neville, daughter of George Neville, 5th Baron Bergavenny, but the marriage was unhappy, and they later separated after 1553. At the end of the decade, he served in northern France, where his father was in charge of Calais, and in 1549, he accompanied William Paget's embassy to Brussels.

Like his father, Brooke sympathized with the anti-Marian nobles; he sided with the rebels during Wyatt's rebellion, and the intervention of his brother-in-law, Henry Nevill, 6th Baron Bergavenny, was needed to keep him from prison. In 1555, he served as MP for Rochester.

In the late 1550s, Brooke's opportunities expanded in a number of areas. His father died in 1558, when he was just over thirty, and he succeeded him as Baron Cobham. Soon after, his wife Dorothy died, and in 1560 at Whitehall, he was free to marry Frances Newton, the daughter of Sir John Newton of Barr's Court, Gloucestershire. Brook became Warden of the Cinque Ports, a position in which he wielded great power over a large number of seats in Parliament. Most important, the accession of Queen Elizabeth I, and his close friendship with William Cecil, 1st Baron Burghley, made him a powerful noble. When Queen Mary I of England had died, it was Queen Elizabeth who had deputed him to inform Queen Mary's husband, Philip II of Spain, of her death. This embassy was only the first in a long series of missions and intrigues. Along with William Cecil, he numbered among his friends some nobles, such as the Duke of Norfolk and the Earl of Arundel, whose loyalty to Queen Elizabeth was far from certain. Brooke suffered some months' house imprisonment as a result of a very tangential role in the Ridolfi plot. In 1578, he joined Francis Walsingham's failed mission to the Low Countries; on this mission, he presumably served as Cecil's agent. In the late 1580s, he helped John Whitgift search for the author of the Martin Marprelate tracts.

Brooke was made a Knight of the Garter on 14 April 1585, and appointed to the Privy Council by 12 February 1586. He was involved in a minor capacity in the events that ended with the death of Mary, Queen of Scots. During the Armada crisis, he was on a diplomatic mission to Alexander Farnese, Duke of Parma. In 1589, his eldest daughter Elizabeth married William Cecil's youngest son, Robert Cecil, who would later be made the Earl of Salisbury. By the early 1590s, Brooke had assumed a less active role in government. In 1592, Brooke's second wife Frances died. He succeeded Baron Hunsdon, as Lord Chamberlain in August 1596, and held the office until his death on 6 March 1597.

During his time, William Brooke built Cobham Hall, a Tudor style mansion that remained in his family until the mid-17th century.

== Marriages and issue ==
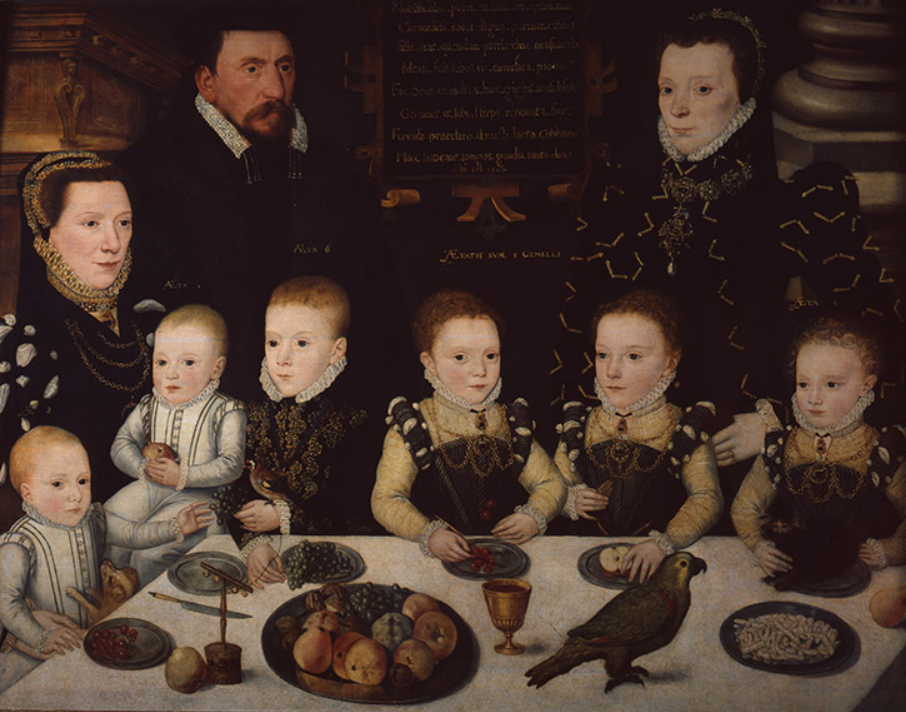
Portrait of William Brooke and his Family, 1567.

William Brooke married firstly Dorothy Nevill (d. 22 September 1559), daughter of George Nevill, 5th Baron Bergavenny, by his third wife, Lady Mary Stafford, daughter of Edward Stafford, 3rd Duke of Buckingham,. Through her father, Dorothy was the second-cousin of his father, George Brooke. By his first wife Dorothy, he had a daughter, Frances Brooke (b.1549), who married firstly Thomas Coppinger (1546–1580), and secondly Edward Becher (born c.1545).

He married secondly Frances Newton, daughter of Sir John Newton and Margaret Poyntz. By his second wife Frances, he had four sons and three daughters:

- Sir Maximilian Brooke (4 December 1560 – July 1583), eldest son and heir, who predeceased his father, and died without issue.
- Henry Brooke, 11th Baron Cobham (22 November 1564 – 24 January 1619), who married Lady Frances Howard (1566 – July 1628), daughter of Charles Howard, 1st Earl of Nottingham, widow of Henry FitzGerald, Earl of Kildare, by whom he had no issue.
- Sir William Brooke (11 December 1565 – 1597) MP. Killed in duel.
- Sir George Brooke (17 April 1568 – 5 December 1603), who married firstly Elizabeth Burgh (died c. 1637), the eldest daughter and coheir of Thomas Burgh, 3rd Baron Burgh (d. 14 October 1597), by whom he had a son, William Brooke (1601–1643), and two daughters, Elizabeth Brooke and Frances Brooke.
- Elizabeth Brooke (12 January 1562 – 24 January 1597), who married Robert Cecil, 1st Earl of Salisbury, by whom she had issue.
- Frances Brooke (born 12 January 1562), who married firstly, John Stourton, 9th Baron Stourton (1553–1588), and secondly, as his second wife, Sir Edward More (1555–1623).
- Margaret Brooke (2 June 1563 – 1621), who married, as his second wife, Sir Thomas Sondes of Throwley, Kent (1544–1593), by whom she had a daughter, Frances Sondes (1592–c.1634), who married Sir John Leveson (d.1613).

The husband of Margaret Brooke, Sir Thomas Sondes, became convinced that her daughter Frances was not his child, and levied a fine of his lands, thus effectively depriving Margaret of her jointure, and died a few months later. His brother and heir, Sir Michael Sondes, honoured Margaret's jointure, but the Sondes family never acknowledged her daughter Frances; and Margaret and Frances returned to Cobham Hall. Before he died in 1597, William Brooke made his second son Henry promise to care for his daughter Margaret, and she and her daughter remained at Cobham Hall on their own after his death. At an unknown date, Margaret went mad, and on 4 November 1602, it was reported that Doctor John Dee had been called in and 'hath delivered the Lady Sondes of a devil or of some other strange possession'. Nothing further is known of her circumstances, apart from the fact that 'the mad Lady Sondes' died in 1621, aged fifty-seven. Her daughter Frances had two daughters by Sir John Leveson, Christian and Frances. After Sir John Leveson's death, Frances married, as his first wife, Thomas Savile, who later became Earl of Sussex. There was no issue from the marriage.

== Notes ==
Political offices
Preceded by Sir Thomas Seymour	Lord Warden of the Cinque Ports; 1558–1597	Succeeded by The 11th Lord Cobham
Unknown	Lord Lieutenant of Kent; 1585–1597	Succeeded by The 11th Lord Cobham
Preceded by The Lord Hunsdon	Lord Chamberlain; 1596–1597	Succeeded by The Lord Hunsdon
Peerage of England
Preceded by George Brooke	Baron Cobham; 1558–1597	Succeeded by Henry Brooke
