= Joan Fogge =

English courtier (1492–1531)

Joan, Lady Green
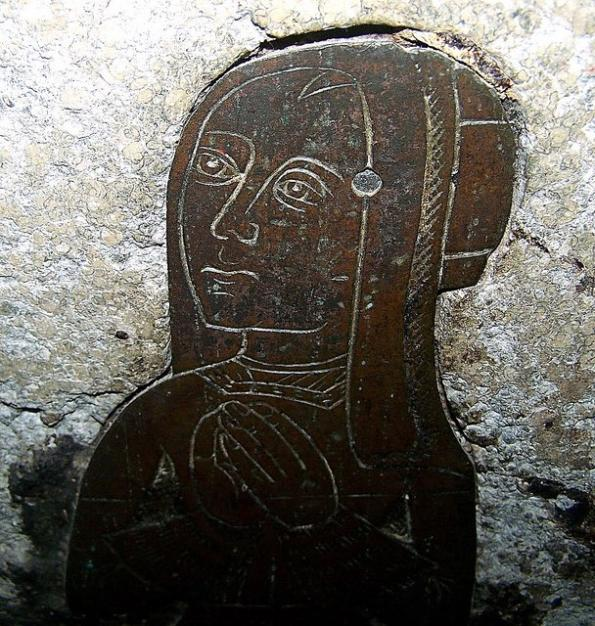
- Memorial brass of Joan Fogge at St. Bartholomew's Church, Greens Norton.
- Born: c.1469 Ashford, Kent, England
- Died: c.1490/94– 6 November 1506; Northamptonshire, England
- Buried: St. Bartholomew's Church, Greens Norton
- Noble family: Fogge (by birth); Green (by marriage)
- Spouse: Sir Thomas Green
- Issue: Maud Green; Anne Green
- Parents: Sir John Fogge; Alice Haute

Joan (or Jane) Fogge, Lady Green (c.1469 – c.1490/94 bef. 1506) was an English noblewoman. She was the mother of Maud Green, and therefore the maternal grandmother of Catherine Parr, the sixth wife of King Henry VIII.

== Birth and parentage ==
Jane was born on around 1469 in Ashford, Kent, England as the daughter of Sir John Fogge and Alice Haute.

For a long time her parentage has been uncertain.

Many sources state that she was indeed the daughter of Sir John Fogge, though other sources state that she was his granddaughter. The official biographers of Katherine Parr, Linda Porter and Dr. Susan James state that Katherine Parr is a great-granddaughter of Sir John Fogge through his daughter Joan, though in her biography on Katherine, Linda Porter states that 'Maud Green came from good Yorkist stock. Her maternal great-grandfather, Sir John Fogge, had been treasurer of the royal household between 1461 and 1468'. Sir John Fogge's will, transcribed by Pearman, states that he had three daughters, Anne, Elizabeth and Margaret, and makes no mention of Jane. It could be possible that John disowned Joan for unknown reasons, which explains why she is absent in Fogge's will, or that Joan had already died after the birth of her younger daughter Maud when the will was made since some sources state that that Maud was born in 1490, which was around the time that will was written. In the Family Chronicle of Richard Fogge of Danes Court in Tilmanstone, it is mentioned in the Fogge family pedigree that Sir John Fogge had four daughters, although only three were mentioned by name so it is likely that the unspecified daughter is Joan.

According to her father's inquisition post mortem, Maud Green was born in 1493/4. The daughters mentioned in Sir John Fogge's will were all unmarried and left sums towards their dowries. The perhaps most likely explanation is that as a married woman, Joan had already received her dowry.

Although it is mostly agreed upon that Joan was the daughter of Sir John Fogge, and his second wife Alice Haute, her parentage has remained uncertain.

Alice Haute's mother, however, was called Joan Woodville.

And the Widville pedigree, taken in 1480–1500, tells us that Iohanna nupta domino Thome Greene militi. This Iohanna was the daughter of Alicia nupta domino Iohanni Fogge militi. And this Alicia was the daughter of Willelmus Hault armiger by a lady Wideuille, to be more specific, the daughter of Ricardus Wideuille armiger and a filia de Bedelsgate.

In 1471:

July 10. Westminster.

Grant to John Fogge, knight, of the custody of all lordships, manors, Westminster, lands, rents, services and possessions late of Thomas Grene of Norton, co. Northampton, knight, deceased, tenant in chief, during the minority of Thomas his son and heir, and the custody and marriage of the latter without disparagement and so from heir to heir. By p.s.

Joan married her father's ward.

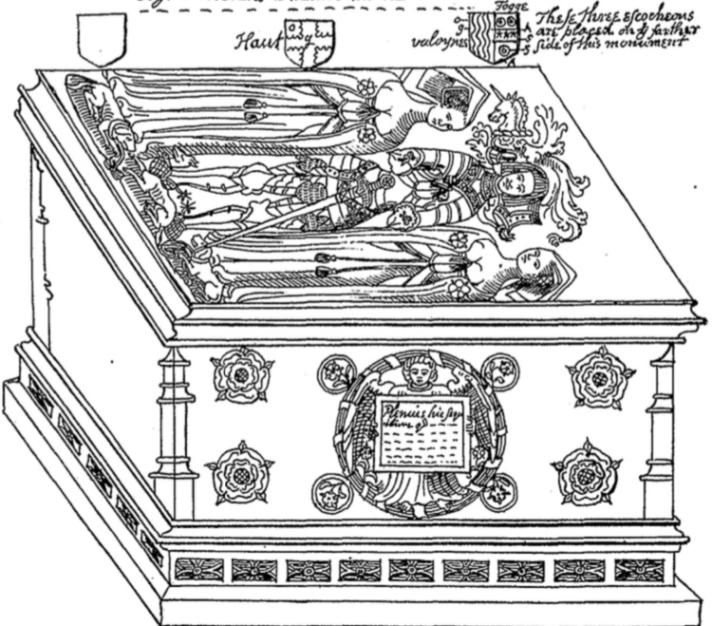
Sketch of the tomb of Jane's alleged parents, and step-mother.

== Marriage & issue ==
At an unknown date, probably in the late 1480s, Joan married Sir Thomas Green, the son of Sir Thomas Greene (d.1462) and Matilda (Maud) Throckmorton (c.1425–1496). He was a member of the English gentry who died in the Tower of London, where he had been imprisoned for treason. The couple had two daughters, they were:

- Maud Green (6 April 1493/4 – 1 December 1531), was an English courtier and lady-in-waiting to Catherine of Aragon, the first wife of King Henry VIII. She married Sir Thomas Parr, the eldest son of Sir William Parr and Elizabeth FitzHugh in 1508. They had three surviving children:

- Catherine Parr in 1512.
- William Parr, Marquess of Northampton in 1513.
- Anne Herbert, Countess of Pembroke in 1515.

- Anne Green (1489/90 – before 14 May 1523), eldest daughter. She was listed as a gentlewoman of honour to Elizabeth of York in 1503. She married Nicholas Vaux, 1st Baron Vaux of Harrowden, son of Sir William Vaux and Katherine Peniston in 1507, they had five children:

- Thomas Vaux, 2nd Baron Vaux of Harrowden (1509–1556)
- William Vaux (d. May 1523)
- Bridget Vaux (married Maurice Walsh bef.1538)
- Margaret Vaux (married Sir Francis Pulteney of Misterton about 1525)
- Maud Vaux (d. 14 Apr 1569)

When Sir Thomas Green died, he left two motherless daughters. As he had no male heirs, his estates passed to the Parr and Vaux families, into which his two daughters married.

== Death & burial ==
Joan's exact date of death remains in obscurity. She would die of unknown causes between 1490 or 94 after the birth of her younger daughter Maud, or before 9 November 1506 when her husband died as it was stated that their daughters Maud and Anne were orphaned after the demise of their father. Joan was buried at St. Bartholomew's Church, in Greens Norton where her parents in-law were buried, and her husband would join her in burial in 1506. A memorial brass of Joan still survives.

== Sources ==
- Fraser, Antonia (1993). "Katherine Parr". The Wives of Henry VIII. Vintage Publishing.
- James, Susan (2009). Katherine Parr: Henry VIII's Last Love.
- Pearman, A.J. (1868). History of Ashford. Ashford: H. Igglesden. p. 123.
- Porter, Linda (2010). Katherine, the Queen: The Remarkable Life of Katherine Parr, the Last Wife of Henry VIII.
