= Thomas Vaux, 2nd Baron Vaux of Harrowden =

English courtier and poet 1509–1556

The Lord Vaux of Harrowden
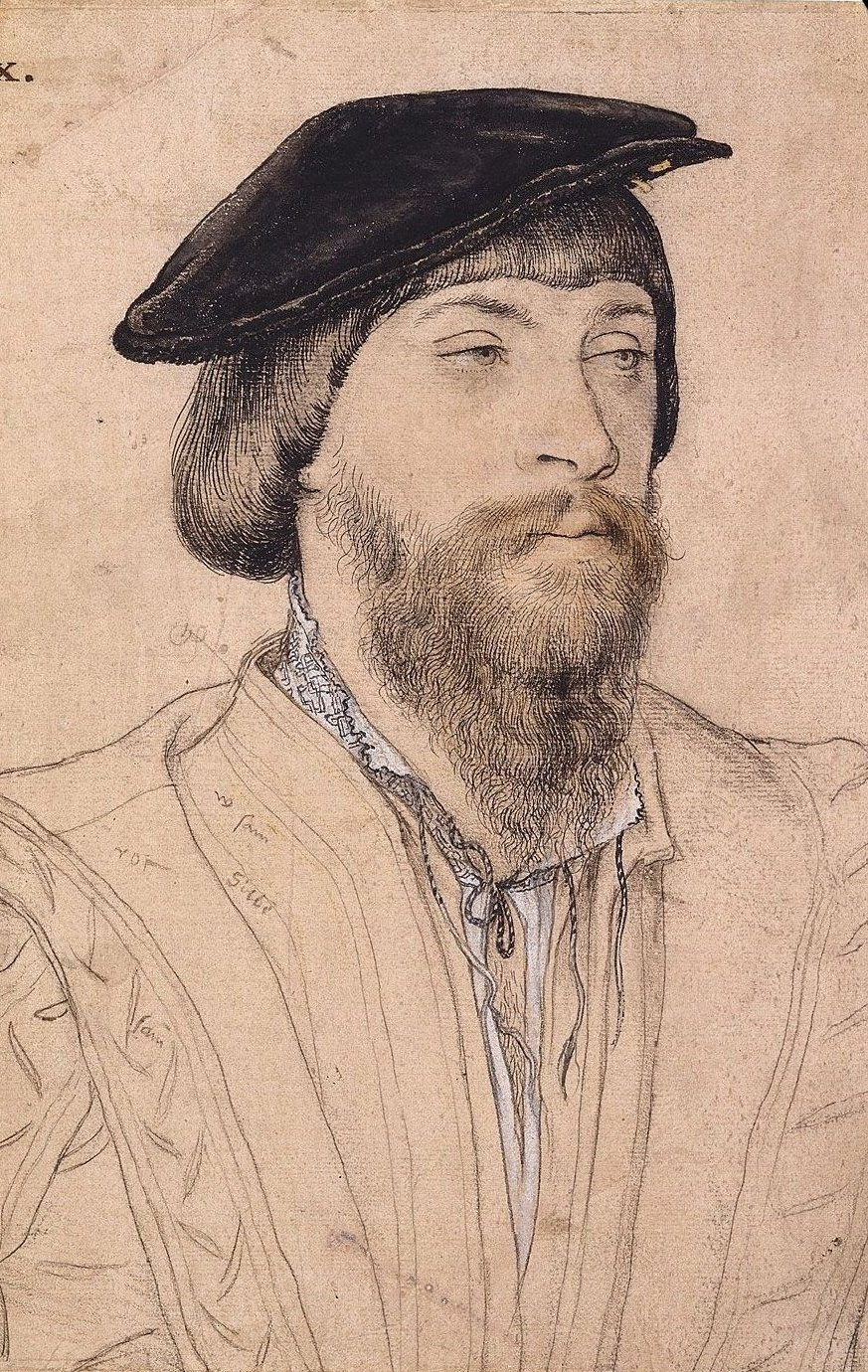
- Portrait of Thomas, Lord Vaux, circa unknown.
- Born: 25 April 1509
- Died: 15 October 1556 (aged 47)
- Education: Cambridge University
- Occupations: Poet, dramatist, essayist, novelist
- Spouse: Elizabeth Cheney (m. 1523–1556; his death)
- Writing career
- Language: Early Modern English
- Movement: Elizabethan literature

Thomas Vaux, 2nd Baron Vaux of Harrowden KB (/ˈvɔːks/ VAWKS; 25 April 1509 – October 1556), English poet, was the eldest son of Nicholas Vaux, 1st Baron Vaux and his second wife, Anne Green, daughter of Sir Thomas Green, Lord of Nortons Green, and Joan Fogge. He was educated at Cambridge University. His mother was the maternal aunt of Queen Consort Katherine Parr, while his wife, Elizabeth Cheney, was her paternal cousin through Katherine's father's sister, Anne Parr.

== Life ==
In 1527, he accompanied Cardinal Thomas Wolsey on his embassy in France. Vaux privately disapproved of King Henry VIII's divorce from his first wife, Catherine of Aragon. In 1531, he took his seat in the House of Lords. In 1532, he attended Henry to Calais and Boulogne and was made Knight of the Bath at the coronation of Anne Boleyn. He was Lieutenant Governor of Jersey in 1536. Schism from Rome caused him to sell his offices; he did not attend Parliament between 1534 and 1554. Instead, Vaux retired to his country seat until the accession of Mary I, when he returned to London for her coronation. Vaux was the friend of other court poets such as Sir Thomas Wyatt and Henry Howard, Earl of Surrey.

== Family and issue ==
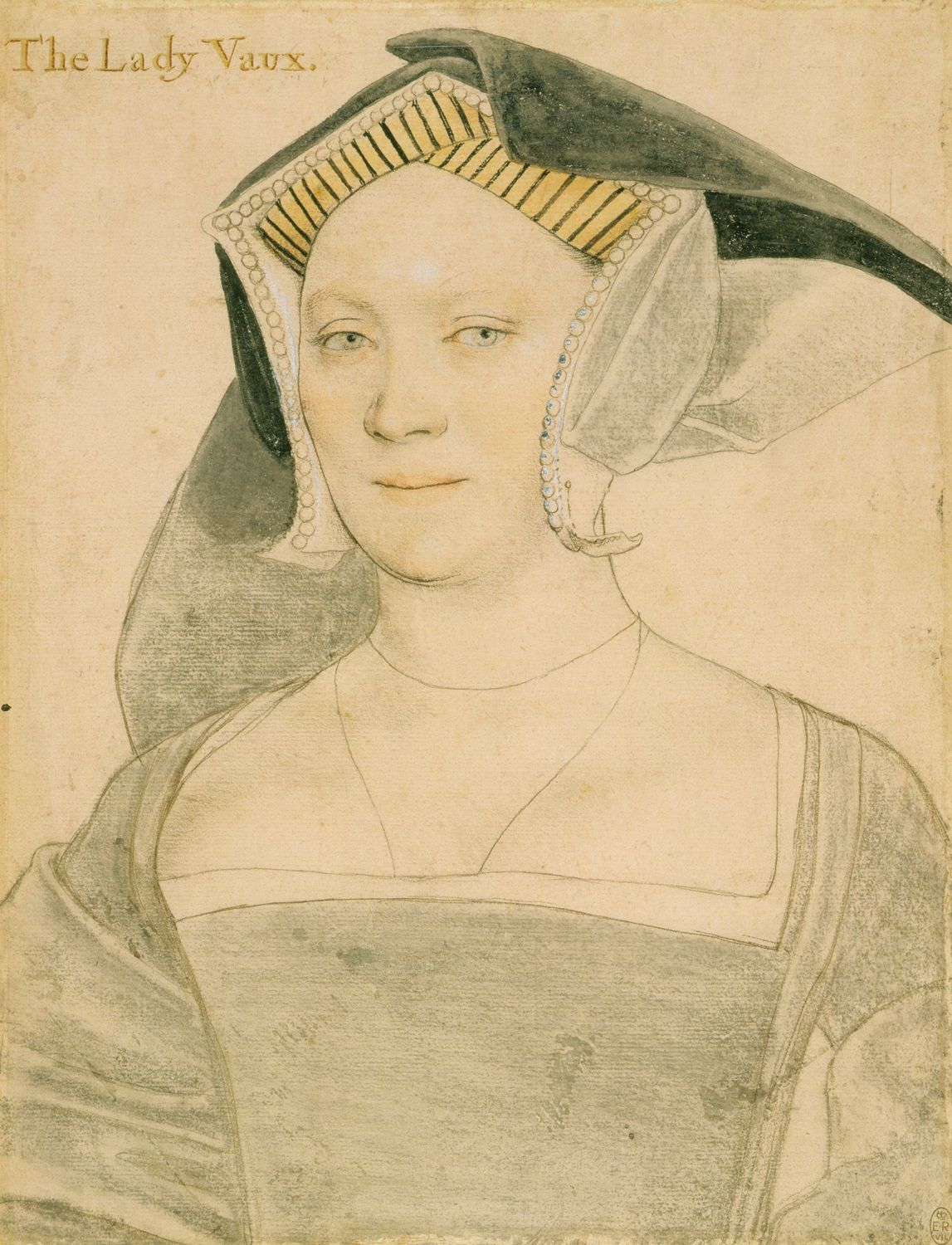
Elizabeth Cheney, Lady Vaux. Black and coloured chalks; Royal Collection, Windsor Castle.

Thomas's father, Nicholas, had been previously married to Elizabeth FitzHugh, daughter of Henry FitzHugh, 5th Lord FitzHugh of Ravensworth Castle and Lady Alice Neville, as her second husband. From that marriage, Vaux had three older paternal half-sisters; Katherine Throckmorton; Alice Sapcote; and Anne Le Strange. By Elizabeth's first marriage to Sir William Parr, she was the mother of Anne Parr, the mother of Thomas' wife, Elizabeth Cheney. Elizabeth FitzHugh was also the mother to Sir Thomas Parr, thus making her the paternal grandmother of Queen Catherine Parr. After the death of Elizabeth in about 1507, his father married secondly to Anne Green, who was the older sister of Maud Green who had married Sir Thomas Parr; thus making Vaux a first cousin to Queen Catherine.

On 6 May 1511, Sir Thomas, aged two, was contracted to marry Elizabeth Cheney, the daughter of Sir Thomas Cheyne of Irthlingborough (d. 1514) and Anne Parr. Thomas married Elizabeth between 25 April 1523 and 10 November 1523. They had three children.

- William Vaux, 3rd Baron Vaux of Harrowden (born 1535)
- Nicholas Vaux
- Anne Vaux, who married Reginald Bray of Stene, nephew of Edmund Braye, 1st Baron Braye

Thomas Vaux died in October 1556. Sketches of Vaux and his wife by Holbein are held at Windsor Castle and a finished portrait of Lady Vaux at Hampton Court.

Arms of Vaux: Chequy argent and gules, on a chevron azure, three roses or

== Works ==
Two of his poems were included in the Songes and Sonettes of Surrey (Tottel's Miscellany), published in 1557: "The assault of Cupid upon the fort where the lover's hart lay wounded, and how he was taken," and the "Dittye ... representinge the Image of Deathe," which the gravedigger in Shakespeare's Hamlet misquotes.

Thirteen pieces in the Paradise of Dainty Devices, published in 1576, are signed by him. These are reprinted in Alexander Grosart's Miscellanies of the Fuller Worthies Library (vol. iv, 1872).

== See also ==
- Canons of Elizabethan poetry

== Sources ==
- Lee, Sidney, ed. (1899). "Vaux, Thomas" . Dictionary of National Biography. Vol. 58. London: Smith, Elder & Co.
- Woudhuysen, H. R. "Vaux, Thomas, second Baron Vaux (1509–1556)". Oxford Dictionary of National Biography (online ed.). Oxford University Press. doi:10.1093/ref:odnb/28163. (Subscription, Wikipedia Library access or UK public library membership required.)
- This article contains text from A General and Heraldic Dictionary of the Peerages of England, Ireland, and Scotland: Extinct, Dormant, and in Abeyance, Vol. VIII, by John Burke, 1831, now in the public domain Burke, John (1831). A General and Heraldic Dictionary of the Peerages of England, Ireland, and Scotland: Extinct, Dormant, and in Abeyance. H. Colburn & R. Bentley.

Political offices
Preceded by Sir Arthur Darcy	Lieutenant Governor of Jersey; 1536	Succeeded by Sir Edward Seymour
Peerage of England
Preceded by Nicholas Vaux	Baron Vaux of Harrowden; 1523–1556	Succeeded by William Vaux
