= John Fogge =

Member of the Parliament of England

Sir John Fogge
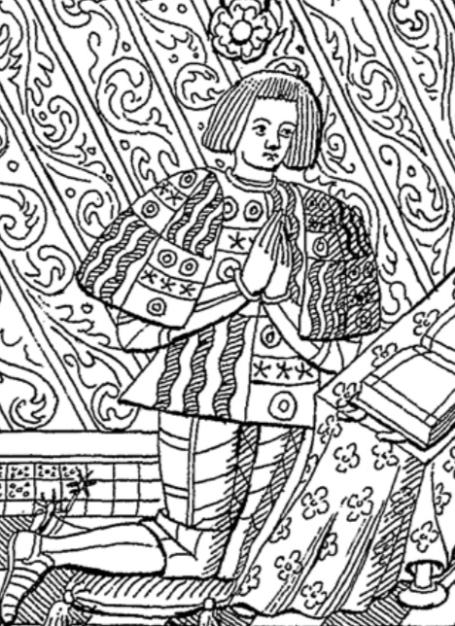
- Sketch of a memorial window of Sir John Fogge.
- Born: c.1417
- Died: c.9 November 1490
- Spouses: Alice Kyriell; Alice Haute
- Issue: John Fogge; Thomas Fogge; Anne Fogge; Elizabeth Fogge; Margaret Fogge; Joan Fogge
- Father: John Fogge

Sir John Fogge (c. 1417–1490) was an English courtier, soldier and supporter of the Woodville family under Edward IV who became an opponent of Richard III.

== Family ==
There is some uncertainty over the parents of Fogge. The most well-known source, The Family Chronicle of Richard Fogge of Danes Court in Tilmanstone shows John as the son of Sir William Fogge and an un-named daughter of William Wadham, Sir William Fogge's second wife. The Antiquary states that he was the son of Sir William and his first wife, a daughter of Sir William Septvans (d. 1448). However, Rosemary Horrox argues that he was the son of another John Fogge, Sir William's younger brother, and Jane Cotton.

John Fogge was born about 1417 and it seems certain that he was the grandson of Sir Thomas Fogge—as he was eventually the recipient of his inheritance—(d. 13 July 1407) and Joan de Valence (d. 8 July 1420), widow of William Costede of Costede, Kent, and daughter of Sir Stephen de Valence of Repton.

In a lawsuit in 1460 he calls himself son and heir of John.

In The Family Chronicle of Richard Fogge of Danes Court in Tilmanstone published in 1868, it is strongly suggested that the William Fogge who married the daughters of Wadham and Septvans was the William Fogge (1396 – by February 1447) who was the grandson and heir of Sir Thomas Fogge (d. 13 July 1407) by his son Thomas Fogge (d. 1405). The Family Chronicle of Richard Fogge of Danes Court in Tilmanstone also mentions another son of Sir Thomas Fogge (d. 13 July 1407), John Fogge, who Sir Thomas appointed an executor of his will.

In the History of Parliament entry for Sir John Fogge, Josiah C. Wedgwood establishes in 1936 that 'in his suit for Tonford etc., Aug. 1460, he calls himself s. and h. of John, deceased, who was a younger son of Sir Thomas Fogge M.P. Sir John's mother was Jane Catton.'

The manor of Crixall appears to have passed from the Wadham to Sir John Fogge, however.

== Tonsure ==
Gillian Draper writes:

John Fogge, the grandson of Sir Thomas, was probably born in 1417, and was ordained to the first tonsure in Canterbury Cathedral in 1425. This was a first step into the six or seven holy orders, but many boys took it and it did not mean they were firmly destined for the priesthood. Rather it represented a stage in their early education; for some boys it occurred about age seven to eight years. John Fogge was one of several boys or young men ordained to the first tonsure in 1425 including William Fogge, presumably John Fogge's cousin, and one John Cobbes.

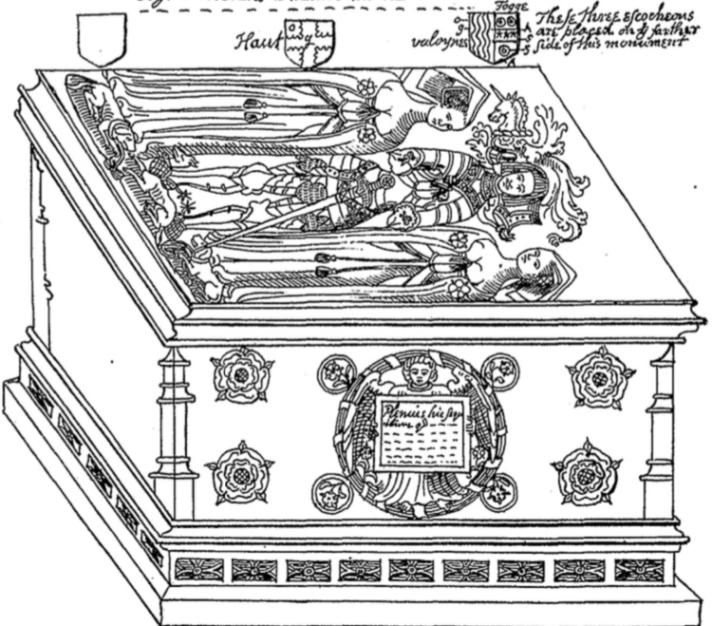
Sketch of the tomb of John Fogge, Knight, and his two wives.

== Career ==
According to Horrox, Fogge had reached the age of majority by 1438, but only came to prominence when he inherited the lands of the senior line on the death of Sir Thomas's grandson and heir, William by February 1447.

Fogge was an esquire to Henry VI by 1450, and in that year was involved in the suppression of the rebellion of Jack Cade. He was appointed Sheriff of Kent in November 1453. He was made Comptroller of the Household in 1460 under Henry VI, and knighted the following year on 27 June 1461.

Despite his earlier service under Henry VI, when the future Edward IV landed in England in June 1460, Fogge joined the Yorkists, and was granted Tonford in Thanington and Dane Court in Boughton under Blean, manors to which he claimed to be entitled by reversion.

After the Yorkist victory at the Battle of Towton on 29 March 1461, 'Fogge emerged as a leading royal associate in Kent, heading all commissions named in the county'. In 1461, he was granted the office of Keeper of the Writs of the Court of Common Pleas, and took part in the investigation of the possible treason of Sir Thomas Cooke, Lord Mayor of London. He was Treasurer of the Household to Edward IV from 1461 to 1468, as well as a member of the King's council, and in March 1462 he and others were granted custody of the lands of John de Vere, 12th Earl of Oxford, forfeited to the crown as a result of the Earl's attainder. In 1469, it was alleged that Fogge was among those whose 'covetous rule and gydynge' had brought Edward IV and the kingdom to 'great poverty and misery'.

In 1461 and 1463 he was elected to Parliament as Knight of the Shire for Kent, and in 1467 as MP for Canterbury. He was Sheriff of Kent in 1453–4 1472–3 and 1479–80.

According to Horrox, his name is not found in commissions during the Readeption of Henry VI, suggesting the possibility that he went into exile with Edward IV.

When Edward IV regained the throne, Fogge was rewarded for his loyalty with grants of land, as well as a grant for twelve years of gold and silver mines in Devon and Cornwall. During this period Fogge built close ties to the Prince of Wales, and from 1473 was a member of his council and administrator of his property. He was made Chamberlain jointly with Sir John Scott and Thomas Vaughan. He again represented Kent in parliament in 1478 and 1483.

In 1483, the future Richard III of England appointed himself Protector of Edward IV's young son and heir, Edward V, accusing the Woodvilles of plotting against him. Sir Thomas More says that Fogge took sanctuary at this time, and that Richard III was prepared to treat him with favour. Despite this apparent reconciliation, Fogge supported Richard Guildford in Kent against Richard III, a rising in support of Edward V, and became part of the unsuccessful Buckingham's rebellion.

The rising was blocked at Gravesend by John Howard, 1st Duke of Norfolk, and the rebel force retreated. Fogge was attainted, and much of his property was granted to Sir Ralph Ashton, who had been loyal to the King, and who was already in conflict with Fogge over a portion of the Kyriell inheritance from Fogge's first marriage. In February 1485 Fogge bound himself to good behaviour and was pardoned, and four of his manors were returned to him.

Fogge was a supporter of Henry Tudor. After the latter's accession, however, perhaps due to advancing age, Fogge played little part in national affairs.

Fogge left a will dated 15 July 1490, and had died by 9 November of that year.

He built and endowed the church at Ashford, Kent as well as the College at Ashford. He was buried beneath a handsome altar-tomb in the church, where he is also commemorated in a memorial window.

The Fogge arms were Argent on a fess between three annulets sable three mullets pierced of the first. The crest was a unicorn's head, argent. At the Siege of Rouen in 1418, a Thomas Fogge who was likely his great-grand-uncle, carried the same arms differenced by having unpierced mullets.

Sir John Fogge Avenue, built on the former School of Service Intelligence site in Ashford, is named after him.

== Literary references ==
A character named 'Jon Fogge', who appears to be based on this knight, appears in Marjorie Bowen's 1929 novel Dickon about the life of Richard III. In the novel he serves as a sort of sinister shadow, portending the violent fate of the king.

== Marriages and issue ==
Fogge married firstly, by the early 1440s, Alice de Criol or Kyriell, daughter of the Yorkist soldier Sir Thomas de Criol of Westenhanger, beheaded after the Second Battle of St. Albans by order of Margaret of Anjou. The marriage brought him Westenhanger Castle. Alice de Criol or Kyriell died between February 1462 when she was amongst those endowing two chaplains to pray for her father and others slain at Northampton, St. Albans and Shirebum, and 9 May 1462. They had a son and heir,

- John Fogge (d.1501), who married Joanne Leigh, daughter of Sir Richard Leigh, Lord Mayor of London (1460, 1469). Their son,
  - Sir John Fogge (d.1533), Marshal of Calais and Sheriff of Kent, married Margaret Goldwell, daughter of Jeffrey Goldwell (brother of James Goldwell, Bishop of Norwich), by whom he had three sons and three daughters:
    - Sir John Fogge (d.1564) of Repton in Ashford, Kent, eldest son, Sheriff of Kent in 1545, who married firstly Margaret Brooke, the daughter of Thomas Brooke, 8th Baron Cobham (d. 19 July 1529) by his first wife, Dorothy Heydon, and secondly Catherine, the daughter of one Holand of Calais.
    - William Fogge (d.1535) of Canterbury, buried in Canterbury Cathedral, and as by his will he expresses it, near his ancestors. He gave by it to the bell-ringers of Christ-church, for the pele, and for the making of his poole 3s. 4d. He left an infant son Francis by Katherine his wife. His only son, "Slayn at Guinse," as said in an old MS.
    - George Fogge (died c.1591) of Brabourne and Repton, who married firstly Margaret Kempe (daughter of Sir William Kempe of Olantigh by his second wife, Eleanor Browne, widow of (see below) Thomas Fogge (d. 16 August 1612), and daughter and heir of Robert Browne, son of Sir Thomas Browne of Betchworth Castle), and secondly Honor Palmer, daughter of Sir Thomas Palmer.
    - Margaret Fogge, who married Sir Humphrey Stafford. – but see below
    - Abigail Fogge, who married Cranmer Brooke (died c.1547) of Ashford, son of Thomas Brooke (third son of Thomas Brooke, 8th Baron Cobham (d. 19 July 1529)), and Susan Cranmer, niece of Archbishop Thomas Cranmer.
    - Bridget Fogge (d.1557), a maid of honour to Queen Katherine of Aragon. She married Anthony Lowe (d.1555), Esquire, of Alderwasley, 'gentleman of the bed-chamber and standardbearer to King Henry VII, King Henry VIII, King Edward VI, and Queen Mary'. It has been suggested that Bridget was the "Mother Lowe" who was Mother of the Maids under Anne of Cleves.
    - Daughter whose name is not given in the Fogge pedigree, Lettice.

John Fogge married secondly, between February 1462 (when his first wife was alive) and 9 May 1462, Alice Haute or Hawte (born c.1444), the daughter of William Haute, Esquire, MP (d.1462) of Bishopsbourne, Kent, and Joan Woodville, daughter of Richard Woodville. Richard Woodville was also the father of Richard Woodville, 1st Earl Rivers, and the grandfather of Elizabeth Woodville, and Fogge's second wife, Alice Haute was thus Elizabeth Woodville's first cousin. After her marriage to Edward IV, Elizabeth Woodville brought her favourite female relatives to court. Fogge's second wife, Alice Haute, was one of her five ladies-in-waiting during the 1460s.

By Alice Haute, Fogge had two sons and four daughters:

- William Fogge, died as a child.
- Thomas Fogge (d. 16 August 1512), esquire, of Ashford, Great Mongeham, Sutton Farm (in Sutton), Tunford (in Thanington), and Walmer, Kent, Sergeant Porter of Calais to Henry VII and Henry VIII. He married before 9 December 1509 Eleanor Browne, daughter of Robert Browne, esquire, and granddaughter of Sir Thomas Browne. They had two daughters, Alice (wife of Edward Scott and Robert Oxenbridge, Knight.) and Anne (wife of William Scott and Henry Isham). He was buried in the church at Ashford. He left a will dated 4 August 1512, proved 16 October 1512 (P.C.C. 9 Fetiplace). Eleanor married secondly Sir William Kempe of Ollantigh. As a widow, she was a gentlewoman in the household of Mary I of England, and died on 16 September 1559.
- Joan Fogge, their eldest daughter and second child, married her father's ward Sir Thomas Greene.
- Anne Fogge.
- Elizabeth Fogge.
- Margaret Fogge, who married her father's ward, Sir Humphrey Stafford (d. 22 September 1545) of Cottered and Rushden, Hertfordshire, by whom she was the mother of three sons and three daughters, including Sir Humphrey Stafford, who married Margaret Tame, daughter of Sir Edmund Tame, and Sir William Stafford, who married Mary Boleyn. Stafford was the son of Humphrey Stafford (died 1486).

Many sources state that Sir Thomas Greene married Fogge's daughter, Joan (or Jane), by whom he was the father of Maud Green, mother of Katherine Parr. However Fogge's will, as transcribed by Pearman in 1490, states that he has three daughters, Anne, Elizabeth and Margaret, and makes no mention of any other daughter. The official biographers of Katherine Parr, Susan E. James and Linda Porter, state that Joan was the granddaughter of Fogge. It could be possible that John disowned Joan for unknown reasons, or that she had already died before the will was made, probably after the birth of Joan's younger daughter Maud, who could've been born in 1490. The perhaps most likely explanation is that as a married woman Joan and her husband had already received her dowry. Anne, Joan's eldest daughter, was born in 1490, which might indicate a recent marriage. Joan might have been of about the same age as the three daughters mentioned in Sir John Fogge's will who were all unmarried and left sums towards their dowries and to the 'Governance and Guiding' of his wife Alice.

In the Family Chronicle of Richard Fogge of Danes Court in Tilmanstone, it is mentioned in the Fogge family pedigree that Sir John Fogge had four daughters, although only three were mentioned by name so it is likely that the unspecified daughter is Joan.

And the Widville pedigree, taken in 1480–1500, tells us that Iohanna nupta domino Thome Greene militi. This Iohanna was the daughter of Alicia nupta domino Iohanni Fogge militi. And this Alicia was the daughter of Willelmus Hault armiger by a lady Wideuille, to be more specific, the daughter of Ricardus Wideuille armiger and a filia de Bedelsgate.

Joan was their eldest daughter, born between William who died as a child and Thomas.

On 10 July 1471 Sir John Fogge, knight, was granted the wardship and marriage of Thomas, son and heir of Thomas Grene of Norton, county Northampton, knight, deceased. Like her sister Margaret, Joan also married her father's ward.

Sir John Fogge (d. 1490) might also have had another daughter not mentioned in his will, the mother of his 'nephew' (likely grandson, the word could be used also in that sense then) John ffoughler (possibly John Fuller or John Fowler), who was to inherit if his eldest son John Fogge perished without heirs. This could indicate that this daughter was also from his first marriage.

His sentimental bequests were all reserved for his two surviving sons and his wife Alice, though Gillian Draper leaves room for the possibility that he intended for a mass book to pass to one of his daughters:

Sir John Fogge had a private chapel at the manor house of Repton as well as the Fogge chapel in Ashford church. His bequests of the ecclesiastical equipment used at the chapel at the house reveal aspects of life at the manor and the way in which he considered that equipment to be both family possessions and dedicated to service in the chapel. Fogge left his wife Alice a vestment of velvet, a mass book which she was to choose from the two in the chapel, two basins of silver for the altar, a cross and two cruets all of silver and gilt, and a gilt sacring bell. Alice was to keep all of these for her whole life and most of them – apart from the velvet vestment and the mass book – were then to pass to Fogge's son John or his heirs with the intention that they should remain for the use of the chapel at Repton. The velvet vestment could have been considered a personal item with which Alice may have had some involvement, say in its embroidery, or something she might convert for her own wear, and thus unsuitable to pass on. The fact that Alice was to choose the mass book and keep it for her whole life but that it would then not pass to Fogge's son suggests two things: firstly, that she was literate, and secondly that she might herself bequeath the book to whomever she chose, perhaps a daughter, since mothers were the earliest teachers of children, both girls and boys. Sacred books were very important since the 'dynamic of literacy was religion', although parents such as the Fogges also required their children to learn pragmatic literacy for letter-writing and estate management. Eastern Kent, where the Fogges lived and held lands and manors, was an area of extensive literacy mainly because of the proximity of the Cinque Ports with their early traditions of civic record-keeping. Apart from a special decorated 'Standyng Cuppe of gilt' which Sir John bequeathed to John junior, Dame Alice was to receive all the rest of the domestic goods and chattels at Repton to keep or give away as she chose.

== Tilting helmet ==
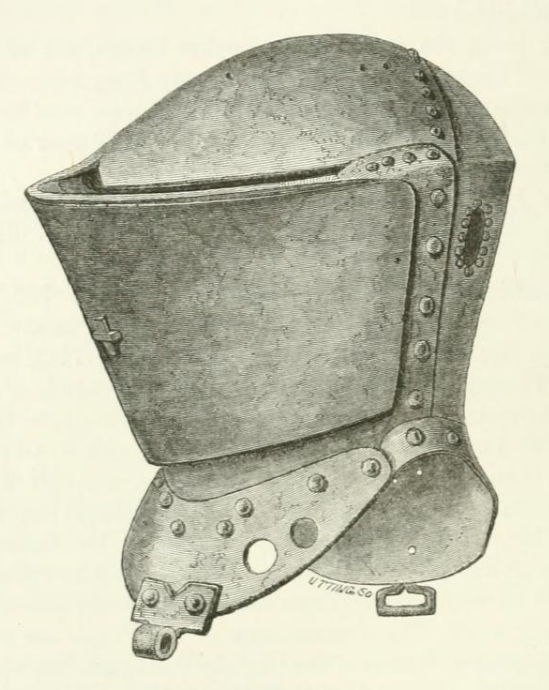
Tilting Helmet hanging above Sir John Fogge's monument in Ashsford Church

There is a tilting helmet hanging above Sir John Fogge's monument in Ashsford Church. Weight 23 lb. 15 oz.

== Edward V ==
Sir John Fogge was on the Council in January 1483. Sir Thomas More says— "Fogge had been Treasurer of the Household to Edward IV. Richard III had granted him an ostentatious pardon, but Fogge remained hostile." He was on none of Richard's comns., and was attainted by the Parliament of 1484, "leader of the Duke of Buckingham's rising in Kent." Browne, Fogge and Guildford forfeited their Kentish estates which were handed to the custody of William Mauleverer. Browne lost his head, Fogge took sanctuary. Richard sent for him, shook hands, and pardoned him, 24 February 1485.

Historian Rosemary Horrox has suggested that the mother of Richard III's daughter Katherine Plantagenet was Katherine Haute.

Sir John Fogge had been close with Edward V, one of the Princes in the Tower. John Fogge, Knight, had been appointed Chamberlain to the Prince when he was nine months old. Since John Fogge had gone into sanctuary with Elizabeth Woodville he may have been there when little 9-year-old Richard of Shrewsbury was handed over from his mother's care and into the Duke of Gloucester's, the later Richard III's care.

== Indenture and friendship ==
Gillian Draper writes:

An indenture made after his death by his widow Alice is our major source for the detailed arrangements Fogge made for his commemoration. In 1512 Alice confirmed and extended these arrangements. At this time the College apparently had more personnel than in the 1460s: a master, who was to carry out the three traditional obit services, Mass, dirige and Morrow-Mass, together with three priests, two boy choristers, two clerks and two other priests. The clerk was to ring the new Great Bell of the church in the tower which Fogge had caused to be built, and six wax tapers were to be lighted, presumably on the high altar. This was immediately adjacent to Fogge's tomb and just to the east of the choir with its sixteen stalls with their misericords, where presumably the master and the others sang. When the Great Bell was rung, it would draw the attention of the townspeople and the town's poor: after their attendance at the obit a meal of southern beef, bread and ale was to be provided for thirteen of them, plus a penny each in cash. This was entirely conventional but relatively generous, a total of 31s. 6d. was to be spent each year. However, it does give a glimpse of the link between the Fogge family and the townsfolk, people among whom he had spent many years, rather than with the wealthy and powerful several of whom appeared in the north transept windows which Fogge glazed. Alice confirmed the obit for John's soul for another sixty years and extended it to include the souls of herself, their children, Sir William Haute and his wife Joan Woodville (her parents), and their friends – those already dead and those still to die. This remembrance of friends, while traditional, echoed the concern of Sir John in founding the College and having his friends or allies – including men of the Church – painted in its windows, men with whom he had been through difficult political times and, just possibly, military activity.

In February 1462 Sir John Scott and Sir John Fogge, and Alice, Sir John Fogge's first wife and Kyriel's daughter, 'endowed two chaplains to pray for Home and Kyriel and all others slain at Northampton, St. Albans and Shirebum (Towton) — whence we may suppose that they were present together in these fields.' In November 1467 he endowed an oratory for prayers for Kyriel, Horne and Colt and all slain "for the King's right ", as before:

Nov. 18. Westminster.

Grant in frank almoin to Thomas Wilmote, vicar of the church of Asshettesford, co. Kent, of the manor and town of Dounton Weylate, co. Essex, with the advowson of the church of Dounton, the manor of Preston and Hoo, co. Sussex, lately pertaining to the priory of Okeburn, and a yearly pension of 100''s''. which the prior of Lewes is bound to render to the king from an impost lately due to the abbey of Cluny, to hold with all appurtenances quit of all farms, rents, arrears, tenths, fifteenths and actions and demands from 4 March, 1 Edward IV. to find two chaplains and two secular clerks to celebrate divine service in the said church for the good estate of the king and his kinsman George, archbishop of York, and John Fogge, knight, and Alice his wife and for their souls after death and the souls of Richard, late duke of York, the king's father, Edmund, late earl of Rutland, the king's brother, and Richard, earl of Salisbury, the king's uncle, and Thomas Kyryell, knight, Robert Hoorne and Thomas Colt, esquires, and all others of the county of Kent killed in the conflicts at Northampton, St. Albans and Shirbourne for the king's right and the good of the realm, according to the ordinances of the said John Fogge. By p.s.

Josiah C. Wedgwood writes: 'In spite of a modern novelist, there is little, save his indictment of Cook, that this close examination can bring up against a good soldier, a good comrade and a powerful official.'
