= Sir Thomas Green =

English noble (died 1506)

- Arms of Green of Greens Norton, Northamptonshire: Azure, three bucks trippant or
- Born: 1461 or 1462
- Died: 9 November 1506 (aged 44 or 45); Tower of London
- Buried: St. Bartholomew's Church, Greens Norton
- Spouse: Joan Fogge
- Issue: Maud Green; Anne Green
- Father: Sir Thomas Greene
- Mother: Maud or Matilda Throckmorton

Sir Thomas Green (1461/2 – 9 November 1506) was a member of the English gentry who died in the Tower of London, where he had been imprisoned for treason. He is best known as the grandfather of Katherine Parr, last wife of King Henry VIII.

== Family ==
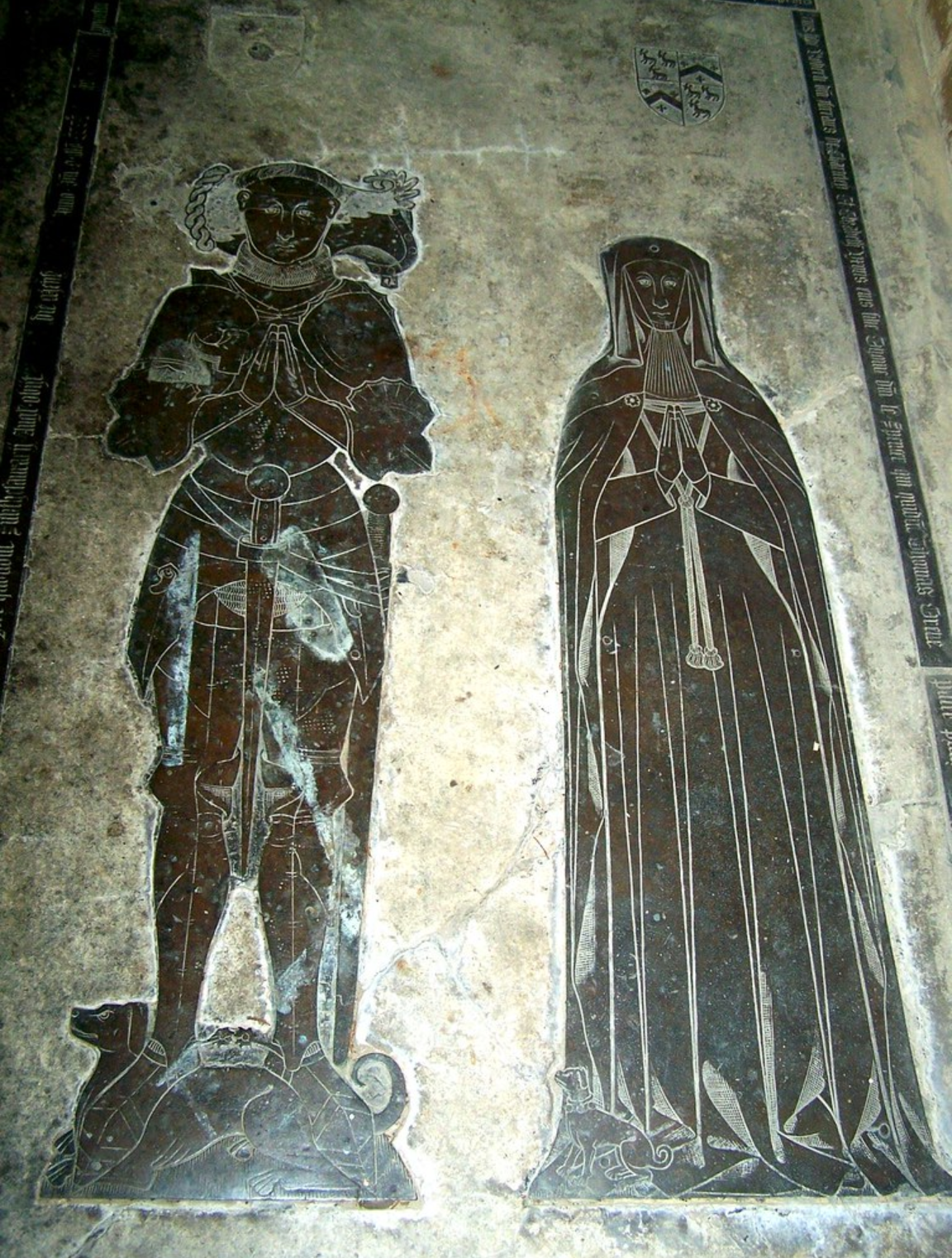
Monumental brasses of Sir Thomas Green (d.1462) and his wife Matilda Throckmorton, St. Bartholomew's Church, Greens Norton

Sir Thomas was the son of Sir Thomas Greene (d. 9 September 1462) and Matilda Throckmorton (d. 1496+).

He was the grandson of Sir Thomas Greene (d. 18 January 1462) and Philippa Ferrers, the daughter of Robert Ferrers, 4th Baron Ferrers of Chartley (d. 12 or 13 March 1413) by his wife Elizabeth Spenser, daughter of Thomas, Lord Spenser; and the great-grandson of Sir Thomas Greene (d. 14 December 1417) and Mary Talbot (d. 13 April 1434), daughter of Richard Talbot 4th Baron Lord Talbot (d. 8 or 9 September 1396) by his wife Ankaret le Strange (d. 1 June 1413), daughter of John le Strange, 4th Baron Strange (d. 12 May 1361) of Blackmere.

The Green family was descended from Alfred the Great, King of Wessex. This branch of the Green family resided at Greens Norton in Northamptonshire from the fourteenth century until the death of the last Sir Thomas Green without male heirs in 1506. In 1355, Sir Henry Green and Thomas, his son, paid 20 shillings for licence to purchase Greens Norton, then known as the manor of Norton Davy. Shortly afterwards a fine was levied of the manor to Sir Henry Green and his heirs in fee-tail. The inquisition post mortem taken after the death of Sir Henry Green's son and heir, Thomas, in 1392, found that the manor and the advowson of the church of St. Bartholomew were held of the King in capite by knight service.

== Career ==
Little is known of Sir Thomas Green's life. A brass erected to the memory of his father in St. Bartholomew's Church in Greens Norton records the latter as Sir Thomas Greene (d. 9 September 1462), the husband of Maud Throckmorton, a daughter of John Throckmorton (d. 12 April 1445), Under-Treasurer of England. Maud's mother was Eleanor de la Spine, daughter and coheiress of Guy Spyne of Coughton. Maud had married secondly Richard Middleton after the death of Sir Thomas Green. Maud was granted a licence to found a perpetual chantry in the parish church of Norton Davy, county Northampton, to celebrate divine service daily for the King, the Queen Elizabeth, herself and her two husbands, and for her son, Sir Thomas Green.

According to Susan E. James, his traits were those of any man of the time: he was conservative in religion, quarrelsome, conniving, and prone to taking the law into his own hands.

On 6 and 17 November 1505, inquisitions post mortem were taken concerning his lands in which the jurors found that he was 43 years of age at that date, and that his father, Sir Thomas Greene the elder, had died 9 September 1462 seised in fee of certain manors, and that his mother, Maud Greene, had 'entered and intruded into the premises and received all the issues thereof' from the date of his father's death until Michaelmas, 29 September 1482, 'immediately after which feast the said Thomas Grene, the son, entered and intruded without ever suing or obtaining licence from Edward IV or the present king or livery out of the king's hands, and has received the issues thereof ever since'.

He was sent to the Tower of London about that time on a trumped up charge of treason, and died there on 9 November 1506. The circumstances of the treason charge are set forth in Hardying's Chronicle:

Also shortly after the departing of [the earl] Philip, George Neville, Lord of Bergavenny, and Sir Thomas Grene, knight, were suspected to be guilty of the treason that Edmund Pole had wrought, and so cast in prison, but shortly after, when they had purged themselves of that suspicion and crime, they were delivered, albeit this knight, Sir Thomas Grene, died in prison. The other lord, for his soberness of living & true heart that he bare to his prince, was had in greater estimation than ever he was before.

In connection with the treason charge, Green was mentioned in a deposition by an unnamed person who had been urged to enter Edmund de la Pole's service, but who had determined to consult with 'astronomers' as to what would be Pole's 'likely fortune' before doing so.

An inquisition post mortem taken on 13 March 1507 found that Green had died seised of the keepership of Whittlewood Forest and the manors of Norton Davy, Boughton, Little Brampton, Pysford, Great Houghton and Great Doddington, and 30 messuages, 600 acres of land, 300 acres of meadow, 1000 acres of pasture, £20 rent and 200 acres of wood in Norton Davy, Boughton, Little Brampton, Pysford, Great Houghton, Great Doddington, Sewell, Potcote, Higham Parva alias Cold Higham, and Middleton, and that his heirs were his two daughters, Anne Greene, aged 17 years and more, and Maud Green, aged 13 years and more.

The last of his line, he left two motherless daughters. As he had no male heirs, his estates passed to the Parr and Vaux families, into which his two daughters married.

== Family ==
Greene married Joan Fogge, also sometimes called Jane, (born c. 1466), the daughter of Sir John Fogge. Sir John Fogge married twice. His first wife was Alice de Criol or Kyriell, daughter of the Yorkist Sir Thomas de Criol of Westenhanger Castle, beheaded after the Second Battle of St. Albans by order of Margaret of Anjou. By Alice de Criol, Fogge had a son and heir, John Fogge (d.1501).

Fogge's second wife, whom he married by 1458, was Alice Haute or Hawte (born circa 1444), the daughter of Sir William Haute (d.1464) of Bishopsborne, Kent, and Joan Woodville, daughter of Richard Woodville. Richard Woodville was also the father of Richard Woodville, 1st Earl Rivers, and the grandfather of Elizabeth Woodville, and Fogge's second wife, Alice Haute was thus a first cousin of the Queen, and served at court as one of her ladies-in-waiting during the 1460s. According to Horrox, Alice Haute was likely the mother of Sir John Fogge's second son, Thomas Fogge, and of the three daughters, Anne, Elisabeth, and Margaret, mentioned in Sir John Fogge's will.

By Joan Fogge, Sir Thomas Greene had two daughters:

- Anne Green (1489/90 – before 14 May 1523), who married Nicholas Vaux, 1st Baron Vaux of Harrowden (d. 14 May 1523) as his second wife. Anne Green was listed as a gentlewoman of honour to Elizabeth of York in 1503. The two were married by 29 January 1508, but after 16 November 1507. Vaux had previously been married to her sister's mother-in-law, Elizabeth FitzHugh. By Vaux, Anne was the mother of Thomas Vaux, 2nd Baron Vaux of Harrowden.
- Maud Green (6 April 1493/4 – 1 December 1531), who married Sir Thomas Parr, son of Sir William Parr by his wife Elizabeth FitzHugh. He, Thomas Parre, esquire for the body, was granted the wardship of Maud Grene, one of the daughters and heiresses of Thomas Grene, knight, tenant in chief, during her minority, with her marriage, on 25 October 1507 at Westminster. The two were married by 10 April 1508. Maud was around fourteen, having been thirteen at her father's inquisition post mortem the year before, on 13 March 1507. On 29 January 1508 Maud had still been an unwedded maiden. They were the parents of Queen Katherine Parr, Anne Herbert, Countess of Pembroke, and William Parr, 1st Marquess of Northampton.

The sisters were allowed entry without proof of age on the lands of their father on 25 October 1507. They inherited lands in Northamptonshire, Lincolnshire, Leicestershire, Buckinghamshire, Yorkshire, Kent, and Nottinghamshire. During their minority an attempt was made by Bishop Foxe, Lord Daubeney, Sir Charles Somerset, and others of Henry VI's court to obtain possession of this vast property for the Crown. This Sir Nicholas Vaux and Sir Thomas Parr succeeded in defeating, but both step-father and step-son who would become brothers-in-law were compelled on 10 July 1507 to enter into indentures for the payment of nine thousand marks (6,000l.) to the king, probably either as a fine for having married, or for license to marry wards of the crown. Of this sum 2,400 marks were paid, and the residue remitted by deed of 26 Oct. 1509, after the accession of Henry VIII.

== Bibliography ==
- Adams, Alison, ed. (1986). The Changing Face of Arthurian Romance. Cambridge: The Boydell Press.
- Carpenter, Christine (2004). "Throgmorton, John (d. 1445)". Oxford Dictionary of National Biography (online ed.). Oxford University Press. doi:10.1093/ref:odnb/27392. (Subscription, Wikipedia Library access or UK public library membership required.)
- Ellecombe, H.N. (1840). "Impressions of Brasses Received in 1842". The Rules and Proceedings of the Oxford Society for Promoting the Study of Gothic Architecture. Oxford: 45–65.
- Ellis, Henry, ed. (1812). The Chronicle of John Hardyng. London: London: F.C. and J. Rivington.
- Evans, D.L., ed. (1955). Calendar of Inquisitions Post Mortem. Vol. III. London: Her Majesty's Stationery Office.
- Fleming, Peter (2004). "Haute family (per. c.1350–1530)". Oxford Dictionary of National Biography (online ed.). Oxford University Press. doi:10.1093/ref:odnb/52786. (Subscription, Wikipedia Library access or UK public library membership required.)
- Fraser, Antonia (1993). "Katherine Parr". The Wives of Henry VIII. Vintage Publishing.
- Gairdner, James, ed. (1861). Letters and Papers Illustrative of the Reigns of Richard III and Henry VII. Vol. I. London: Longman Green.
- Harris, Barbara J. (2002). English Aristocratic Women, 1450–1550. Oxford: Oxford University Press.
- Horrox, Rosemary (2004). "Fogge, Sir John (b. in or before 1417, d. 1490)". Oxford Dictionary of National Biography (online ed.). Oxford University Press. doi:10.1093/ref:odnb/57617. (Subscription, Wikipedia Library access or UK public library membership required.)
- Pearman, A.J. (1868). History of Ashford. Ashford: H. Igglesden.
- Richardson, Douglas (2011a). Everingham, Kimball G. (ed.). Magna Carta Ancestry: A Study in Colonial and Medieval Families. Vol. I (2nd ed.). Salt Lake City: D. Richardson. ISBN 978-1449966379.
- Richardson, Douglas (2011b). Everingham, Kimball G. (ed.). Magna Carta Ancestry: A Study in Colonial and Medieval Families. Vol. II (2nd ed.). Salt Lake City: D. Richardson. ISBN 978-1449966386.
- Richardson, Douglas (2011c). Everingham, Kimball G. (ed.). Magna Carta Ancestry: A Study in Colonial and Medieval Families. Vol. III (2nd ed.). Salt Lake City: D. Richardson. ISBN 978-1449966393.
- Richardson, Douglas (2011d). Everingham, Kimball G. (ed.). Magna Carta Ancestry: A Study in Colonial and Medieval Families. Vol. IV (2nd ed.). Salt Lake City: D. Richardson. ISBN 978-1460992708.
- T.G.F. (1863). "Family Chronicle of Richard Fogge of Danes Court in Tilmanstone". Archaeologia Cantiana. V. Kent Archaeological Society.
- Whellan, Francis (1874). "History, Topography and Directory of Northamptonshire". Archaeologia Cantiana (2nd ed.). London: Whittaker and Co.
