= Alice Haute =

English courtier (1492–1531)

Alice Haute, Lady Fogge
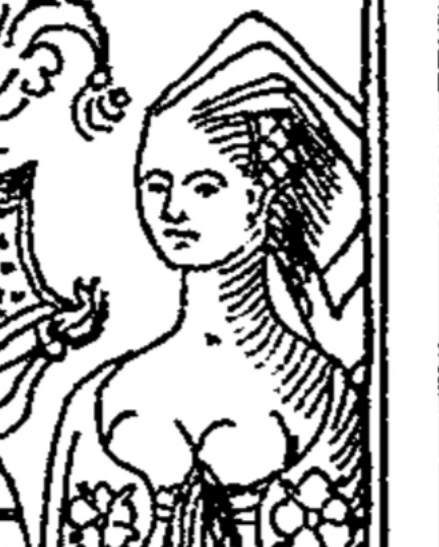
- Close-up of a sketch of Alice, depicted on the tomb of herself, her husband, and his first wife.
- Born: c.1444 Kent, England
- Died: 6/16 August 1512; Kent, England
- Buried: Ashford, St. Mary's church.
- Noble family: Haute (by birth); Fogge (by marriage)
- Spouse: John Fogge
- Issue: Thomas Fogge; Anne Fogge; Elizabeth Fogge; Margaret Fogge; Joan Fogge
- Father: William Haute (MP)
- Mother: Joan Wydeville

Alice Haute, Lady Fogge (c.1444 – 6/16 August 1512) was an English noblewoman. She was the second wife of Sir John Fogge, and the great-grandmother of Katherine Parr, the sixth wife of King Henry VIII of England.

== Early life and family ==
Alice was born on around 1444 in Kent, England as the daughter of Sir William Haute (1390–1462) of Bishopsbourne, Kent, an English politician, and Joan Wydeville, daughter of Richard Wydeville (1385–1441) (of Grafton, Northamptonshire and Maidstone, Kent) and his wife Joan Bittlesgate. Her mother was the sister of Richard Woodville, 1st Earl Rivers, making Alice a first cousin to Elizabeth Woodville, Queen Consort to Edward IV of England.

Her father had already developed a friendship with her maternal grandfather, and having served again for the Shire in 1432 supported Wydeville at his election in 1433. Together they attended the council of spring 1434 at which Gloucester, complaining of the progress of the French war, fell into dissent with John of Lancaster, who could expect Wydeville's loyalty as his chamberlain. Although his overseas service is not well understood, from the earlier 1430s onwards Haute held numerous commissions for array, musters for France, oyer and terminer, escapes from prisons, smuggling, et cetera, and his continuing commissions for the peace.

Alice had four sisters, and three brothers. They were;

- Sir William Haute. In his will, his father leaves him the bed with green hangings in the parlour, with the furniture belonging to it, together with the feather-bed and one pair of "fustianes"—blankets made of cotton and flax—also the bed of red worsted in the great chamber beyond the parlor, with all the hangings there, together with the feather-bed and one pair of fustians, one piece of silver and gold with a cover of the same, called "le Hert"—important pieces of plate were sometimes given names—two silver saltcellars, one with the "stremes"—rays of the sun—gilt, whereof one with and one without a cover, six silver spoons, one pair of sheets of the best Raynes—linen woven at Rennes in Brittany—and the rest of his reliquaries not bequeathed elsewhere. To Joan, wife of his son William, Sir William bequeathed one goblet of silver and gilt and one standing mazer of silver and gilt, covered. To William, son of his son William, a little standing piece of silver and gilt, swagged and covered.
- Anne Haute. In keeping with the customs of the time, young Anne Haute was sent to live in the household of a family friend or patron for the purpose of education. Most likely, her mistress was the wife of an influential English official stationed in Calais. In 1468, Sir John Paston, one of the knights accompanying Princess Margaret—Edward IV’s sister—on her journey to Bruges for her marriage to the Duke of Burgundy, met Anne Haute, either in Bruges or at Calais. This encounter probably occurred through his friend and her cousin Anthony Wydville, Lord Scales. Sir John fell in love with her, though he was undoubtedly aware that she was “right nygh to the queen's blood.” On his return trip, he wrote an unsent letter—which has since been preserved among the Paston family papers—in which he begged to know the intentions of her and her best friends regarding his suit. In a postscript he noted, “Mastresse Annes, I am proud that ye can reed Inglyshe.” Anne accepted his advances, and on April 3, 1469, Sir John’s mother sent him a gold button set with a diamond to give to her. In doing so, she reminded him that, as he was as bound to Anne as if they were married, he had a duty to remain true to her, while wisely advising him to delay marriage until his fortunes were more secure, for the obligations were immense and failure could lead to severe criticism. Meanwhile, Lord Rivers and Lord Scales—Anne’s uncle and cousin—rushed to support Sir John in his conflict with the Dukes of Norfolk and Suffolk over the inheritance of Sir John Fastolf’s lands. However, the romance did not progress smoothly. Sir John Paston proved to be unstable, extravagant, and indecisive, and it soon became clear from the Paston letters that both he and Anne Haute found the marriage contract objectionable. Nevertheless, in the eyes of the Church the contract was binding, requiring a Papal dispensation—accompanied by steep fees—to ease Anne’s conscience. Family correspondence sporadically mentions consultations with the Queen, Papal representatives, Anne’s brother Richard Haute, Cardinal Bouchier, and the Lord Chamberlain (Lord Hastings), but it was not until 1477 that the contract was finally annulled. Sir John Paston eventually died a bachelor. In her father's will, Anne is left the same amount of bedclothes as her brother Edward, one flat piece of silver, covered, and one pair of sheets of Raynes.
- Joan Haute. Joane, sister to Alice Haute was married to Sir George Darell of Littlecote (d. 1474), Keeper of the Great Wardrobe to King Edward IV, and was the mother of Edward Darell. In his will, her father Sir William leaves to 'his daughter Johan' one bed of linen with "okylevys"—a canopy tester and a coverlet of the same suite embroidered with oak leaves—three curtains of white linen cloth, one feather-bed, a transom, two pairs of sheets, and one pair of fustians, one standing piece of silver and gilt with a hand holding a pineapple, a powder box of silver and one pair of sheets of Raynes.
- Richard Haute. On February 20, 1472, Queen Elizabeth appointed her cousin Richard as part of a group of courtiers tasked with being tutors and advisors to the young Edward, Prince of Wales, until he turned fourteen. This role would place them in significant danger, and some would even lose their lives because of it. Richard is mentioned twice in the Paston Letters as assisting his sister Anne Haute in negotiations with Sir John Paston to release her from her marriage contract—once in 1471 and again in 1473, when he and his brother-in-law, Sir John Fogge, presented their case to Dr. Wyntborne, the Church's representative. To his son Richard, Sir William Haute left one bed—a canopy tester—three curtains and one coverlet of worsted, one feather-bed, a "transonn"—transom, a bolster—two pairs of sheets, one pair of fustians, and two pillows, a long gown of violet, furred with beaver, one great rose covered, with a gilt knob, six silver spoons and one pair of sheets of Raynes. It was Richard Haute who in November 1475 escorted Margaret of Anjou from London, where she had been a prisoner for five years, to Sandwich on the coast of Kent whence she crossed the Channel for her final exile from England. He was probably the Richard Haute who was sheriff 18 and 22 Edward IV, 1477/8–1478/9 and 1481/2–1482/3, and who represented Canterbury in Parliament in 1478. He was also Justice of the Peace for Kent 1479–1480. In April, 1483, when King Edward IV died, he was at Ludlow with the boy prince. A part of the little cavalcade under the leadership of Anthony, Lord Rivers—his uncle and Haute's cousin—acting on the orders of the Queen and the council, they departed from the castle to escort the young King Edward V to London. However, at Stony Stratford, they were confronted by Richard, Duke of Gloucester. Although he might not yet have been driven by the ruthless ambition that would eventually lead him to claim the throne as Richard III, he was undoubtedly strongly opposed to the influence of the Woodville family. Sir Thomas More, in his 1513 work Life and Reign of Edward the Fifth, written just thirty years after the events, recounts that Lord Richard Grey, the King's half-brother, along with "Sir" Richard Haute and Sir Thomas Vaughan, who had served as the king's personal attendant since his birth, were apprehended in front of the tearful young King. He lists "Richard Hause" as one of those executed by beheading at Pomfret on June 13, 1483, alongside his first cousin and the King's uncle, Anthony, Lord Rivers. Sir Thomas More tells a harrowing tale of how he was "buryed naked in the monastery at Poumfret", according to Edward Hall's Chronicle. Yet Richard Hawte is not named where the story appears in More's History of King Richard the Third, according to William Rastell's 1557 edition from More's manuscript. In fact, Richard Haute lived to take part in Buckingham's rebellion against Richard III, for which his lands were seized on 18 October 1483, and he himself attainted. To the last, he had been trusted by his Wydville relations, Anthony Woodville made Richard Haute, Esq. an executor of his will. Richard Haute (d. 8 April 1487) of Ightham in Kent married, in 1469, Elizabeth Tyrell (d. 1507), daughter of Sir Thomas Tyrrell of Heron in Essex, and the widow of Sir Robert Darcy of Maldon and Danbury in Essex (d. 2 November 1469). Richard Haute died on Palm Sunday in 1487, leaving his heir Edward aged eleven. He also had two daughters – Isabel, who married Ralph St. Leger, and Anne, who married firstly Thomas Peyton of Isleham in Cambridgeshire and secondly John Gaynesford of Crowhurst in Surrey. By his daughters he was the grandfather of Anne Gainsford and Anthony St. Leger.
- Edward Haute. In his will, Sir William leaves him one hanging bed–a canopy tester—three curtains, one coverlet, one feather-bed, one transom, two pairs of sheets, one pair of blankets and two pillows, a gown of blood colour, furred with beaver, one piece of silver gilt, swagged, and six silver spoons. Edward Haute was one of the very few people who escorted the body of his first cousin Elizabeth Woodville on her final journey from Bermondsey Abbey to Windsor. The former Queen had died on Friday 8 June 1492, and her body was conveyed by boat on Whit Sunday—10 June—two days later. It was the twenty-seventh anniversary of her coronation, and she was accompanied by Prior Ingilby, Dr. Brent, Edward Haute, and two gentlewomen. One of whom was her husband’s natural daughter, Grace Plantagenet, the other was an unnamed noblewoman.
- Elizabeth Haute, who married Thomas Digges. To his daughter Elizabeth, Sir William left a bed as to his daughter Anne and one standing piece of silver with a knob of gilt.
- Margaret Haute. 'To his daughter Margaret,' one canopy of white linen cloth with curtains of the same, one coverlet, one feather-bed, one transom, two pairs of sheets, one pair of blankets and two pillows and one base piece of silver, covered.
- James Haute, who married Katherine and had Henry, Edward, Richard, Margaret, Alan and Alicia. In his will, Sir William leaves to his son James Haute the same as to Edward in the way of bedclothes, plus a short gown of violet, furred with beaver, one base piece of silver and gilt, standing, with a "Borage braunche"—ornamented with a branch of borage, a plant—and six spoons. Rosemary Horrox has suggested that his wife Katherine was the mother of Richard III's natural daughter Katherine Plantagenet, based on the otherwise unexplained grant of an annuity from Richard, Duke of Gloucester given Katherine Haute to the sum of £5. James Haute, who did not rebel, was granted the lands seized from his brother Richard Haute after Buckingham's Rebellion by Richard III.

After her marriage to Edward IV, Alice's cousin Elizabeth Woodville brought her favourite female relatives to court. Alice Haute was one of her five ladies-in-waiting during the 1460s.

Edward IV's marriage to the widowed Elizabeth Woodville took place secretly and, though there is no documentary evidence of the date, it is traditionally said to have taken place at her family home in Northamptonshire on 1 May 1464.

In April 1464 Sir John Fogge was made supervisor of the deer and of hunting in Kent, and he and Alice are to have a tun of Gascon wine at Christmas. Next year Alice, Lady Fogge was made one of the new Queen’s Ladies-in-Waiting with £20 a year. In 1465 the Treasurer of the Household was granted during office all the profits of the Mint; and, at his request, an annual fair was granted at Ashford. In 1466 all the profits of coinage in Cornwall and Devon, of mines and of subsidies on tin shipped were obtained by the Treasurer "during office" for the expenses of the Household.

== Marriage and issue ==
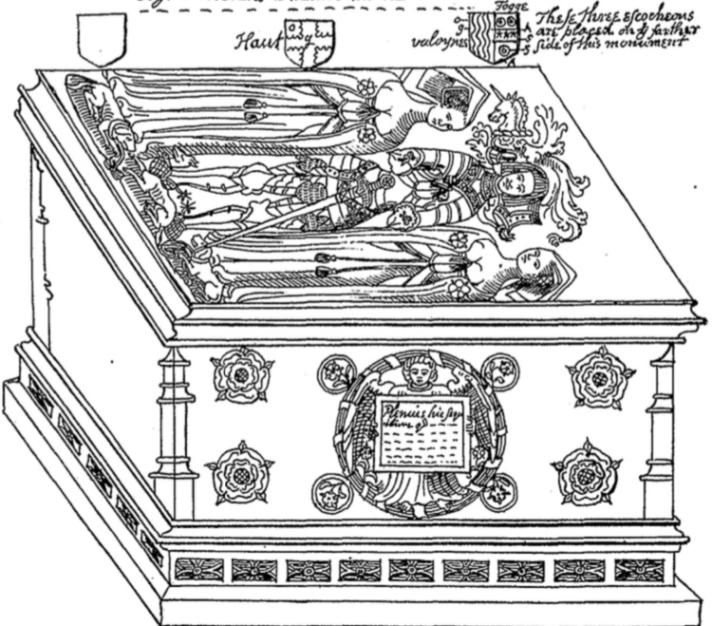
Sketch of the tomb of Alice, her husband, and his first wife Alice Kyriell.

In about 1458, Alice married Sir John Fogge as his second wife. He was an English courtier, soldier and supporter of the Woodvilles under Edward IV. He the son of John Fogge, esquire, the second surviving son of Sir Thomas Fogge (d. 13 July 1407) and Joan de Valence (d. 8 July 1420). Their marriage carried the Haute manor of Ashenfield in Waltham.

The couple had two sons and four daughters:

- William Fogge, died as a child.
- Thomas Fogge (d. 16 August 1512), esquire, of Ashford, Great Mongeham, Sutton Farm (in Sutton), Tunford (in Thanington), and Walmer, Kent, Sergeant Porter of Calais to Henry VII and Henry VIII. He married before 9 December 1509 Eleanor Browne, daughter of Robert Browne, esquire, and granddaughter of Sir Thomas Browne. They had two daughters, Alice (wife of Edward Scott and Robert Oxenbridge, Knight.) and Anne (wife of William Scott and Henry Isham). He was buried in the church at Ashford. He left a will dated 4 August 1512, proved 16 October 1512 (P.C.C. 9 Fetiplace). Eleanor married secondly Sir William Kempe of Ollantigh of Kent, and was a gentlewoman in the household of Queen Mary, she died on 16 September 1559.
- Anne Fogge.
- Elizabeth Fogge.
- Margaret Fogge, who married her father's ward, Sir Humphrey Stafford (d. 22 September 1545) of Cottered and Rushden, Hertfordshire, by whom she was the mother of three sons and three daughters, including Sir Humphrey Stafford, who married Margaret Tame, daughter of Sir Edmund Tame, and Sir William Stafford, who married Mary Boleyn. Sir Humphrey Stafford was the son of Humphrey Stafford (died 1486).
- Joan Fogge, who married Sir Thomas Green, and became the maternal grandmother to Katherine Parr the sixth wife of King Henry VIII of England. It has long remained uncertain if Joan was their daughter. Many sources state that Sir Thomas Greene married Sir John Fogge and Alice Haute's daughter Joan, by whom he was the father of Maud Green, mother of Katherine Parr. However, Sir John Fogge's will of 1490, as transcribed by Pearman in his 1868 History of Ashford, only mentions his three unmarried daughters, the three being Anne, Elizabeth and Margaret, and makes no mention of any other daughter. Two biographers of Katherine Parr, Susan E. James and Linda Porter, believe that Joan was the granddaughter of Fogge. It has been thought possible that John disowned Joan for unknown reasons, or that she had already died before the will was made, probably after the birth of her younger daughter Maud, who could have been born in 1490. The inquisition post mortem of her father, Sir Thomas Green, however, makes it clear that Maud Green was born in 1493/4 while her elder sister Anne was born in 1489/90. The perhaps most likely explanation is that as a married woman Joan and her husband had already received her dowry.

In the Family Chronicle of Richard Fogge of Danes Court in Tilmanstone, it is mentioned in the Fogge family pedigree that the couple had four daughters, although only three were mentioned by name, so it is possible that the unspecified daughter is Joan.

And the Widville pedigree, taken in 1480–1500, tells us that Iohanna nupta domino Thome Greene militi. This Iohanna was the daughter of Alicia nupta domino Iohanni Fogge militi. And this Alicia was the daughter of Willelmus Hault armiger by a lady Wideuille, to be more specific, the daughter of Ricardus Wideuille armiger and a filia de Bedelsgate.

Joan was their eldest daughter, born between William who died as a child and Thomas.

On 10 July 1471 Sir John Fogge was granted the wardship and marriage of Thomas, son and heir of Thomas Grene of Norton, county Northampton, knight, deceased. Sir John and Alice Fogge's daughter Joan also married her father's ward.

== Stained glass window ==
In the north window of the gallery was a shield of the arms of Fogge impaling Haut

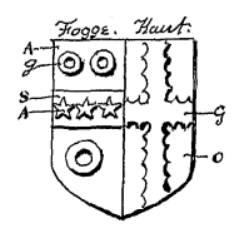
In the north window of the gallery was a shield of the arms of Fogge impaling Haut

== Death and burial ==
Alice Haute died of unknown causes on 6 or 16 August 1512 aged about 68, around the time her presumed great-granddaughter Katherine Parr was born. She was buried with her husband, and his first wife, on the North side of the altar between the chancel and Fogge Chapel at Ashford, St. Mary's church. The original ornaments of their tomb have been stripped. However, a sketch of their memorial brasses is still extant. Sir Edward Dering, the Kentish antiquary, sketched the three brasses in 1631.

== Coat of arms ==
Argent, on a fess between three annulets Sable three mullets pierced of the first—for Fogge. Or, a cross engrailed Gules—for Haute.

== Obit and her husband's will, and other bequests ==
Alice ordered an obit. In an indenture of August 18, an. 3 Henry VIII (1512), whereby Dame Alice Fogge enfeoffs John Roper and others of four acres in trust for a yearly "Obbitte" of 10s. 6d. for Sir John, her late husband, herself, and their children, and for other chanties of Ashford Church. Alice writes:

for the soule of the seid Sir John Fogge, Knyght, and for the soule of me, the seid Alice his wife, for the soules of William Hawte and Jane his wife, our children soules and all our Friends soules that ben past and to come

In his will, Sir John Fogge left her:

My Wife shall have thereof a Vestment of Velvet, a Masseboke, which she will chuse of the Twain, Two Basenes of Silver for the Altar, a Crosse of Silver and Gylt, Two Crewets Silver and Gylt, and a Sakeryng Bell Gylt, which Basenes, Crosse, Crewets, and Sakeryng Bell I will my said wife shall have Time of her Life, if She live Sole, and after her decease to remain unto my said Son, or to his heirs then being alyve to th' use of the said Chapel

And the 'Governance and Guiding' of his three unmarried daughters.

Gillian Draper suggests that he might have intended for the mass book to pass to one of his daughters by not specifying it for the chapel.

Alice's father, William Haute, made his will on May 9, 1462, and it was proved on October 4 of that year. To his daughter Alice, wife of John Fogge, knight, he gave one counterpane of red woolen cloth, furred with miniver and one standing piece of silver and gilt, pounced with images.

== Bibliography ==
- Adams, Alison, ed. (1986). The Changing Face of Arthurian Romance. Cambridge: The Boydell Press.
- Fleming, Peter (2004). "Haute family (per. c.1350–1530)". Oxford Dictionary of National Biography (online ed.). Oxford University Press. doi:10.1093/ref:odnb/52786. (Subscription, Wikipedia Library access or UK public library membership required.)
- Harris, Barbara J. (2002). English Aristocratic Women, 1450–1550. Oxford: Oxford University Press.
- Hitchin-Kemp, Frederick (1902). A General History of the Kemp and Kempe Families. London: The Leadenhall Press.
- Horrox, Rosemary (2004). "Fogge, Sir John (b. in or before 1417, d. 1490)". Oxford Dictionary of National Biography (online ed.). Oxford University Press. doi:10.1093/ref:odnb/57617. (Subscription, Wikipedia Library access or UK public library membership required.)
- Paget, Gerald. The Lineage and Ancestry of H.R.H. Prince Charles, Prince of Wales. Vol. I. p. 95.
- Richardson, Douglas (2011). Everingham, Kimball G. (ed.). Magna Carta Ancestry: A Study in Colonial and Medieval Families. Vol. I (2nd ed.). Salt Lake City. ISBN 978-1449966379.
- Richardson, Douglas (2011). Everingham, Kimball G. (ed.). Plantagenet Ancestry: A Study in Colonial and Medieval Families. Vol. II (2nd ed.). Salt Lake City. ISBN 978-1449966348.
- Richardson, Douglas (2011). Everingham, Kimball G. (ed.). Magna Carta Ancestry: A Study in Colonial and Medieval Families. Vol. III (2nd ed.). Salt Lake City. ISBN 978-1449966393.
- Richardson, Douglas (2011). Everingham, Kimball G. (ed.). Magna Carta Ancestry: A Study in Colonial and Medieval Families. Vol. IV (2nd ed.). Salt Lake City. ISBN 978-1460992708.
- Smith, Herbert L. (1859). "Notes of Brasses, Memorial Windows and Escutcheons Formerly Existing in Ashford and Willesborough Churches". Archaeologia Cantiana. II. London: Kent Archaeological Society: 103–110.

== Sources ==
- Fraser, Antonia (1993). "Katherine Parr". The Wives of Henry VIII. Vintage Publishing.
- James, Susan (2009). Katherine Parr: Henry VIII's Last Love.
- Pearman, A.J. (1868). History of Ashford. Ashford: H Igglesden. p. 123.
- Porter, Linda (2010). Katherine, the Queen: The Remarkable Life of Katherine Parr, the Last Wife of Henry VIII.
