= Nicholas Vaux, 1st Baron Vaux of Harrowden =

English soldier and courtier

Nicholas Vaux
- 1st Baron Vaux of Harrowden
- Arms of Nicholas Vaux, 1st Baron Vaux of Harrowden: Chequy argent and gules, on a chevron azure, three roses or
- Born: c. 1460
- Died: 14 May 1523 (aged 62–63)
- Noble family: Vaux
- Spouses: Elizabeth FitzHugh; Anne Green
- Issue: by Elizabeth: Katherine Vaux; Alice Vaux; Anne Vaux by Anne: Thomas Vaux, 2nd Baron Vaux of Harrowden; William Vaux; Margaret Vaux; Bridget Vaux; Maud Vaux
- Father: Sir William Vaux of Harrowden
- Mother: Katherine Peniston

Nicholas Vaux, 1st Baron Vaux of Harrowden (/ˈvɔːks/ VAWKS; c. 1460 – 14 May 1523) was a soldier and courtier in England and an early member of the House of Commons. He was the son of Lancastrian loyalists William Vaux of Harrowden and Katherine Penyson (or Peniston as she is sometimes called in later sources), a lady of the household of Queen Margaret of Anjou, wife of the Lancastrian king, Henry VI of England. Katherine was a daughter of Gregorio Panizzone of Courticelle (modern Cortiglione), in Piedmont, Italy which was at that time subject to King René of Anjou, father of Queen Margaret of Anjou, as ruler of Provence. He grew up during the years of Yorkist rule and later served under the founder of the Tudor dynasty, Henry VII.

== Overview ==
Vaux's mother, Katherine, an attendant on Margaret of Anjou, remained constant to her mistress when others forsook the Lancastrian cause. Katherine's husband, William Vaux, whom she had married not long before she obtained her letters of denization, was attainted in 1461 and later slain at the Battle of Tewkesbury in May 1471.

Despite her husband's misfortune, Katherine Vaux remained loyal to her mistress: she stayed by the Queen during her imprisonment in the Tower of London, and on Margaret's release in 1476 went with her into exile (as she had done earlier in the 1460s), living with her until her death six years later. Katherine's two children did not share either her confinement or her travels abroad; instead, Nicholas Vaux and his sister Joan, were brought up in the household of Lady Margaret Beaufort (mother of Henry VII), without charge, even though Edward IV restored two manors to the family for the maintenance of him and his sister.

Katherine's devotion was rewarded after the triumph of Henry VII at Bosworth, where Nicholas Vaux, as a protégé of Lady Margaret Beaufort, probably fought under her husband Thomas Stanley, 1st Earl of Derby; the petition for the reversal of the attainder on Vaux's father and the forfeiture of his property was accepted by the King in the Parliament of 1485, and not long after Vaux was named to the commission of the peace for his home county.

== Politics ==
Vaux fought for Henry VII at Stoke and Blackheath, being knighted on the field for his service in both battles. Not only was he active and diligent in local government but he was also frequently at court attending all the great state occasions at home and abroad until his death. In 1500, he appeared at a tournament in costume as a Turk or Saracen. In 1511 he entertained Henry VIII at Harrowden.

It was as a soldier and diplomat, however, that he made his mark. Given the important command at Guisnes, he distinguished himself during the Tournai campaign in 1513 and then in the missions (he had had some earlier experiences in negotiating, chiefly with Burgundy) to the French King about the English withdrawal and the several royal marriage treaties.

Later, Vaux was one of the devisers of the Field of the Cloth of Gold. His sister, Joan, had also benefited from the change of dynasty: she entered the royal household, became governess to Henry VII's daughters and married successively Richard Guildford and the father of Nicholas Poyntz and Anthony Poyntz.

Vaux was a candidate for election to Parliament, although in the absence of so many returns for the early Tudor period he is known to have been a Member only in 1515 when he and John Hussey took a memorandum on certain Acts from the Commons up to the Lords. Presumably, he sat for his own shire on this occasion as he was afterwards appointed to the Northamptonshire commission for the subsidy which he had helped to grant.

== Missions to France ==
On 4 September 1514, Vaux with his second wife Anne Green were part of the delegation tasked with delivering Princess Mary, the king's sister, to Abbeville in France to be married to King Louis XII of France. He also was present with his second wife Anne Green at the Field of the Cloth of Gold in 1520 where he attended upon the King and Queen Katherine of Aragon. He was joined by Thomas Parr, his wife Maud Green, and his brother William Parr of Horton.

== Marriages & issue ==
Vaux married twice:

- First to Elizabeth FitzHugh (d. 29 January 1508), widow of William Parr of Kendal, and daughter of Henry FitzHugh, Baron FitzHugh of Ravensworth, by his wife Alice Neville, a niece of Cecily Neville, Duchess of York. The wedding took place most likely after the 1485 Battle of Bosworth when Henry Tudor (later King Henry VII) defeated Richard III. The union was most likely planned to secure the allegiance of the FitzHugh family to the new Tudor dynasty as Henry VII's wife, Elizabeth of York, was a granddaughter of Cecily Neville, Duchess of York. By his first wife he had three daughters:
  - Katherine Vaux (c.1490–1571), who married George Throckmorton of Coughton Court in Warwickshire, and had issue;
  - Alice Vaux (d.1543), who, in about 1501, married Richard Sapcote, without issue;
  - Anne Vaux, who married Thomas Le Strange (1493–1545) and had issue.
- Second, shortly after the death of his first wife, he married Anne Green (who predeceased him), a daughter and co-heiress of Thomas Green of Boughton and Green's Norton, Northamptonshire, by his wife Joan Fogge. Anne Green was the aunt of Queen Katherine Parr (whose mother was Maud Green), the sixth wife of King Henry VIII. By his second wife he had two sons and three daughters:
  - Thomas Vaux, 2nd Baron Vaux of Harrowden (1510 – October 1556), eldest son and heir, who, in about 1523, married Elizabeth Cheney (1505–1556), a granddaughter of his father's first wife (Elizabeth Cheney was a daughter of Thomas Cheney of Irtlingburgh by his wife Anne Parr, a daughter of William Parr by his second wife Elizabeth FitzHugh).
  - William Vaux (d. May 1523), who died unmarried.
  - Margaret Vaux, who married Francis Pulteney (1502 – c. 17 May 1548) of Misterton. Had issue. She married secondly to Francis Verney (1531/34–59), of Salden in Mursley, Bucks. and London. No issue.
  - Bridget Vaux, who in about 1538 married Maurice Welsh;
  - Maud Vaux (d. 14 April 1569), who married John Fermor of Easton Neston in Northamptonshire, by whom she had issue.

== In popular culture ==
Vaux is a character in William Shakespeare's Henry VIII.

== Ancestry ==
Ancestors of Nicholas Vaux, 1st Baron Vaux of Harrowden

8. William Vaux
4. Sir William Vaux of Great Harrowden
9. Eleanor Drakeston
2. Sir William Vaux, Knt.
20. Sir Reginald Lucy of Dallington, Knt.
10. Sir Walter Lucy of Dallington, Knt.
21. Margaret Mowbray
5. Maud Lucy
22. Sir Warin l'Arcedekne
11. Eleanor L'Arcedekne
23. Elizabeth Talbot
1. Nicholas Vaux, 1st Baron Vaux of Harrowden
6. George Peniston of Courtesello
3. Katherine Penyson

== Notes ==
Peerage of England
New creation	Baron Vaux of Harrowden; 1523	Succeeded by Thomas Vaux
