= Elizabeth FitzHugh =

English noblewoman and lady-in-waiting

- Lady Parr of Kendal; Lady Vaux of Harrowden
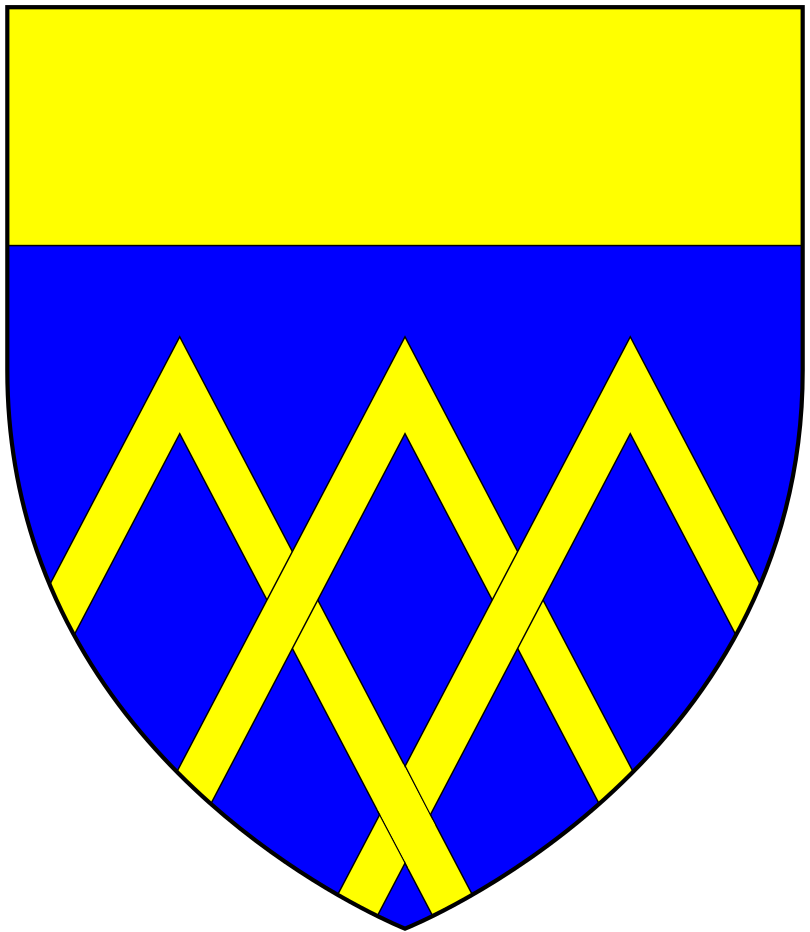
- Arms of FitzHugh: Azure, three chevrons interlaced in base or a chief of the last
- Born: 1455/65
- Died: before 10 July 1507
- Noble family: FitzHugh (by birth); Parr (by marriage); Vaux (by marriage)
- Spouses: Sir William Parr of Kendal; Nicholas Vaux, 1st Baron Vaux of Harrowden
- Issue: Anne Parr; Sir Thomas Parr; William Parr, 1st Baron Parr of Horton; John Parr; Katherine Vaux; Alice Vaux; Anne Vaux
- Father: Henry FitzHugh, 5th Baron Fitzhugh of Ravensworth
- Mother: Alice Neville

Elizabeth FitzHugh (1455/65 – before 10 July 1507) also known as Lady Elizabeth Parr, was an English noblewoman and lady-in-waiting to her cousin, Anne Neville, Queen Consort of King Richard III. She was grandmother of Katherine Parr, the sixth queen consort to King Henry VIII, and her siblings Anne Herbert, Countess of Pembroke, and William Parr, 1st Marquess of Northampton.

== Family ==
Elizabeth was possibly born at the family's ancestral home, Ravensworth Castle in North Yorkshire, England. She was the daughter of Henry FitzHugh, 5th Baron FitzHugh of Ravensworth. and his wife Lady Alice Neville, daughter of Richard Neville, 5th Earl of Salisbury and Alice Montagu, 5th Countess of Salisbury suo jure, only daughter and heiress of Thomas Montacute, 4th Earl of Salisbury and Lady Eleanor Holland. Her paternal grandparents were William FitzHugh, 4th Baron FitzHugh and Margery Willoughby.

Through her grandfather, the Earl of Salisbury, she was a niece of Richard Neville, 16th Earl of Warwick (known in history as "Warwick, the Kingmaker"), and grandniece of Cecily Neville, Duchess of York (the mother of King Edward IV and King Richard III).

Elizabeth had nine siblings, including Lady Alice FitzHugh and Richard, 6th Baron FitzHugh (c. 1456 – 20 November 1487) who married Elizabeth Burgh, daughter of Sir Thomas Burgh, 1st Baron Burgh of Gainsborough and his wife, Margaret de Ros. Their son, George FitzHugh, inherited the barony but after his death in 1513, the barony fell in abeyance between Elizabeth and her older sister, Alice. This abeyance continues today between the two families.

The current co-heirs to the barony are:

- Rachel Douglas-Home, 27th Baroness Dacre née Brand (b. 1929)
- Hon. Tessa Ogilvie Thompson née Brand (b. 1934)
- Francis Brand, 7th Viscount Hampden (b. 1970)
- William Herbert, 18th Earl of Pembroke (b. 1978)

== Life ==
Elizabeth is said to have had an easy-going and pleasure-loving disposition. After her husband Sir William Parr died in 1483, Elizabeth, who was possibly around twenty-three at the time, was left with four small children. As a widow, Elizabeth's life revolved around the court. Elizabeth served as lady-in-waiting to Richard III's queen consort, her cousin, Anne Neville. Elizabeth would be second in a four generation span of family that would serve England's Queens which started in 1483 with her mother, the redoubtable Alice Neville, Lady FitzHugh. Her granddaughter, Anne Parr would continue the tradition by becoming lady-in-waiting to all six of Henry VIII's wives. Even Anne's sister, Katherine Parr, who later became Queen served in the household of the Princess Mary until she caught the eye of King Henry.

After the overthrow of the House of York, Elizabeth made a second marriage with a protégé of Margaret Beaufort, Sir Nicholas Vaux (later Baron Vaux), which is reputed to have saved the family fortunes.

== Marriages and Issue ==
She married first Sir William Parr of Kendal, a man maybe 28 years her senior. William was a Knight of the Garter who was held high in favour with King Edward IV, who by marriage was a cousin to him. He fought with the Nevilles on the Yorkist side at the Battle of Edgecote Moor. Elizabeth did not give birth to her first child until she was aged about sixteen. Elizabeth and William had the following children:

- Anne Parr (d. 1513), who married Sir Thomas Cheney of Irthlingborough. Their daughter Elizabeth married Thomas Vaux, 2nd Baron Vaux of Harrowden, son of Nicholas Vaux, 1st Baron Vaux of Harrowden by his second wife, Anne Green. This Anne was sister of Maud Green, who married Anne's brother Thomas Parr (below), meaning Anne Green was both aunt and mother-in-law to Elizabeth.
- Sir Thomas Parr (c. 1483 – 1517), who was the eldest son, was knighted and was sheriff of Northamptonshire in 1509; he was master of the wards and comptroller to Henry VIII. He was rich, owing to his succeeding, in 1512, to half the estates of his cousin, Lord FitzHugh, and also to his marriage with Maud Green, daughter and coheiress of Sir Thomas Green of Boughton and Greens Norton in Northamptonshire. He died on 12 November 1518 and was buried in the church of the Blackfriars in London. His widow died on 1 September 1532 and was buried beside him. Of their children, Katherine Parr, Queen Consort of Henry VIII, and, William Parr (afterwards Marquess of Northampton) are well known; while a daughter, Anne, married William Herbert, 1st Earl of Pembroke of the tenth creation.
- William Parr, 1st Baron Parr of Horton (c. 1483 – 1547), the second son, was knighted on 25 October 1513, was sheriff of Northamptonshire in 1518 and 1522 and, after his niece Katherine Parr's promotion to Queen Consort, he became her chamberlain. On 23 December 1543 he was created Baron Parr of Horton, Northamptonshire. He died on 10 September 1547 and was buried at Horton (for his tomb, see Bridges, Northamptonshire, i. 370). By Mary, daughter of Sir William Salisbury, he left four daughters.
- John Parr (d. 8 September 1508), married Constance, daughter of Sir Henry Vere of Addington, Surrey. They had no issue.

After the death of Sir William Parr, Elizabeth married Sir Nicholas Vaux as his first wife. Their issue includes:

- Katherine Vaux (c. 1490 – c. 1571), married Sir George Throckmorton of Coughton and had issue.
- Alice Vaux (d. 1543), married Sir Richard Sapcote c. 1501. They had at least one child, Anne.
- Anne Vaux, married Sir Thomas Lestrange (1493–1545) and had issue.

== Coat of arms ==
Azure, three chevrons interlaced in base Or a chief of the last—Arms of FitzHugh. These arms would later be quartered by her grandchildren Queen Katherine Parr and brother William Parr, 1st Marquess of Northampton, and later also by her granddaughter Anne Parr's family, the Herbert family, Earls of Pembroke, and are visible in Wilton House.

Arms of William Parr, Marquess of Northampton formerly in Cassiobury House

== Ancestry ==
Ancestors of Elizabeth FitzHugh

16. Hugh FitzHugh, 2nd Baron FitzHugh
8. Henry FitzHugh, 3rd Baron FitzHugh
17. Joan Scrope
4. William FitzHugh, 4th Baron FitzHugh
18. Sir Robert Grey
9. Elizabeth Grey
19. Lora St. Quintin
2. Henry FitzHugh, 5th Baron FitzHugh
20. Robert Willoughby, 4th Baron Willoughby de Eresby
10. William Willoughby, 5th Baron Willoughby de Eresby
21. Margery la Zouche
5. Margery Willoughby
22. Roger le Strange, 5th Baron Strange
11. Lucy Lestrange
23. Alaive Fitzalan
1. Elizabeth FitzHugh
24. John Neville, 3rd Baron Neville de Raby
12. Ralph de Neville, 1st Earl of Westmorland
25. Maud Percy
6. Richard Neville, 5th Earl of Salisbury
26. John of Gaunt, 1st Duke of Lancaster
13. Lady Joan Beaufort
27. Katherine Swynford
3. Lady Alice Neville
28. John Montacute, 3rd Earl of Salisbury
14. Thomas Montacute, 4th Earl of Salisbury
29. Maud Francis, Countess of Salisbury
7. Alice Montacute, Countess of Salisbury
30. Thomas Holland, 2nd Earl of Kent
15. Eleanor Holland, Countess of Salisbury
31. Lady Alice Fitzalan
