= William Parr (died 1483) =

Member of the Parliament of England

Sir William Parr
- Garter-encircled arms of Sir William Parr, KG
- Born: 1434
- Died: 1483 (aged 48–49)
- Noble family: Parr
- Spouses: Joanna Trusbut; Elizabeth FitzHugh
- Issue: Anne Parr; Sir Thomas Parr, Lord of Kendal; William Parr, 1st Baron Parr of Horton; John Parr, Esq
- Father: Sir Thomas Parr of Kendal
- Mother: Alice Tunstall

Sir William Parr, KG (1434–1483) was an English courtier and soldier. He was the eldest son of Sir Thomas Parr (1405–1461) and his wife Alice, daughter of Sir Thomas Tunstall of Thurland, Lancashire.

== Family ==
The Parr family originally came from Parr, Lancashire. Sir William's great-grandfather, Sir William de Parre (died 1405) married in 1383 Elizabeth de Ros, daughter of Sir John de Ros of Kendal and Katherine de Latimer, a daughter of Thomas, 1st Baron Latimer of Brayebrooke. Elizabeth was the granddaughter and heiress of Sir Thomas de Ros, Baron of Kendal and had livery of her inheritance. Their marriage alliance with the Ros (or Roos) family enhanced the Parr family standing. On the accession of the Duke of Lancaster as Henry IV of England, Sir William senior stood so high in the estimation of the new monarch that he was deputed with the bishop of St. Asaph to announce the revolution to the court of Spain. Through his marriage William acquired, by right of his wife, a fourth part of the manor of Kirby in Kendal, Kendal Castle, and one-fourth part of the barony of Kendal, which continued in the family till after the death of his grandson, William Parr, 1st Marquess of Northampton, when the Marquess's widow surrendered it to Queen Elizabeth I. It was known as 'The Marquis Fee.' This branch of the family originally resided at Kendal until the Castle fell into disrepair during his son, Thomas's, life.

William Parr's paternal grandparents were Sir John Parr of Kendal (c. 1383 – 1409) and Agnes Crophull, widow of Sir Walter Devereux. From her previous marriage she was mother to a younger Walter Devereux, paternal grandmother to Walter Devereux, Lord Chancellor of Ireland, and great-grandmother to Anne Devereux, Countess of Pembroke. Parr's maternal grandparents were Sir Thomas Tunstall of Thurland Castle and Isabel Harrington, a great-aunt of Sir Thomas Stanley, 1st Earl of Derby. By his maternal grandfather, Parr was a cousin to Bishop Cuthbert Tunstall. After the death of Dame Isabel, Sir Thomas remarried Joan Mowbray, a granddaughter of Margaret, Duchess of Norfolk.

Sir Thomas Parr, the courtier's father, was sub-vice comes (i.e. deputy to the hereditary sheriff, Baron Clifford) for Westmorland from 1428 to 1437 and MP six times. He was assaulted in going to Parliament in 1446, the case being discussed in Parliament. He took an active part in the Wars of the Roses on the Yorkist side and was subsequently attainted in 1459 with the other leading Yorkists. The attainder was reversed in 1461, before his estates had been confiscated.

He died in 1464. Sir Thomas left three sons (including William, the subject of this article) and six daughters. Of his other two sons, his second son, Sir John Parr, also a Yorkist, was rewarded by being made sheriff of Westmorland for life in 1462; he married a daughter of Sir John Yonge, Lord Mayor of the City of London, and must have lived until after 1473, as in that year he was one of those exempted from the resumption act. His third son, Thomas, was killed at the Battle of Barnet in 1471. His daughters all married members of prominent northern families.

== Life ==
William was exempted from the Resumption Act of 1464. He was on the side of the rebellion of Robin of Redesdale, instigated by Richard Neville, earl of Warwick and King Edward IV's younger brother, George Plantagenet, Duke of Clarence. Before all the rebel forces clashed with Edward's royalist forces under William, 1st earl of Pembroke and some 4,000 of his troops (mainly Welsh) at the Battle of Edgcote late July 1469, there had been several minor skirmishes. One result appears to be that the royalist forces became divided between William Herbert, Earl of Pembroke and Humphrey Stafford, Earl of Devon and once the rebel host did arrive, with William Parr, Geoffrey Gates, and John Clapham in command, then Herbert's troops were overwhelmed, turning it into a rout. Both Pembroke and his brother, Sir Richard Herbert of Coldbrook, were captured and executed under Warwick's orders (not ransomed or held as hostages). Within weeks the 'Redesdale' rebels would find and execute King Edward's father-in-law, Lord Rivers and his young son, and soon after, Devon himself. Edward had to disband his own denuded troops as he soon found himself prisoner to his cousin Warwick and spent the summer being toted about the country until he had to be released. The rebellion by Warwick did not end, and Edward went into exile, October 1470, having lost his throne to his cousin—Parr did not go with the now dethroned king and his other supporters.

Parr's companion, Gates, continued on with the rebellion through the fall of 1470, along with other men close to King Edward at his court, such as John Guildford and his son Richard, in something called the forgotten' Kentish rebellion which came on the heels of the one Parr was involved with. Like Parr, both Guildfords, the Auchers, Brune and Robert Neville, would be pardoned by Edward in 1471, once he regained the throne; as for Gates, after 1477 he simply disappeared. This conciliatory manner by Edward to his openly treasonous enemies, men within his own inner circle, was not unusual for the king.

When Edward IV returned from exile in 1471 Parr, along with Sir James Harrington, brought 600 men-at-arms to him at Doncaster. He fought with Edward at Barnet, where his younger brother was killed fighting alongside Richard Plantagenet, Duke of Gloucester, usually described as one of Gloucester's squires. Gloucester remembered Parr's younger brother, and others who fell in battle at his side, in a chantry created at Queens' College, Cambridge, July 1477,

Of some interest is Horrox's comment that Parr may well have died not alongside Richard, but fighting against him and King Edward at Barnet, nonetheless, Parr was added to the list of men who died at Richard's side as if he were loyal to both himself and King Edward. If true, then King Edward's efforts to put past battles behind them in this case was something Gloucester was also willing to extend to the younger Parr. For William, aligning himself with the always reliably stalwart Yorkist, James Harrington, once Edward and Gloucester returned from exile, meant that he was rewarded with the comptrollership of the household, which he held until 1475. He also received a major grant of estates, including the third part of the crown's share of the Kendal barony, and Burgh, Pendragon and Appleby castles. He did not, however, receive the lordship of Kendal itself, and it would be Parr's son who would be the first of the family raised to the peerage, in 1538. Sir William Parr swore, along with everyone else in Edward's family and court, to recognize Edward, Prince of Wales, as heir to the throne in 1472, and was exempted from the Resumption Act of 1473.

Parr sat as knight of the shire for Westmorland in 1467 and 1473, was High Sheriff of Cumberland for 1473 and invested Knight of the Garter in 1474. He was sent to the Kingdom of Scotland to arrange about the breaches of the truce probably in 1479. He was exempted from the act of apparel in 1482, was chief commissioner for exercising the office of constable of England in 1483, and took part in the funeral of Edward IV.

After the death of Edward IV, Parr followed the direction of King's Council, Lord Hastings, and probably his mother-in-law, Lady FitzHugh, and accepted the rule of the Richard, Duke of Gloucester as Lord Protector, during the minority of the new boy-King Edward V. The FitzHughs were closely related to the royal family through Parr's wife, Elizabeth, whose mother was cousin to the Yorks and aunt to Anne, Duchess of Gloucester.

When Richard was offered the throne by the Three Estates to become King, in lieu of the children of the late king (who were now recognized as illegitimate), Parr may have been among some at court who did not agree, but having played both sides of the political fence for years, even taking up arms in open rebellion against the late king, Parr kept whatever reservations he had to himself, much as the Stanleys, the era's premier fence sitters, would do.

The discovery of the plot by William, Lord Hastings on 13 June 1483 was the tipping point for the Protector, and Parr. as it led to Hastings' immediate execution at the Tower. Hastings had been a close friend and adviser to both the duke of Gloucester and the late king. Hastings had also been brother-in-law to Parr's mother-in-law. When Richard became King, William Parr chose not attend the coronation despite being given a position in the coronation as canopy bearer. Lady Parr and her mother, however, were present as two of the seven noble ladies appointed to serve the new Queen consort, Anne.

After refusing to be part of the coronation of King Richard III and his queen consort on 6 July 1483, Lord Parr returned north where he died shortly after. Whatever Parr's misgivings were he was not part of the poorly conceived rebellion that came about in October, 1483, often called Buckingham's rebellion, involving long self-exiled Lancastrians, a few newly embittered household men who felt inadequately remunerated by the new king, and the forgotten exile, Henry of Richmond. If there was any bad blood between Parr and the new king then it stemmed from Edgcote/Banbury, the battle that cost King Edward arguably his most capable, resolute and fearless commander, William Herbert, and at the point where his abilities were just being fully realized. Had Parr, and others, never entertained Warwick's outright treason, Warwick and Clarence would have been 'resolved', there would have been no exile, no destruction of Clarence and very likely no Richard III.

== Wives and children ==
Sir William married, first, Joan Trusbut (died 1473), widow of Thomas Colt of Roydon, Essex; her issue by Parr, if any, did not survive. After Joan's death, William was appointed the wardship of her son John Colt, Esq. His daughter, Jane, would become the first wife of Sir Thomas More.

Secondly, Elizabeth FitzHugh, daughter of Henry, 5th Baron FitzHugh and Lady Alice Neville, who survived him and remarried Sir Nicholas Vaux. By her, Parr had two daughters and three sons:

- Anne Parr (c. 1476 – 4 November 1513), who married Sir Thomas Cheney of Irthlingborough, Northamptonshire.
- Sir Thomas Parr (d. 11 November 1517), Lord of the manor of Kendal and Master of the wards and comptroller to King Henry VIII.
- Sir William Parr, 1st Baron Parr of Horton (d. 10 September 1547)
- Alice Parr (died young)
- John Parr, Esq. (before 1483 – 8 September 1508)

The eldest son, Sir Thomas Parr, was knighted and was sheriff of Northamptonshire in 1509; he was master of the wards and comptroller to Henry VIII. He was rich, owing to his succeeding, in 1512, to half the estates of his cousin, Lord FitzHugh, and also to his marriage with Maud Green, daughter and co-heiress of Sir Thomas Green of Boughton and Greens Norton in Northamptonshire. He died on 11 November 1517, and was buried in St. Ann, Blackfriars, London in an elaborate tomb which has since been destroyed. His widow died on 1 December 1531, and was buried beside him. Of their children, Catherine Parr, queen of Henry VIII, and William Parr (afterwards Marquess of Northampton), are separately noticed; while a daughter, Anne, married William Herbert, Earl of Pembroke.

The second son of Sir William Parr was William, who was knighted on 25 December 1513, was sheriff of Northamptonshire in 1518 and 1522, and after his niece's Catherine Parr's promotion became her chamberlain. On 23 December 1543 he was created Baron Parr of Horton, Northamptonshire. He died on 10 September 1547, and was buried at Horton. By Mary, daughter of Sir William Salisbury, he left four daughters.

A third son of Sir William Parr, named John, married Constance, daughter of Sir Henry Vere of Addington, Surrey. They had no issue.

== Ancestry ==
Ancestors of William Parr (died 1483)

16. Sir John Parr
8. Sir William Parr of Kendal
17. Matilda Leyborne
4. Sir John Parr of Kendal
18. Sir John de Ros of Kendal Castle
9. Elizabeth de Ros
19. Katherine de Latimer
2. Sir Thomas Parr of Kendal
20. Sir John of Bonnington Crophull
10. Sir Thomas de Crophull
21. Lady Margery de Verdun
5. Agnes Crophull
22. Sir John of Kinnersley de la Bere
11. Sybil de la Bere
23. Agnes Turburville
1. Sir William Parr
24. Henry de Tunstall
12. William Tunstall
6. Sir Thomas Tunstall of Thurland Castle
26. Sir Philip Lindsay
13. Alice Lindsay
3. Alice Tunstall
28. Sir John of Farleton Harrington
14. Sir Nicholas of Farleton Harrington
29. Katherine Banastre
7. Isabel Harrington
30. Sir William English
15. Isabel English
31. Margaret le Brun
