= Maud Green =

English courtier (1492–1531)

Maud, Lady Parr
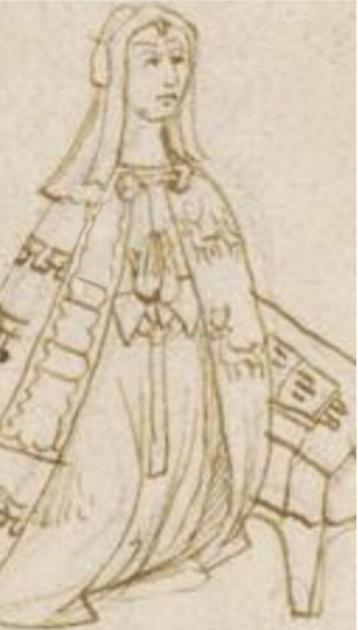
- Close-up of Maud in a sketch of the Parr tomb at St. Anne's, Blackfriars Church.
- Born: 6 April, 1490 or 1492; Northamptonshire, England
- Died: 1 December 1531 (aged 39 or 41)
- Buried: Blackfriars, London, England
- Noble family: Green (by birth); Parr (by marriage)
- Spouse: Sir Thomas Parr
- Issue: Catherine, Queen of England and Ireland; William Parr, 1st Marquess of Northampton; Anne Parr, Countess of Pembroke
- Father: Sir Thomas Green
- Mother: Joan Fogge

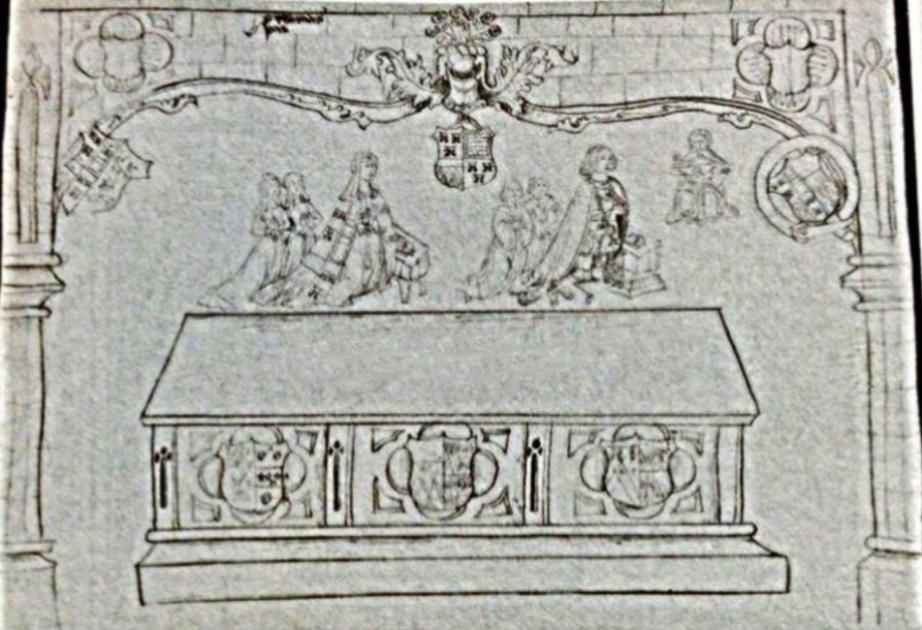
Drawing of the Parr tomb illustrating Maud Green, and her husband Sir Thomas Parr kneeling with their children at St. Anne's, Blackfriars, London which was later destroyed.

Maud Green, Lady Parr (6 April 1490/92 – 1 December 1531) was an English courtier. She was the mother of Catherine Parr, the sixth wife of King Henry VIII of England. She was a close friend and lady-in-waiting to Catherine of Aragon. She was also co-heiress to her father, Sir Thomas Green of Green's Norton in Northamptonshire along with her sister, Anne, Lady Vaux.

== Life ==
Maud was born on 6 April 1490 or, 1492 in Northamptonshire, the daughter of Sir Thomas Green, of Boughton and Green's Norton, and Joan Fogge, daughter of Sir John Fogge.

Her mother died when she was an infant. She became a lady-in-waiting to Catherine of Aragon, the first wife of King Henry VIII sometime after 11 June 1509. She was in constant attendance upon the Queen and was allocated her own rooms at Court on a permanent basis. It is thought that Maud may have named her daughter Catherine after Catherine of Aragon, who was also made godmother to the child.

== Education ==
Maud was a very intelligent and well-educated woman; she was also fluent in French and was lauded as an excellent teacher by her peers.

== Marriage ==
Maud had married Sir Thomas Parr, the eldest son of Sir William Parr and Elizabeth FitzHugh, in 1508. He was the Sheriff of Northamptonshire, master of the wards and comptroller to the King. Maud and Thomas had three surviving children. Although Thomas Parr inherited properties in the north including Kendal Castle in Westmorland, the Parr's resided at Parr House which was located on The Strand in London. By the time Sir Thomas had inherited the castle, it was in need of repair and eventually became derelict. Parr and his wife were courtiers and stayed close to court. Thomas Parr died of the sweating sickness on 11 November 1517, leaving Maud a widow. She chose not to remarry for fear of jeopardizing the huge inheritance she held in trust for her children. She carefully supervised the education of her children and studiously arranged their marriages.

== Issue ==
Before the birth of Catherine, Maud gave birth to a son shortly after her marriage to Sir Thomas. The baby's name is lost to history as he died shortly after birth. After the birth of their third child, Anne, Maud again became pregnant c. 1517, the same year of Thomas' death. However, there is no subsequent mention of the child, so it was probably lost through a miscarriage, stillbirth, or death in early infancy.

Surviving children of Maud Green:

- Catherine Parr (1512 – 5 September 1548) who married four times:

- Sir Edward Burgh, 1529 at Gainsborough, Lincolnshire, England.
- John Neville, 3rd Baron Latimer, summer 1534 in London, Middlesex, England.
- King Henry VIII, 12 July 1543 at Hampton Court Palace in the Queen's Privy closet.
- Thomas Seymour, 1st Baron Seymour of Sudeley, late Spring 1547 and had one daughter: Lady Mary.

- William Parr, 1st Marquess of Northampton, 1st Earl of Essex (1513 – 28 October 1571), married three times, but produced no issue:

- Anne Bourchier, 7th Baroness Bourchier in 1527.
- Elisabeth Brooke
- Helena Snakenborg

- Anne Parr, Countess of Pembroke (15 June 1515 – 20 February 1552), married in 1538, William Herbert, 1st Earl of Pembroke, with whom she had two sons and a daughter: Henry Herbert, 2nd Earl of Pembroke (c. 1539–1601), Sir Edward Herbert (1547–1595), and Lady Anne Herbert (1550–1592).
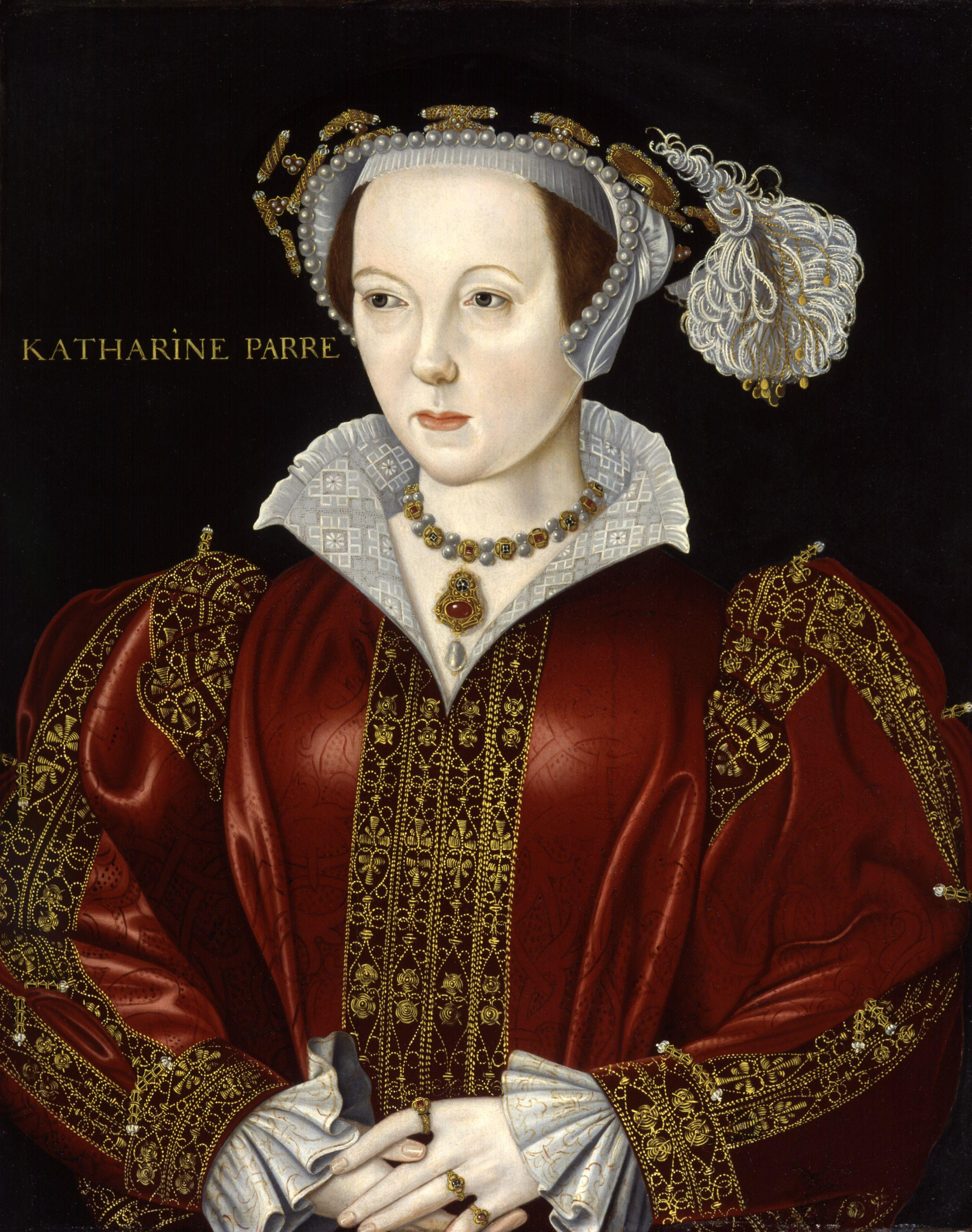
Queen Catherine Parr, sixth wife of Henry VIII

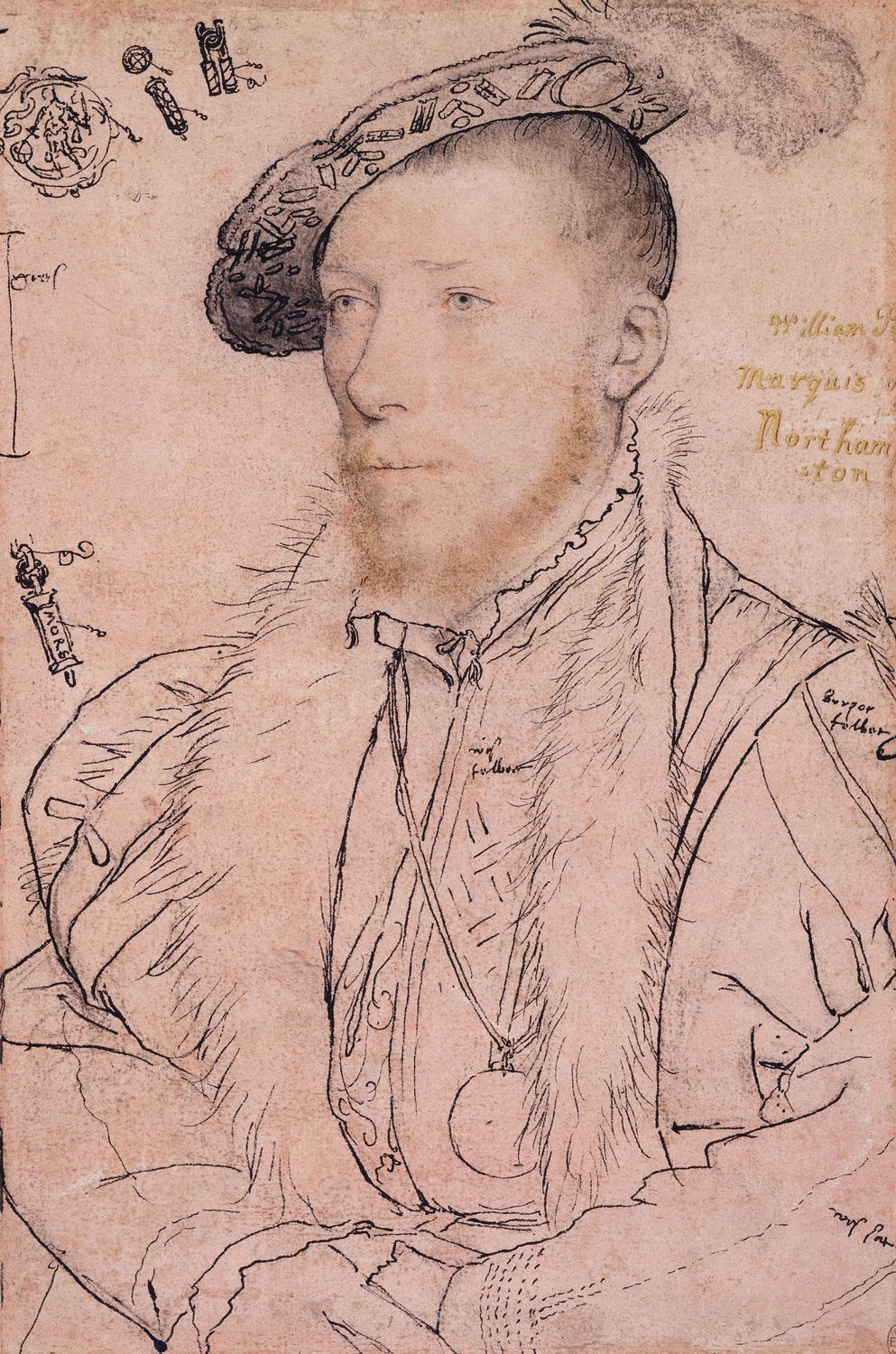
William Parr

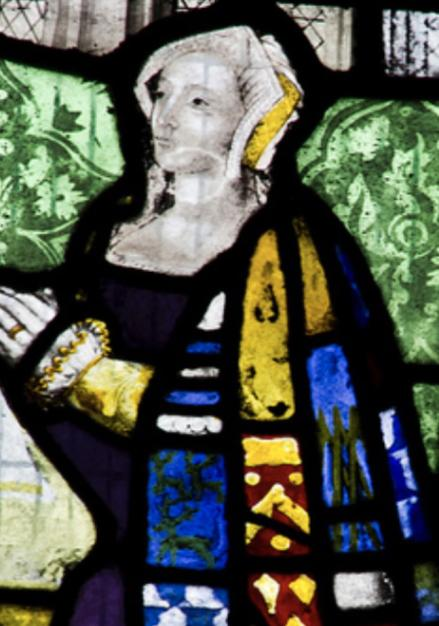
Anne Parr, Countess of Pembroke

== Ancestry ==
Ancestors of Maud Green

16. Sir Thomas Greene
8. Sir Thomas Greene, Sheriff of Northampton
17. Mary Talbot
4. Sir Thomas Greene
18. Robert de Ferrers, 5th Baron Ferrers of Chartley
9. Philippa de Ferrers
19. Margaret le Despenser
2. Sir Thomas Green
20. Thomas Throckmorton
10. Sir John Throckmorton
21. Agnes Besford
5. Maud Throckmorton
22. Sir Guy de Spinney of Coughton
11. Eleanor de la Spine
1. Maud Green
6. Sir John Fogge
3. Joan Fogge

== Death ==
Maud died on 1 December 1531 and is buried in St. Ann's Church, Blackfriars Church, London, England beside her husband. In her will, she left her daughter Catherine a jeweled cipher pendant in the shape of an 'M', described as "an eme of diamontes with three pearls therat" and other pieces including a tablet or locket with pictures of the King and Queen.

== Notes ==
- Mike Ashley, British Kings and Queens (New York; Carroll and Graf Publishing, 1998).
- Anthony Martienssen, Queen Katherine Parr (McGraw-Hill Book Company, 1973), pp. 7, 17, 18, 29–39.
