= Anne Herbert, Countess of Pembroke =

English noblewoman and courtier

The Countess of Pembroke
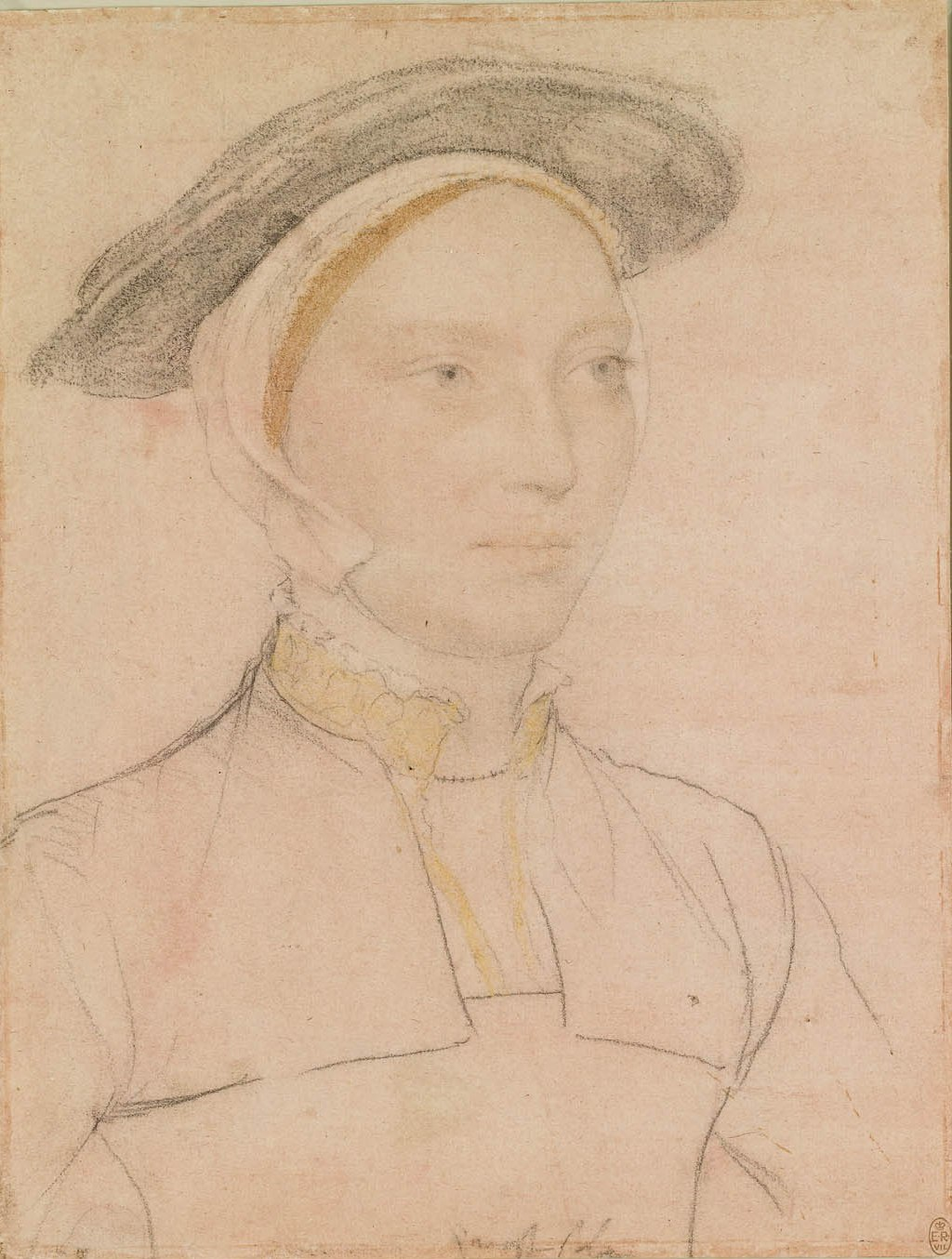
- Sketch of an unknown woman, presumed to be of Anne Parr by Hans Holbein the Younger
- Born: 15 June 1515; London, England
- Died: 20 February 1552 (aged 36); Baynard's Castle, London, England
- Buried: St Paul's Cathedral, City of London
- Spouse: William Herbert, 1st Earl of Pembroke
- Issue: Henry Herbert, 2nd Earl of Pembroke; Sir Edward Herbert; Lady Anne Herbert
- Father: Sir Thomas Parr
- Mother: Maud Green

Anne Herbert, Countess of Pembroke, Baroness Herbert of Cardiff (née Parr; 15 June 1515 – 20 February 1552) was lady-in-waiting to each of Henry VIII's six wives. She was the younger sister of his sixth wife, Catherine Parr.

== Early years ==
Anne was born on 15 June 1515 to Sir Thomas Parr and Maud Green. She was the youngest surviving child of five, having an older sister Katherine and brother William Parr, 1st Marquess of Northampton. In 1517, when she was two years old, her father died of the sweating sickness leaving her mother a widow at twenty-five, pregnant, and with the grave responsibility of guarding the inheritance of the Parr children. Maud Green was a lady-in-waiting and confidant to Katherine of Aragon. She was also head of the Royal school at court where Anne was educated alongside her sister Catherine and other daughters of the nobility. They were taught by the brilliant Humanist scholar Joan Lluís Vives who was the principal tutor at the Royal school. Anne would have been taught French, Latin, philosophy, theology, and the Classics. Maud Green had already taught her children to read and write when they were small. Anne herself later said that her education at home was based on the approach used in the family of Sir Thomas More where boys and girls were educated together; as was the case with the Parrs until her brother left home in 1525 to join the household of Henry FitzRoy, 1st Duke of Richmond and Somerset.

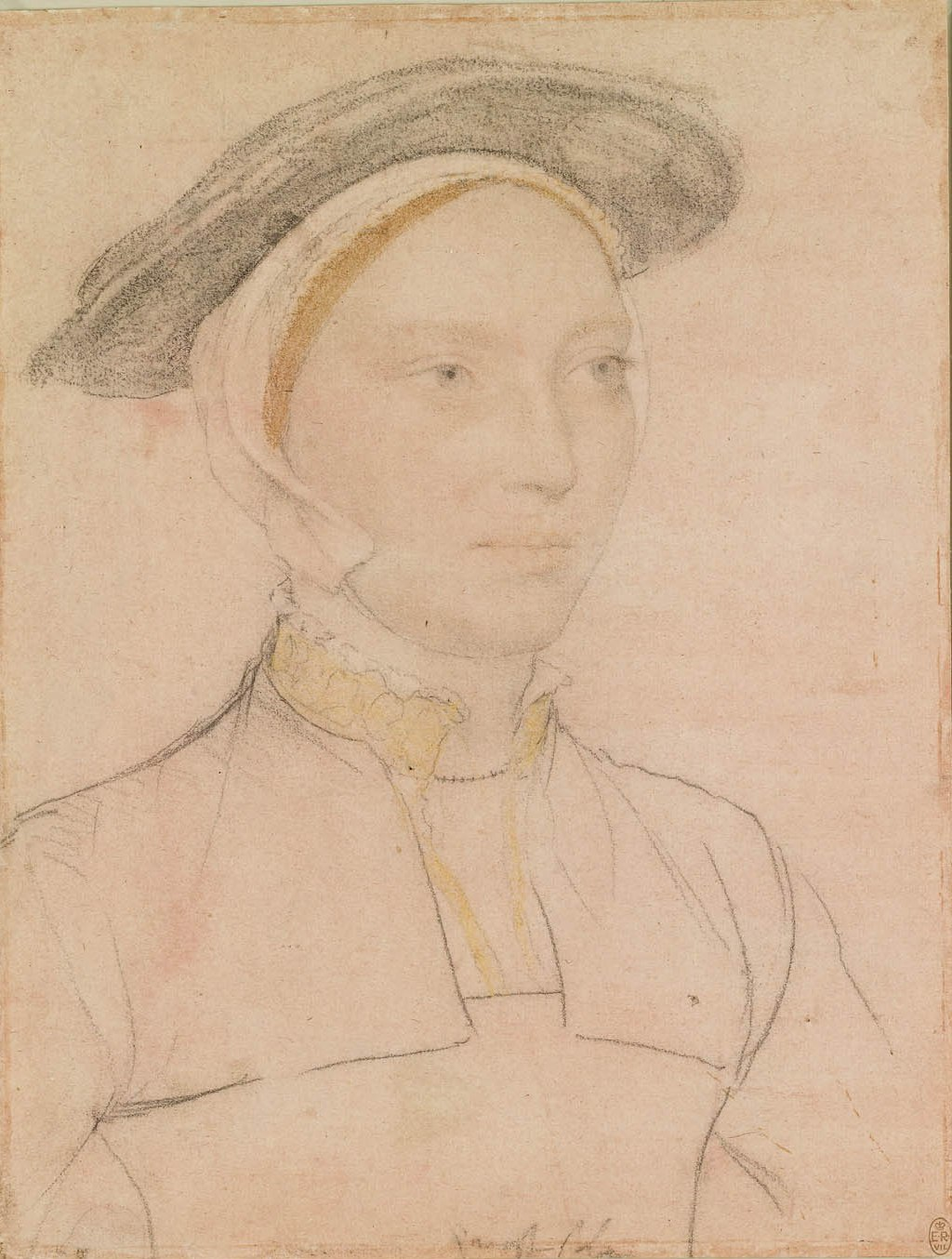
A portrait thought to be of Anne Parr drawn by Hans Holbein the Younger

== At court ==
Sometime in 1528, Maud Green secured her 13-year-old daughter, Anne, a post at Court as maid-of-honour to Queen Katherine of Aragon. Anne was then made a ward of King Henry VIII. When Anne Boleyn was crowned queen in 1533, Anne Parr continued in the same capacity as maid-of-honour. She quickly succumbed to the spell of Queen Anne's charismatic personality and following the Queen's example, she became an ardent supporter of the New Faith. After Anne Boleyn's fall from power and subsequent execution, Anne remained at Court in the service of the new queen, Jane Seymour. Anne Parr served all of Henry VIII's queens from the mid-1530s, and is one of the few women to have been lady-in-waiting to all six. She was one of the few present at the baptism of Prince Edward on 15 October 1537 and was part of the funeral cortege of Jane Seymour.

When King Henry took as his fourth wife Anne of Cleves, Anne returned to her role as maid-of-honour, which she remained in when Queen Anne was supplanted by Katherine Howard. Following Queen Katherine's arrest for adultery, Anne Parr was entrusted with the Queen's jewels.

== Marriage ==
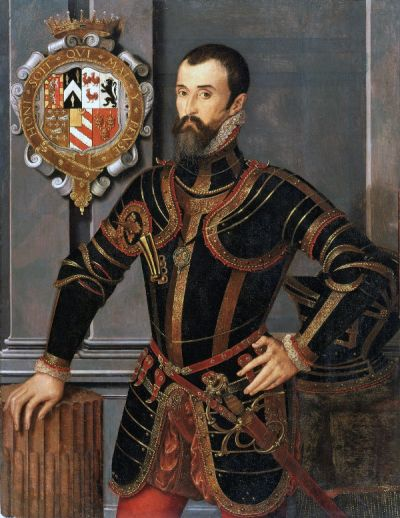
William Herbert, 1st Earl of Pembroke, Anne's husband

In February 1538, Anne married Sir William Herbert, Esquire of the King's Body. Herbert was the son of Sir Richard Herbert, the illegitimate son of William Herbert, 1st Earl of Pembroke. It is likely that Anne met her husband at court. It is not known whether or not the marriage was a love match, but both Anne and her sister Katherine had been attracted to dashing men of action who were slightly disreputable. The Herberts, due to King Henry's newly found infatuation for Katherine, appeared to be in the King's favour, as for the next few years Anne and her husband received a succession of Royal grants which included the Abbey of Wilton in Wiltshire (pulled down and built over for Wilton House in the 1540s), Remesbury (north Wiltshire), and Cardiff Castle. They also used Baynard's Castle as their London residence. Anne had three children by her husband: Henry, who succeeded his father; Edward Herbert; and Anne Herbert. For the birth of her second son, Anne's sister loaned her the manor of Hanworth in Middlesex for her lying in. After the birth, Anne visited Lady Hertford, who had also just given birth, at Syon House near Richmond. In August, the queen sent a barge to bring Anne by river from Syon back to Westminster.

== Queen's sister ==
Anne Parr was a witness to the wedding ceremony performed at Hampton Court Palace on 12 July 1543, when King Henry married her sister Katherine. In September 1544, William Herbert was knighted on the battlefield at the Siege of Boulogne during the King's campaign against the French. Anne was her sister's chief lady-in-waiting and the sisters were close. Anne was also part of the clique of Protestants who surrounded the new Queen. In 1546, fellow Protestant Anne Askew was arrested for heresy. Those who opposed the Queen tried to gain a confession from Askew that the Queen, her sister, and the other women were Protestants. Queen Katherine and some of her closest friends had previously shown favour to the arrested woman. Stephen Gardiner, Bishop of Winchester; Thomas Wriothesley; and Richard Rich were involved in torturing Anne Askew and interrogating her about her connections to the ladies at court who were suspected to be Protestants, in particular: Anne Parr; the Queen; Katherine Willoughby; Anne Stanhope; and Anne Calthorpe, Countess of Sussex. Gardiner and Wriothesley obtained the King's permission to arrest and question the Queen about her religious beliefs.

Katherine visited the King in his bedchamber and adroitly managed to persuade the King that her interest in the new religion had been undertaken solely as a means to provide stimulating conversation to distract the King from the pain caused by his ulcerous leg. Henry was appeased, and before the arrests were due to take place, he was reconciled to Katherine. On 28 January 1547, the King died. After Henry VIII's death, when the Queen Dowager's household was at Chelsea, both Anne and her son Edward were part of the household there. Her husband, William Herbert was appointed as one of the guardians to the new king, Edward VI. Katherine shortly afterward married Thomas Seymour, Lord Sudeley, Lord High Admiral of England, who was an uncle of King Edward. In September 1548, following the birth of a daughter, Mary Seymour, Katherine Parr died of puerperal fever.

== Later life ==
On 10 October 1551, Anne's husband was raised to the peerage as Baron Herbert of Cardiff and on 11 October 1551 was created Earl of Pembroke. In 1553 he received the disgraced Duke of Somerset's Wiltshire estates, including Ramsbury and a newly built mansion at Bedwin Broil, as well as extensive woodland on the borders of the New Forest. The Herberts had been friends of Somerset until he fell from favour. Herbert was also granted, on the attainder of Sir Thomas Arundell, Wardour Castle and park; he also obtained some property which had belonged to the diocese of Winchester. The Wardour property subsequently reverted to the Arundell family by exchange and purchase, but Pembroke's increase of wealth exceeded that of any of his colleagues.

Anne died on 20 February 1552. At the time of her death, she was one of the ladies of the Lady Mary, the future Queen Mary I. William married as his second wife, Anne Talbot; however, the marriage produced no children. Through her sons, Anne has many descendants, including the present-day Earls of Pembroke, Montgomery, and Carnarvon.

Anne was buried on 28 February 1552 in the Old St Paul's Cathedral in the City of London, next to her ancestor John of Gaunt, Duke of Lancaster. Her husband died on 17 March 1570; by his wish, she was also buried in St Paul's. Anne's memorial there described her in Latin as "a most faithful wife, a woman of the greatest piety and discretion".

== Issue ==
Anne Parr and William Herbert had three children:

- Henry Herbert, 2nd Earl of Pembroke (c. 1539–1601). On 21 May 1553, married Catherine Grey. The marriage was annulled in 1554. His second wife was Catherine Talbot, daughter of George Talbot, 6th Earl of Shrewsbury. His third wife was Mary Sidney by whom he had children, including William and Philip, both of whom would accede to the Earldom of Pembroke.
- Sir Edward Herbert (1547–1595), married Mary Stanley, by whom he had issue including William Herbert, 1st Baron Powis.
- Lady Anne Herbert (1550–1592), married Francis, Lord Talbot, son of George Talbot, 6th Earl of Shrewsbury. There is no known issue from this marriage.

== Jewels ==
An inventory made in 1561 included the Countess's remaining possessions, and is now held by the National Art Library at the Victoria and Albert Museum. The Countess of Pembroke had owned a gold mounted zibellino described as a "sabelles heade" set with 21 diamonds and a ruby in its mouth, with four gold claws. Other jewels included a gold girdle set with pearls and counterfeited rubies and sapphires, a locket or "tablet" with a portrait of Philip II of Spain and his father Charles V, Holy Roman Emperor, another tablet with the initial "P", and two "books of gold". A "unicorn bone sett in golde" with a turquoise, two rubies, and two diamonds, was a charm against poisoning.

== Depictions in television and film ==
- Anne Parr (Lady Herbert) was depicted by Irish actress, Suzy Lawlor in the fourth and final season of The Tudors. In the programme she is a lady-in-waiting to Queen Katherine Howard (Tamzin Merchant) and chief maid-of-honor to her sister, Queen Katherine Parr (Joely Richardson).
