= Felton (surname) =

Felton is a surname. Notable people with the surname include:

- Alfred Felton (1831–1904), Australian philanthropist
- Alf Felton (1889–1951), Australian rower
- Billy Felton (1900–1977), English footballer
- Camille Felton (born 1999), Canadian actress
- Carlos Felton (born 1958), Mexican politician
- Charles N. Felton (1832–1914), American politician
- Cornelius Conway Felton (1807–1862), American university president
- Daniel Felton (born 1955), American bishop
- Da'Quan Felton (born 2001), American football player
- Dave Felton (born 1967), American guitarist
- Demetric Felton (born 1998), American football player
- Dennis Felton (born 1963), American basketball coach
- Dorothy Felton (1929–2008), American politician
- Earl Felton (1909–1972), American screenwriter
- Eric Felton (born 1955), American football player
- Felix Felton (1911–1972), British actor
- Gene Felton (1936–2020), American race car driver
- George Felton (born 1952), American basketball coach
- George E. Felton (1921–2019), British computer scientist
- Happy Felton (1907–1964), American entertainer
- Harold Felton (1902–1991), American writer and folklorist
- Henry Felton, 2nd Baronet (1619–1690), English politician
- Henry Felton (clergyman) (1679–1740), English clergyman and academic
- Jalek Felton (born 1998), American basketball player
- James Felton (died 2006), American basketball player
- Jerome Felton (born 1986), American football player
- John Felton (divine) (died 15th century), English academic and churchman
- John Felton (assassin) (c. 1595–1628), English assassin of George Villiers, 1st Duke of Buckingham
- John Felton (martyr) (died 1570), English Catholic martyr
- John Felton (American football) (1883–1961), American football coach
- John B. Felton (1827–1877), mayor of Oakland, California
- John Felton (canoeist) (born 1960), Australian canoeist
- Jule W. Felton (1898–1978), American lawyer and justice of the Supreme Court of Georgia
- Katharine Felton (1873–1940), American social service innovator
- Ken Felton (1949–2020), English footballer
- Kim Felton (born 1975), Australian golfer
- Lavelle Felton (1979–2009), American basketball player
- Leo Felton (born 1970), American white supremacist
- Leon Felton (born 1979), Rhodesian/Australian rugby league footballer
- Lindsay Felton (born 1984), American actress
- Marie-Claude Felton (born 1981), French-Canadian writer, teacher, and historian
- Mark Felton (born 1974), British historian
- Martin Felton, New Zealand association football player
- Nathaniel Felton (1615–1705), Massachusetts landowner
- Nicholas Felton (graphic designer), American graphic designer
- Nicholas Felton (bishop) (1556–1626), English academic and bishop
- Norman Felton (1913–2012), American television producer
- Ralph Felton (1932–2011), American football player
- Raymond Felton (born 1984), American basketball player
- Rebecca Latimer Felton (1835–1930), American teacher, writer and U.S. Senator for one day
- Richard Felton, British Army officer
- Robert Felton (priest) (died 1438), English priest
- Robert Felton (cricketer) (1909–1982), English cricketer
- Robert Felton (American football) (born 1984), American football player
- Roy Felton (1918–1982), English footballer
- Samuel Morse Felton, Sr. (1809–1889), American railroad executive
- Samuel Morse Felton, Jr. (1853–1930), American railroad executive
- Samuel Felton (athlete) (1926–2015), American athlete
- Sam Felton, American football and baseball player
- Steve Felton (born 1969), American musician
- Tai Felton (born 2003), American football player
- Teddy Felton (1907–1970), English footballer
- Terry Felton (born 1957), American baseball player
- Thomas Felton (KG) (died 1381), English landowner and knight
- Thomas Felton (martyr) (1567–1588), English Catholic martyr and son of John Felton
- Thomas Felton, 4th Baronet (1649–1709), English politician
- Tom Felton (born 1987), English actor
- Verna Felton (1890–1966), American actress
- Vivien Felton (1929–2005), English footballer
- Walter S. Felton Jr. (1944–2022), American judge
- Wes Felton, American musician
- William Felton (died 1367), English knight
- William Felton (composer) (1715–1769), British composer
- William Bowman Felton (1782–1837), British naval officer and Canadian politician
- William Felton (coachmaker), London coachmaker
- William Locker Pickmore Felton (1812–1877), Canadian lawyer and political figure
- William Harrell Felton (1823–1909), American politician

Fictional characters:

- Beau Felton, fictional character from Homicide: Life on the Street
