= John Felton =

John Felton may refer to:

- John Felton (assassin) (c. 1595–1628), assassin of George Villiers, 1st Duke of Buckingham
- John Felton (martyr) (died 1570), English Catholic martyr
- John Felton (divine) (fl. 1430), English academic and churchman
- John Felton (canoeist) (born 1960), Australian slalom canoeist
- John Felton (died 1396) (c. 1339–1396), in 1390, Member of Parliament for Northumberland
- John Felton (c. 1537–c. 1602), Member of Parliament for Great Yarmouth
- John Felton (American football) (1883–1961), American football coach
- John B. Felton (1827–1877), American jurist and politician
