= List of Wigan Athletic F.C. seasons =

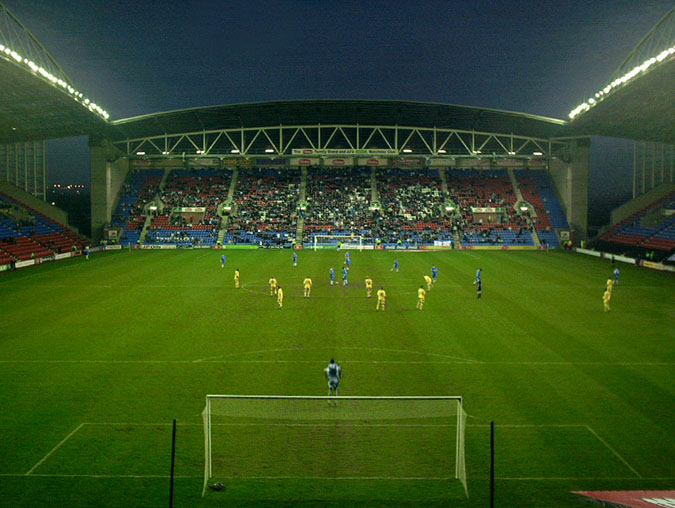
The Brick Community Stadium (formerly the DW Stadium and JJB Stadium) has been the home of Wigan Athletic since the 1999–2000 season.

Wigan Athletic Football Club was founded in 1932 and joined the Football League in 1978. The team played in the Premier League for the first time in 2005–06. The table details the club's achievements in all first team competitions, and records their top goalscorer, for each completed season.

== Seasons ==
Season	League									FA Cup	League Cup	Other competitions		Top goalscorer(s)	
Season	Division	Pld	W	D	L	GF	GA	Pts	Pos	FA Cup	League Cup	Other competitions		Player(s)	Goals
1932–33	CHES	42	21	11	10	121	54	53	5th					William Chambers	48
1933–34	CHES	42	30	6	6	111	46	66	1st					Teddy Felton	36
1934–35	CHES	42	27	9	6	153	59	63	1st	R3				Jack Roberts	66
1935–36	CHES	42	31	6	5	136	46	68	1st	R1				Robson	36
1936–37	CHES	42	19	6	17	94	73	44	8th	R1				John Wallbanks	44
1937–38	CHES	42	19	4	19	95	89	42	11th	R1				Horace Thomas	35
1938–39	CHES	42	21	5	16	104	84	47	7th	3Q				Horace Thomas	48
1945–46	CHES	38	12	6	20	88	117	30	17th	2Q				Barker	16
1946–47	CHES	42	9	7	26	66	114	25	22nd	2Q				Roberts	13
1947–48	LAN C-1	42	25	9	8	72	37	59	1st	4Q				Taylor	19
1948–49	LAN C-1	42	19	9	14	73	68	47	6th	1Q				Cunliffe	27
1949–50	LAN C-1	42	24	8	10	79	47	56	2nd	3Q				Billy Lomax	42
1950–51	LAN C-1	42	27	7	8	98	43	61	1st	4Q				Billy Lomax	55
1951–52	LAN C-1	42	21	9	12	73	57	51	4th	4Q				Jackie Lyon	21
1952–53	LAN C-1	42	27	13	2	124	45	67	1st	4Q				Jackie Lyon	33
1953–54	LAN C-1	40	31	4	5	110	48	66	1st	R3				Jack Livesey	37
1954–55	LAN C-1	42	21	10	11	93	56	52	3rd	R1				Vincent	35
1955–56	LAN C-1	38	18	10	10	80	56	46	6th	4Q				Roy Smith	31
1956–57	LAN C-1	38	17	3	18	73	61	37	10th	R1				Roy Smith	25
1957–58	LAN C-1	42	21	11	10	95	60	53	4th	R2				Roy Smith	30
1958–59	LAN C-1	42	12	7	23	60	84	31	18th	4Q				Jimmy Prescott	15
1959–60	LAN C-1	42	27	6	9	101	51	60	2nd	4Q				Peter Higham	36
1960–61	LAN C-1	42	25	8	9	108	56	58	3rd	4Q				Wally Hazelden	34
1961–62	CHES	42	24	7	11	86	51	55	5th	4Q				Peter Higham	33
1962–63	CHES	42	22	6	14	70	54	50	7th	R1				Harry Lyon	38
1963–64	CHES	42	18	7	17	94	82	43	12th	4Q				Harry Lyon	35
1964–65	CHES	42	32	3	7	121	46	67	1st	R1				Harry Lyon	66
1965–66	CHES	42	32	8	2	133	40	72	2nd	R2				Harry Lyon	61
1966–67	CHES	42	26	8	8	101	61	60	2nd	R1				Bert Llewellyn	37
1967–68	CHES	42	18	12	12	62	48	48	8th	4Q				Bert Llewellyn	25
1968–69	NPL	38	18	12	8	59	41	48	2nd	4Q				Tony McLoughlin	19
1969–70	NPL	38	20	12	6	56	32	52	2nd	R1		FA Trophy	R2	Tony McLoughlin	34
1970–71	NPL	42	27	13	2	91	32	67	1st	R3		FA Trophy	R3	Geoff Davies	41
1971–72	NPL	46	27	10	9	70	43	64	3rd	R2		FA Trophy	R3	Geoff Davies	28
1972–73	NPL	46	23	14	9	69	38	60	3rd	R1		FA Trophy	RU	Graham Oates	26
1973–74	NPL	46	28	8	10	96	39	64	2nd	R1		FA Trophy	R1	John Rogers	22
1974–75	NPL	46	33	6	7	94	38	72	1st	R2		FA Trophy	QF	John Rogers	30
1975–76	NPL	46	21	15	10	81	42	57	6th	R2		FA Trophy	R3	John Rogers	32
1976–77	NPL	44	14	15	15	62	54	43	14th	R1		FA Trophy	R2	John Wilkie	17
1977–78	NPL ↑	46	25	15	6	83	45	65	2nd (Note: Won election to the Football League Fourth Division.)	R3		FA Trophy	R3	John Wilkie	26
1978–79	Div 4	46	21	13	12	63	48	55	6th	R1	R2			Peter Houghton	14
1979–80	Div 4	46	21	13	12	76	61	55	6th	R4	R1			Peter Houghton	16
1980–81	Div 4	46	18	11	17	51	55	47	11th	R1	R2			Micky Quinn	14
1981–82	Div 4 ↑	46	26	13	7	80	46	91	3rd	R1	R4			Les Bradd	20
1982–83	Div 3	46	15	9	22	60	72	54	18th	R1	R2			Eamon O'Keefe	17
1983–84	Div 3	46	16	13	17	46	56	61	15th	R3	R1	FL Trophy	R1	Steve Taylor	10
1984–85	Div 3	46	15	14	17	60	64	59	16th	R3	R2	FL Trophy	W	Steve Johnson Mike Newell	16
1985–86	Div 3	46	23	14	9	82	48	83	4th	R4	R1	FL Trophy	AF	Warren Aspinall	27
1986–87	Div 3	46	25	10	11	83	60	85	4th	QF	R1	FL Trophy	R1	Bobby Campbell	20
1987–88	Div 3	46	20	12	14	70	61	72	7th	R2	R2	FL Trophy	Grp	Bobby Campbell	16
1988–89	Div 3	46	14	14	18	55	53	56	17th	R1	R1	FL Trophy	AQF	Bryan Griffiths	9
1989–90	Div 3	46	13	14	19	48	64	53	18th	R3	R2	FL Trophy	AQF	Bryan Griffiths Mark Hilditch	9
1990–91	Div 3	46	20	9	17	71	54	69	10th	R3	R1	FL Trophy	ASF	Bryan Griffiths Don Page	17
1991–92	Div 3	46	15	14	17	58	64	59	15th	R3	R2	FL Trophy	Grp	Gary Worthington	18
1992–93	Div 2 ↓	46	10	11	25	43	72	41	23rd	R2	R2	FL Trophy	AF	Bryan Griffiths	17
1993–94	Div 3	42	11	12	19	51	70	45	19th	R3	R1	FL Trophy	Grp	Andy Lyons	11
1994–95	Div 3	42	14	10	18	53	60	52	14th	R2	R2	FL Trophy	AQF	Andy Lyons	15
1995–96	Div 3	46	20	10	16	62	56	70	10th	R3	R1	FL Trophy	R2	Roberto Martínez	13
1996–97	Div 3 ↑	46	26	9	11	84	51	87	1st	R1	R1	FL Trophy	R2	Graeme Jones	31
1997–98	Div 2	46	17	11	18	64	66	62	11th	R3	R1	FL Trophy	AQF	David Lowe	16
1998–99	Div 2	46	22	10	14	75	48	76	6th	R2	R2	FL Trophy	W	Stuart Barlow	19
1999–2000	Div 2	46	22	17	7	72	38	83	4th	R3	R2	FL Trophy	R2	Stuart Barlow	18
2000–01	Div 2	46	19	18	9	53	42	75	6th	R2	R2	FL Trophy	R2	Simon Haworth	11
2001–02	Div 2	46	16	16	14	66	51	64	10th	R1	R1	FL Trophy	R1	Andy Liddell	18
2002–03	Div 2 ↑	46	29	13	4	68	25	100	1st	R3	QF	FL Trophy	R2	Andy Liddell	16
2003–04	Div 1	46	18	17	11	60	45	71	7th	R3	R3			Nathan Ellington	18
2004–05	Champ (Note: In 2004–05 the Football League First Division had been renamed the Football League Championship as part of a re-branding exercise by the Football League.) ↑	46	25	12	9	79	35	87	2nd	R3	R1			Nathan Ellington	24
2005–06	Prem	38	15	6	17	45	52	51	10th	R4	RU			Henri Camara	12
2006–07	Prem	38	10	8	20	37	59	38	17th	R3	R2			Emile Heskey	8
2007–08	Prem	38	10	10	18	34	51	40	14th	R4	R2			Marcus Bent	7
2008–09	Prem	38	12	9	17	34	45	45	11th	R3	R4			Amr Zaki	10
2009–10	Prem	38	9	9	20	37	79	36	16th	R4	R2			Hugo Rodallega	10
2010–11	Prem	38	9	15	14	40	61	42	16th	R4	QF			Charles N'Zogbia Hugo Rodallega	9
2011–12	Prem	38	11	10	17	42	62	43	15th	R3	R2			Franco Di Santo	9
2012–13	Prem ↓	38	9	9	20	47	73	36	18th	W	R4			Arouna Koné	11
2013–14	Champ	46	21	10	15	61	48	73	5th	SF	R3	Europa League	GS	Jordi Gómez Nick Powell	7
2014–15	Champ ↓	46	9	12	25	39	64	39	23rd	R3	R1			James McClean	6
2015–16	Lge 1 ↑	46	24	15	7	82	45	87	1st	R1	R1	FL Trophy	ASF	Will Grigg	28
2016–17	Champ ↓	46	10	12	24	40	57	42	23rd	R4	R1			Will Grigg	7
2017–18	Lge 1 ↑	46	29	11	6	89	29	98	1st	QF	R2	EFL Trophy	GS	Will Grigg	26
2018–19	Champ	46	13	13	20	51	64	52	18th	R3	R1			Joe Garner Nick Powell	8
2019–20	Champ ↓	46	15	14	17	57	56	47 (Note: Deducted 12 points for entering administration.)	23rd	R3	R1			Kieffer Moore	10
2020–21	Lge 1	46	13	9	24	54	77	48	20th	R1	R1	EFL Trophy	GS	Will Keane	12
2021–22	Lge 1 ↑	46	27	11	8	82	44	92	1st	R4	R3	EFL Trophy	SF	Will Keane	27
2022–23	Champ ↓	46	10	15	21	38	65	42 (Note: Deducted 3 points for failing to pay players and staff on time.)	24th	R3	R1			Will Keane	12
2023–24	Lge 1	46	20	10	16	63	56	62 (Note: Deducted 8 points following EFL rule breaches relating to late wage payments in 2022-23 season.)	12th	R3	R1	EFL Trophy	R16	Stephen Humphrys	14
2024–25	Lge 1	46	13	17	16	40	42	56	15th	R4	R1	EFL Trophy	R32	Thelo Aasgaard	13

== Key ==
Key to league record:

- Pld = Matches played
- W = Matches won
- D = Matches drawn
- L = Matches lost
- GF = Goals for
- GA = Goals against
- Pts = Points
- Pos = Final position

Key to divisions:

- CHES = Cheshire County League
- LAN C-1 = Lancashire Combination
- NPL = Northern Premier League
- Div 1 = Football League First Division
- Div 2 = Football League Second Division
- Div 3 = Football League Third Division
- Div 4 = Football League Fourth Division
- Prem = Premier League
- Champ = Championship

Key to rounds:

- DNE = Did not enter
- Grp = Group stage
- 2Q = Second qualifying round
- 3Q = Third qualifying round
- 4Q = Fourth qualifying round
- R1 = Round 1
- R2 = Round 2
- R3 = Round 3
- R4 = Round 4
- R5 = Round 5
- QF = Quarter-finals
- SF = Semi-finals
- ASF = Area semi-finals
- AF = Area final
- RU = Runners-up
- WS = Shared
- W = Winners

Champions	Runners-up	Promoted	Relegated

Divisions in bold indicate a change in division.
Players in bold indicate the top scorer in the division that season.
