= John Felton (martyr) =

English Roman Catholic martyr

Blessed John Felton

Martyr
- Born: Bermondsey Abbey, near Southwark
- Died: 8 August 1570; St. Paul's Churchyard, London
- Honored in: Roman Catholicism
- Beatified: 29 December 1886 by Pope Leo XIII
- Feast: 8 August
- Attributes: Martyr's palm, scroll with the Emblem of the Papacy

John Felton (fl. before 1566 - died 8 August 1570) was an English Catholic martyr, executed during the reign of Elizabeth I. Felton was arrested for fixing a copy of Pope Pius V's bull Regnans in Excelsis excommunicating Queen Elizabeth, to the gates of the Bishop of London's palace near St. Paul's.

== Life ==
Almost all of what is known about Felton's background comes from the narrative of his daughter, Frances Salisbury. The manuscript that holds her story has a blank where his age should be, but it does say that he was a wealthy man of Norfolk ancestry, who lived at Bermondsey Abbey near Southwark. Bermondsey was a mansion built the generation before on the site of and out of the materials of a great Cluniac monastery. He "was a man of stature little and of complexion black". His wife had been a playmate of Elizabeth I, a maid-of-honour to Queen Mary and the widow of one of Mary's auditors (a legal official of the papal court). John Felton was a well-known Catholic, and the father of Thomas Felton (born 1566).

Felton was arrested for fixing a copy of Pope Pius V's bull Regnans in Excelsis ("reigning on high"), excommunicating Queen Elizabeth, to the gates of the Bishop of London's palace near St. Paul's. Elizabeth and her ministers were by no means indifferent to the potential political effects of the papal bull. In the Europe of the sixteenth century there were still Catholic powers who might be ready to execute the sentence of deposition that was in those days the corollary of excommunication.

Posting the copy of the bull was a significant act of treason as the document, which released Elizabeth's subjects from their allegiance, needed to be promulgated in England before it could take legal effect. The deed brought about the end of the previous policy of tolerance towards those Catholics who were content occasionally to attend their parish church while keeping their true beliefs to themselves. The reaction seemed soon to be justified: it was the publication in England of Pius's exhortation that gave the impetus to the Ridolfi plot, in which the Duke of Norfolk was to kidnap or murder Queen Elizabeth, install Mary, Queen of Scots, on the throne and then become de facto king by marrying her.

The law records say that the act was committed around eleven at night on 24 May 1570, but Salisbury claims it happened between two and three in the morning of the following day, the Feast of Corpus Christi. Felton had received the bulls in Calais and given one to a friend, William Mellowes of Lincoln's Inn. A general search of known Catholic houses in and near London was undertaken and the copy was soon discovered. After being racked, Mellowes implicated Felton, who was arrested on 26 May. Felton immediately confessed and glorified in his deed, "treasonably declar[ing] that the queen … ought not to be the queen of England", but he was still racked as the authorities were seeking, through his testimony, to implicate Guerau de Spes, the Ambassador of Spain, in the action. Felton was condemned on 4 August and executed by hanging four days later in St. Paul's Churchyard, London. He was cut down alive for quartering, and his daughter says that he uttered the holy name of Jesus once or twice when the hangman had his heart in his hand. He was beatified in 1886 by Pope Leo XIII.

Records of the trial from Elizabeth's state papers, and the deliberations of the Privy Council regarding the effect on relations with Spain, are retained in the Public Record Office.
