= Charles Baillie (papal agent) =

Charles Baillie, or Bailly (1542–1625), was a Fleming by birth, but a Scot by descent. He was a papal agent and member of the household of Mary, Queen of Scots, following the murder of her husband. Having the mastery of several European languages he was, after Mary's imprisonment in England, employed in carrying out foreign plots on her behalf. Baillie was captured and imprisoned in the Tower of London and carved two inscriptions on the walls.

== Arrest and imprisonment ==
Baillie joined the service of Mary, Queen of Scots in 1564, and became a clerk or secretary to John Lesley, Bishop of Ross, who acted as Mary's diplomat or agent when she was a prisoner in England. An Italian banker in London and agent of Pope Pius V, Roberto di Ridolfi, was arrested in London in December 1569, and his papers were examined and showed networks of finance and credit involving the Pope, John Lesley and others. Ridolfi was released, but English officials were now vigilant and suspicious of his contacts.

In the spring of 1571, as Baillie was leaving Flanders with copies of a book by John Lesley in defence of Queen Mary, newly printed at the Liège press, Ridolfi entrusted him with letters in cipher for Lesley and Mary, and also for the Spanish ambassador Guerau de Espés, the Duke of Norfolk, and Lord Lumley. The letters outlined a plan for a Spanish landing on Mary's behalf in the eastern counties of England, sometimes known as the "enterprise". As soon as Baillie set foot on shore at Dover on 12 April, he was arrested and taken to the Marshalsea. The letters were, however, conveyed in secret by Lord Cobham to John Lesley, who, with the help of the Spanish ambassador, composed other letters of a less incriminating nature to be laid before William Cecil, Queen Elizabeth I's chief advisor.

The scheme might have been successful had Cecil not made use of an informant, named William Herle (or Thomas Herle in some sources), to gain Baillie's confidence. Herle pretended to be an Irish priest, a prisoner sympathetic to Mary's cause. Herle described Baillie as "fearful, full of words, glorious, and given to the cup, a man easily read". Herle had also gained the confidence of John Lesley, and a complete exposure of the whole plot was imminent when an indiscretion on Herle's part convinced Baillie that he was betrayed. Baillie tried to warn Lesley by a letter, but this was intercepted. Baillie was conveyed from the Marshalsea to the Tower of London, where he refused to decipher his letters, and was put on the rack. The following inscription on the walls of Beauchamp Tower, still visible on the walls, records his reflections inspired by the situation: "L. H. S. 1571 die 10 Aprilis. Wise men ought to se what they do, to examine before they speake; to prove before they take in hand; to beware whose company they use; and, above all things, to whom they truste. |— Charles Bailly."

One night, the figure of a man appeared at Baillie's bedside. He claimed to be John Story, whom Baillie knew to be in the Tower awaiting execution. In reality the figure was that of an informant called Parker sent to entrap him, but Baillie was again unsuspecting. He took Parker's advice to try to gain credit and favour with Cecil by deciphering the letters of the bishop of Ross. Baillie also revealed the story of the abstracted packet of letters, and sought to persuade Cecil to grant him his liberty by offering to act as a double-agent and watch the correspondence of John Lesley. That Baillie gained nothing by following the advice of his second friendly counsellor is attested by an inscription in the Beauchamp Tower as follows: 'Principium eapientie Timor Domini, I. H. S. X. P. S. Be friend to no one. Be enemye to none. Anno D. 1571, 10 Septr. The most unhappy man in the world is he that is not pacient in adversities; for men are not killed with the adversities they have, but with ye impacience which they suffer. Tout vient apoient, quy peult attendre. Gli sospiri ne son testimoni veri dell' angolcia mia, aet. 29. Charles Bailly.'

== Later life and death ==
Baillie was probably released about the same time as John Lesley, in 1573. At any rate it appears, from a letter in the State Papers, that in 1574 he was in Antwerp. He died 27 December 1625, aged 85, and was interred in the churchyard of La Hulpe, a village near Brussels, where, in the inscription on his tombstone, he is designated as "Sir Charles Bailly, secretaire de la Royne d'Ecosse" ("Secretary of the Queen of Scots").
