= Felten =

Felten is a surname. Notable people with the surname include:

- David L. Felten, American neuroscientist
- Edward Felten, a professor of computer science and public affairs at Princeton University
- Elke Felten (born 1943), German sprint canoer
- John Felten, American singer and member of The Diamonds
- Major Felten (1904-1975), American artist and illustrator
- Margrith von Felten (born 1944), Swiss politician and lawyer
- Olle Felten (born 1953), Swedish politician
- Yury Felten, a court architect to Catherine the Great, Empress of Russia

== See also ==
- Felton (disambiguation)
- Fulton (disambiguation)
