= Henry Felton =

Henry Felton may refer to:

- Henry Felton (clergyman) (1679–1740), English clergyman and academic
- Sir Henry Felton, 2nd Baronet (1619–1690), English politician
- Sir Henry Felton, 1st Baronet (died 1624), of the Felton baronets

== See also ==
- Felton (disambiguation)
