= Felton =

Felton may refer to:

== Places ==
in Australia

- Felton, Queensland

in Canada

- Felton, Ontario
- Felton River, in Estrie, Quebec

in Cuba

- Felton, Mayarí

in the United Kingdom

- Felton, Herefordshire
- Felton, Northumberland
- Felton, Somerset
- Felton, a former name of the parish of Whitchurch, Somerset

in the United States

- Felton, California
- Felton, Delaware
- Felton, Minnesota
- Felton, Pennsylvania
- Felton Township, Minnesota

== Other uses ==
- Felton (given name)
- Felton (surname)

== See also ==
- Feltham
- Felten (disambiguation)
- Fulton (disambiguation)
