= Thomas Felton =

Thomas Felton may refer to:

- Thomas Felton (KG) (died 1381), fought at the Battle of Crecy, and the capture of Calais
- Thomas Felton (martyr) (1567–1588), English martyr
- Sir Thomas Felton, 4th Baronet (1649–1709), English politician
- Tom Felton (born 1987), English actor and musician
