= Andy Lyons =

Andy Lyons is the name of:

- Andy Lyons (English footballer) (born 1966), English football coach and former midfielder
- Andy Lyons (Irish footballer) (born 2000), Irish football defender for Blackpool
