= Felton (given name) =

Felton is a masculine given name. Notable people with the name include:

- Felton Grandison Clark (1903-1970), African-American university president
- Felton Gale, Football coach
- Felton Hervey, English politician, and member of the British royal household
- Felton Hervey-Bathurst, English soldier
- Felton Holt, English general
- Felton Jarvis, Record producer
- Felton Legere, Canadian politician
- Felton Messina, Martial arts instructor
- Felton Perry, Actor
- Felton Pilate, Singer, songwriter, record producer
- Felton Spencer, Basketball player
- Felton Stratton, Baseball player
- Felton Turner, Crime victim
- Felton T. Wright, Football coach
