= Ridolfi plot =

1571 plan to overthrow Elizabeth I of England and replace her with Mary, Queen of Scots

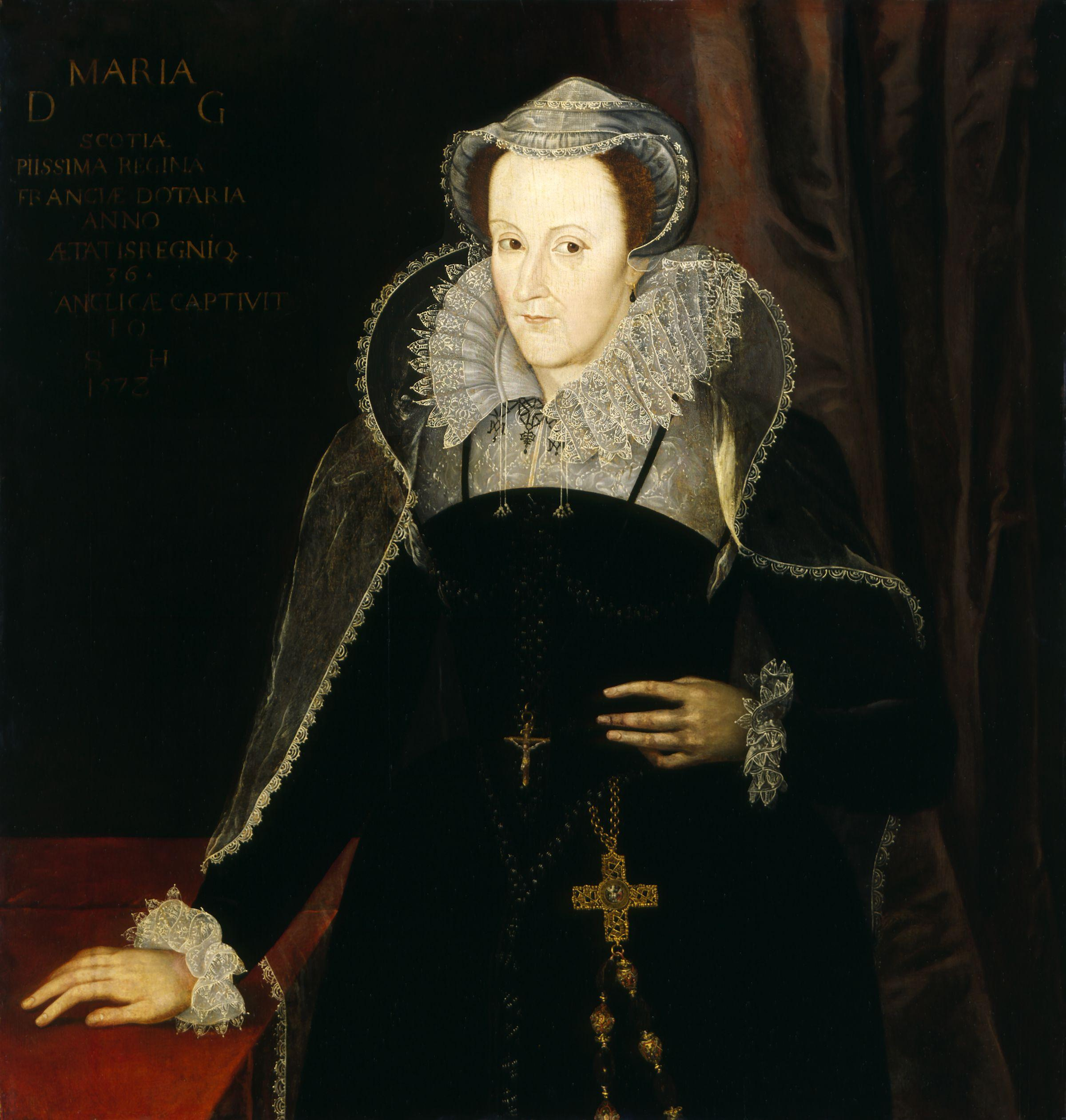
The Ridolfi plot was meant to put Mary Stuart on the throne of England.

The Ridolfi plot was a Catholic plot in 1571 to overthrow Queen Elizabeth I of England and replace her with Mary, Queen of Scots. The plot was hatched and planned by Roberto Ridolfi, an international banker who was able to travel between Brussels, Rome and Madrid to gather support without attracting too much suspicion.

== Background ==
Thomas Howard, 4th Duke of Norfolk, a Roman Catholic with a Protestant education, a second cousin of Queen Elizabeth's and the wealthiest landowner in the country, had been proposed as a possible husband for Mary since her imprisonment in 1568. This suited Norfolk, who had ambitions and felt Elizabeth persistently undervalued him. In pursuit of his goals, he agreed to support the Northern Rebellion, though he quickly lost his nerve. Norfolk was imprisoned in the Tower of London for nine months and only freed under house arrest when he confessed all and begged for mercy. Pope Pius V, in his 1570 papal bull Regnans in Excelsis, excommunicated the Protestant Elizabeth and permitted all faithful Catholics to do all they could to depose her. The majority of English Catholics ignored the bull, but in response to it, Elizabeth became much harsher to Catholics and their sympathisers.

John Milsom has proposed that Tallis' Spem in alium, was commissioned to have covert political and allegorical meaning by the Earl of Arundel or the Duke of Norfolk, as the text originates from the Book of Judith that concerns the slaying of Holofernes in order to save Israel. This would have made it an allegory for an eventual assassination of Elizabeth. Despite the allegorical association, and Spem in alium appearing in the Nonsuch palace catalogue for its presumed performance with Arundel or Norfolk in attendance, there is no evidence that Tallis was involved in the plot himself.

== Plot ==
Roberto Ridolfi, a Florentine banker and ardent Roman Catholic, had been involved in the planning of the Northern rebellion and had been plotting to overthrow Elizabeth as early as 1569. With the failure of the rebellion, he concluded that foreign intervention was needed to restore Catholicism and bring Mary to the English throne, and so he began to contact potential conspirators. Mary's advisor, John Lesley, the Bishop of Ross, gave his assent to the plot as the way to free Mary. The plan was to have the Duke of Alba invade from the Netherlands with 10,000 men, foment a rebellion of the northern English nobility, murder Elizabeth, and marry Mary to Thomas Howard. Ridolfi optimistically estimated half of all English peers were Catholic and could muster in excess of 39,000 men.

Secret documents from the Vatican and Spanish General Archive of Simancas confirm that Howard had privately declared himself a Catholic to secure the support of the Pope and Philip II. Knowing that Pius V would not authorize another marriage between Mary and a Protestant (the Pope had already shown his disapproval at the marriage between Mary and the Protestant Earl of Bothwell since at that time he was considered the prime suspect in the murder of the Scottish queen's second husband, Henry Stewart, Lord Darnley, even coming to the brink of excommunicating the Scottish Queen over the marriage), Ridolfi acted as an intermediary by personally traveling to Rome to present to Pius with letters and verbal assurances—authorized by Norfolk—stating that the Duke was a secret Catholic who had only conformed to the Church of England for political survival. The Pope, although remaining cautious because both Howard and Mary had already been married three times, gave his approval to the marriage plan and the plot, seeing it as an opportunity to restore Catholicism in England if Elizabeth fell and the Duke and Mary ascended to the throne.

=== List of co-conspirators ===
Ridolfi's co-conspirators, some of them mentioned above, played an important role in the plot to overthrow Elizabeth:

Don Guerau de Espés: Spain's ambassador to England, who was expelled after the discovery of his involvement. Elizabeth had raised her concerns about de Espés' behaviour with Anna of Austria.

John Lesley: the Bishop of Ross, who was Mary Stuart's chief agent; arranged meetings and delivered letters for Mary during her house arrest.

Thomas Howard, 4th Duke of Norfolk, who was Queen Elizabeth I's second cousin. He was to marry Mary, Queen of Scots and together with her restore Catholic rule to the English and Scottish thrones. After the plot was discovered he was given a day-long trial that ended with his execution.

Mary, Queen of Scots: after it became clear that Elizabeth I was not going to restore her to the Scottish throne or return her to France, Mary plotted for her freedom. She wrote to Ridolfi denouncing the French and soliciting Spanish aid, while simultaneously professing friendship and loyalty to Elizabeth I and England. Giving her consent to the plot in March 1571, her role was to marry the Duke of Norfolk, with the plan that when the troops arrived in London she would be returned to the Scottish throne. However, when the plot was uncovered, her deep involvement in it altered Elizabeth's opinion of Mary; Elizabeth never spoke of restoring her to the throne again.

King Philip II, who welcomed Ridolfi to court and, with the council, discussed the plot's pros and cons. He supported overthrowing Elizabeth and later came to support the assassination. Philip, however, disapproved of the papal bull against Elizabeth because, according to Cyril Hamshere, he feared it would "prompt Elizabeth to take reprisals against Catholics."

Fernando Álvarez de Toledo, 3rd Duke of Alba, who was the leader of the Spanish army stationed in the Netherlands and was to lead more than 10,000 men to Harwich or Portsmouth. His army was to invade England and make its way to London to establish Mary on the throne.

Pope Pius V, who made Ridolfi his papal agent in England in 1567, was not only aware of the plot but gave his written approval in a letter for Ridolfi to take to Philip II.

=== Discovery ===
In 1571, Elizabeth's intelligence network was sending her information about a plot against her life. By gaining the confidence of Spain's ambassador to England, John Hawkins learned the details of the conspiracy and notified the government so as to arrest the plotters. Elizabeth was also sent a private warning by Cosimo I de' Medici, Grand Duke of Tuscany, who had learned of the plot against her. Charles Baillie, Ridolfi's messenger, was arrested on c.12 April 1571 at Dover for carrying compromising letters, and by the use of torture and prison informers such as William Herle, he was forced to reveal the cipher of the messages he carried.

On 29 August 1571, Norfolk's secretaries William Barker and Robert Higford entrusted to Thomas Browne, a Shrewsbury draper, what was purported to be a bag of silver coin for delivery to Laurence Bannister, one of Norfolk's officials in the north of England. Browne grew suspicious of the bag's weight, opened it, and discovered 600 pounds in gold from the French ambassador, destined for Scotland on Mary's behalf, and ciphered letters. Because he knew Norfolk was under suspicion, Browne reported his find to William Cecil, 1st Baron Burghley, the Secretary of State. Higford and Barker were interrogated, the letters were partly deciphered, and a search for the cipher key at Howard House uncovered a ciphered letter from Mary Stuart hidden under a doormat.

Norfolk's servants were arrested and interrogated, and confessions were extracted from them by threats or application of torture. Sir Thomas Smith and Thomas Wilson were sent to confront Norfolk, who claimed the money was for his own private purposes. The deciphered letter, however, proved that he was lying. Unaware of his servants' confessions or the survival of letters which, contrary to his instructions, had not been burnt, he denied the charges against him. On 7 September, the queen's warrant for conveying him to the Tower of London arrived. Thereupon, the duke admitted a degree of involvement in the transmission of money and correspondence to Mary's Scottish supporters. In January 1572, Norfolk was tried and convicted on three counts of high treason, and on 2 June he was beheaded on Tower Hill.

Guerau de Spes, the Spanish ambassador, was expelled from the country in January 1571. Still abroad when the plot was discovered, Ridolfi never returned to England; he became a Florentine senator in 1600.

=== Ridolfi's role ===
Despite his plot's ultimate failure, Roberto Ridolfi's story is surprising and memorable. He had played the relatively minor role of banker but nevertheless found himself at the centre of a major plot to overthrow the English government. Ridolfi had been jailed in 1568 because of a rumour that he had distributed money to dissenting nobles associated with the Northern Rebellion. The Pope did, in fact, give him 12,000 crowns for that purpose, but Ridolfi was released in 1570 because no evidence could be found to incriminate him. Even after his arrest and release, Ridolfi remained a spy for the Pope. Ridolfi's banking connections helped him become acquainted with the Duke of Norfolk, and he became a supporter of a marriage between Norfolk and Mary, Queen of Scots, who would, if the plot succeeded, rule England and reinstate Catholicism there.

After Norfolk's release from prison in August 1570, Ridolfi "picked up the broken threads of Catholic intrigue". Ridolfi was in an advantageous position to orchestrate a Catholic rebellion in England, since he was employed by the Pope, France, and Spain, and had ties to the Catholic contingent in England. He could use banking as an excuse to travel among these groups for the purpose of conspiring. When he travelled to mainland Europe to inform King Phillip and the Pope of the plot, it is believed that he was still working for Elizabeth.

=== Plot failure ===
The Duke of Alba, the Spanish Viceroy in the Netherlands who was to lead the attack on England, felt Ridolfi was too garrulous to be the leader of a conspiracy, but Spanish Ambassador Don Guerau de Spes described Ridolfi as "A person of great truth and virtue and an intimate friend of mine." Ridolfi's talkative nature did eventually cause him trouble, as he was not very discreet and trumpeted his plan all over Europe. His boasting was partially responsible for the plot failure, as he told it to Cosimo I de' Medici, Grand Duke of Tuscany who immediately informed Elizabeth of the plot.

== Aftermath ==
Ridolfi escaped execution, unlike some of his co-conspirators, and lived until 1612.

=== Modern criticism ===
According to historian Cyril Hamshere, retrospective critics of the conspiracy cited a number of reasons why the Ridolfi Plot would have been doomed to fail even if it had not been discovered prematurely. For one, the small number of Spanish soldiers (between 6,000 and 10,000) would have been absurdly inadequate to the task of overthrowing the English government. Additionally, the vagueness of the invasion point was a logistical shortcoming. The plan was to land at either Harwich or Portsmouth, but Ridolfi apparently did not know exactly where Harwich was. Also dubious was Ridolfi's reliance on the Duke of Norfolk, who was regarded as a bad leader and was not even a Catholic. This did not make him an ideal co-conspirator, but, according to Hamshere, "his main merit lay in his title: in 1571 he was the only Duke in England".

Norfolk's Protestantism was but one irony of the Ridolfi Plot: Norfolk and Mary, Queen of Scots had each been married three times before their proposed marriage to each other. Pope Pius was, apparently, willing to grant Mary an annulment of her marriage to her imprisoned husband, but the notion of two thrice-wed royals leading England back to Catholicism is somewhat problematic, nonetheless.

== Media representations ==
The Ridolfi Plot was covered in Mary Queen of Scots (1971), starring Vanessa Redgrave as Mary and Glenda Jackson as Elizabeth.

An altered and fictionalised version of the Ridolfi Plot was featured in the film Elizabeth (1998), starring Cate Blanchett as Elizabeth.

== See also ==
- Sir Francis Walsingham
- Throckmorton Plot
- Babington Plot
