= Roberto di Ridolfo =

16th-century Italian nobleman; conspired to assassinate Queen Elizabeth I of England

Roberto Ridolfi (or di Ridolfo) (18 November 1531 – 18 February 1612) was an Italian and Florentine nobleman and conspirator.

== Biography ==
Ridolfi belonged to a famous family of Florence, where he was born. As a banker he had business connections with England, and about 1555 he settled in London, where he soon became a person of some importance, consorting with William Cecil and other prominent men. In Trinity term 1564 he was recorded as "Robertus Ridolphy, of London, merchant stranger" in a case in Common Pleas.

During the early years of Elizabeth's reign he began to take a more active part in politics, associating with the discontented Roman Catholics in England and communicating with their friends abroad. In 1570, he set to work on a plot against Elizabeth I which usually bears his name: the Ridolfi plot.

His intention was to marry Mary, Queen of Scots, to the Duke of Norfolk and to place her on the English throne. With the aid of John Lesley, bishop of Ross, he gained the consent of these high personages to the conspiracy, and then in 1571 he visited the Duke of Alva at Brussels, Pope Pius V at Rome, and Philip II at Madrid to explain to them his scheme and to gain their assistance.

However, his messenger to Lesley, Charles Baillie (1542–1625), was seized at Dover and revealed the existence of the plot under torture. Consequently, Norfolk and Lesley were arrested, the former being condemned to death in January 1572. Ridolfi, who was then in Paris, could do nothing when he heard the news that his scheme had collapsed. Afterwards he served the Pope, but much of his later life was spent in Florence, where he became a senator, and where he died on 18 February 1612.
