= Hiroyuki Hamada (martial artist) =

Japanese karateka (1925–2003)

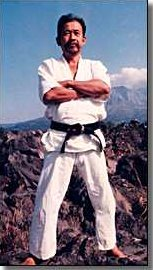
So Shihan Hiroyuki Hamada

Hiroyuki Hamada (October 29, 1925 – September 16, 2003) was a Japanese martial artist, master of Felton Messina and the founder of Nihon Koden Shindo Ryu Karatedo.

== Early life ==
Hamada was born in Satsumasendai, Kagoshima on October 29, 1925. At the age of 15 he began to practice the Okinawan style of Karate called Tomari-Ha in 1939. In March 1943, he graduated from high school after having lost 2 years of classes due to World War II, time which he used to concentrate in the study of Karate. That year he began to study other Okinawan styles such as, Shuri-Te and To-Te. Between April 1943 and March 1944 he dedicated himself fully to the practice and perfection of Karate.

In April 1944, he joined the Japanese Marines. By the time the war ended in 1945, he was part of one of the Air Force squads from Kurashiki. When the news of Japan's defeat reached him, he spent 10 days considering if he should commit Seppuku. After those 10 days he firmly decided to live and help others through Karate-Do. In August 1945, he returns to the city of Satsumasendai.

== Creation of the style ==
Between 1945 and 1952 he intensified his Karate practices, traveling throughout Japan and dedicating himself to the study of two styles of Karate: Nihon Shindo Karate-Do and Nihon-Den Karate-Do. In 1952 he joined the Fire Department in his hometown and for the first time taught Karate. On the morning of March 28, 1964, in a Shinto temple called Isekotaigingie in the province of Mie, Japan, he created Nihon Koden Shindo Ryu. This new style of Karate he created was based on the modifications he made to the techniques he learned from the other styles of karate.

== Actuality ==
In 1975 he traveled to the Dominican Republic with Professor Jamaguchi (6th Dan in Judo) and Kenji Moriyama (5th Dan) to give Karate-Do classes. In one month, he performed exhibitions throughout the island and left Felton Messina in charge of the style in the Dominican Republic. In April 1980 he retired from being Chief of the Fire Department in Satsumasendai. He dedicated his whole life to the practice and teaching of Karatedo and was the So-shihan (Supreme Master) of Nihon Koden Shindo Ryu until his death. Before his death in 2003, he gave Felton Messina the rank of So Shihan and left him in charge of the style outside Japan. The person in charge of the style in Japan is Hamada's nephew So Shihan Eturou Takeshita.

== Death ==
Hamada died in on September 16, 2003, at the age of 77.

== See also ==
- Nihon Koden Shindo Ryu
- Felton Messina

== Sources ==
1. The Physics of Karatedo by Felton Messina ISBN 1-4196-9459-6
2. English Site
3. https://web.archive.org/web/20061231200334/http://www.redmarcial.com.ar/disciplinas/shindoryu.htm (in Spanish)
4. https://web.archive.org/web/20070618112311/http://www.shindoryu.com.ve/fundador.htm (in Spanish)
5. https://web.archive.org/web/20160303180125/http://shindoryu.890m.com/nacimiento.html (in Spanish)
6. https://web.archive.org/web/20081001040138/http://www.nikoshindo.org/espanol/hamada.htm (in Spanish)
7. https://web.archive.org/web/20081001022044/http://www.nikoshindo.org/espanol/america.htm (in Spanish)
