= Bryan Griffiths =

English footballer

Personal information
- Date of birth: 26 January 1965 (age 61)
- Place of birth: Prescot, England
- Position: Midfielder

Senior career*
| Years | Team | Apps | (Gls) |
| 19??–1988 | St Helens Town | ? | (?) |
| 1988–1993 | Wigan Athletic | 189 | (44) |
| 1993–1995 | Blackpool | 57 | (17) |
| 1994–1995 | → Scarborough (loan) | 5 | (1) |
| 1995 | Telford United | 17 | (2) |
| 1995–1997 | Southport | 36 | (6) |
| 1999–2000 | St Helens Town | ? | (?) |
| Total | | 251 | (62) |
- * Club domestic league appearances and goals

Bryan Griffiths (born 26 January 1965) is an English former professional footballer. He played as a left winger.

Born in Prescot, Lancashire, Griffiths began his career with St Helens Town in the 1980s. He signed professional forms with Wigan Athletic in 1988, and went on to make almost 200 league appearances for the Latics, scoring 44 goals.

In 1993, he was signed by Billy Ayre's Blackpool. In two years at Bloomfield Road he made 57 appearances and scored 17 goals.

When Ayre became manager of Scarborough in 1994, he signed Griffiths on loan. He scored once in his five games for the Yorkshiremen.

Griffiths moved into non-league football with Telford United in 1995.

He finished his career back with his first club, St. Helens Town, in 2000.
