= Marie-Claude Felton =

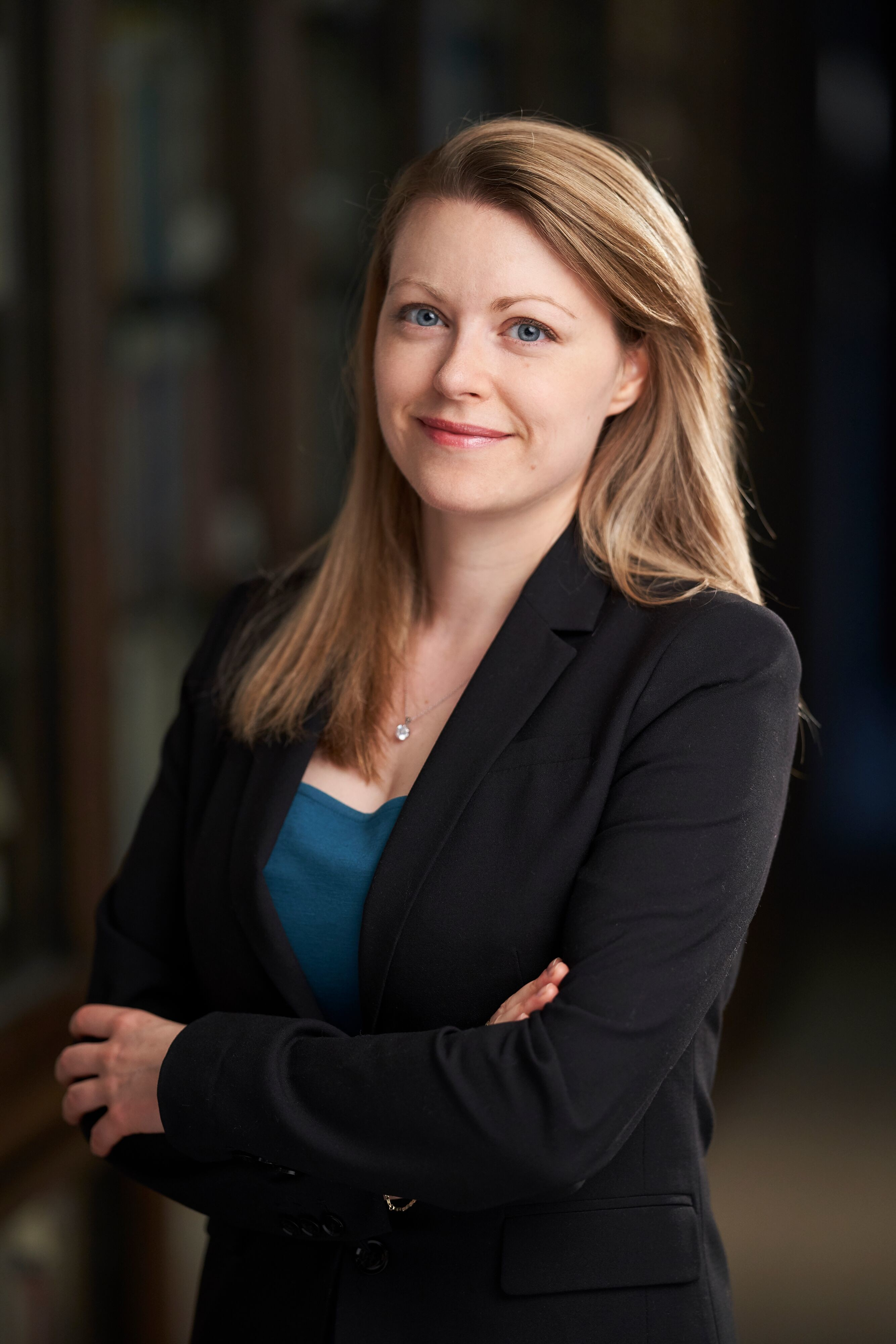
Marie-Claude Felton, PhD

Marie-Claude Felton (born 1981), is a French-Canadian writer, teacher, acquisitions editor and historian who specializes in 18th-century France. Her book, Maîtres de leurs ouvrages: l’édition à compte d’auteur à Paris au XVIIIe siècle, made significant contributions to the understanding of publishing practices and the myriad issues relating to changing conceptions of literary property.

== Biography ==
Felton was born in Montreal, Quebec. She holds a B.A. (First-class honours in History) from McGill University, an M.A. (History) from Université Laval, and a PhD from UQÀM and the EHESS, Paris mentored by world-renown historian Roger Chartier. She was awarded several prizes and research fellowships in Canada, the United States, France and the United Kingdom. Her dissertation of Pierre-Joseph-François Luneau de Boisjermain, which received the prize for Best dissertation of 2011 at the Faculté des sciences humaines of UQÀM, was published in 2014. She held a post-doctoral fellowship at Harvard University and was Banting Post-Doctoral Fellow in the Department of Languages, Literatures and Cultures at McGill. She was awarded a fellowship at the Bodleian Library at the University of Oxford (UK) to work with their collection of rare books.

== Self-publishing in the 18th century ==
In her book, Maîtres de leurs ouvrages: l'édition à compte d'auteur à Paris au XVIIIe siècle, Felton traces in detail the number of Parisian authors who chose to self-publish their works between 1750 and 1791, which indeed rose dramatically after 1777, as well as the social and professional composition of this group of authors, the subject and design of their books, and their place in the literary economy of the late eighteenth century. She convincingly shows that authors who self-published were not marginal Rousseau du ruisseau (marginal young writers) filled with resentment towards the institutions of the ancien regime, memorably portrayed by Robert Darnton. Felton presents a much more positive take. Many of these authors were office-holders or army commanders, and some enjoyed pensions and connections to the institutions of the literary world. Self-publishing was a respectable choice for bringing one's work to the public, not necessarily leading to the loss of face associated today with vanity presses. Felton's study is the first sustained and comprehensive discussion of self-publishing in the eighteenth century, establishing the contours of the phenomenon.

== Publications ==
- Maîtres de leurs ouvrages: l’édition à compte d’auteur à Paris au XVIIIe siècle. Oxford: Voltaire Foundation. 2014. ISBN 978-0-7294-1081-6
- La police des métiers du livre à Paris, au siècle des lumières. BNF Éditions. 2017. ISBN. 978-2-7177-2736-4 / 9782717727364
- Interacting with print. University of Chicago Book Press. 2017. ISBN. 9780226469140
- Exploring the early modern underground: Freethinkers, heretics, spies. Honoré Champion Paris. 2020. ISBN. 9782745353467
