= Leon Felton =

Rhodesian rugby league footballer

Personal information
- Full name: Leon Felton
- Born: 9 December 1979 (age 45); Rhodesia

Playing information
- Position: Fullback, Centre, Wing
Club
Years	Team	Pld	T	G	FG	P
Sep 2001	St. Helens	2	0	0	0	0
Feb 2002–Aug 02	Warrington Wolves	8	0	0	0	0
2002	→ Leigh Centurions (loan)
	Total	10	0	0	0	0
- Source: As of 8 December 2016

Leon Felton (born 9 December 1979) is a Rhodesian/Australian former professional rugby league footballer who played in the 2000s. He played at club level for Canterbury Bulldogs, St. Helens, Warrington Wolves, and Leigh Centurions (loan), as a fullback, wing, or centre.
