= Robert Felton (cricketer) =

English cricketer (1909–1982)

Robert Felton (27 December 1909 – 4 October 1982) was an English first-class cricketer active 1935–48 who played for Middlesex. He was born in Streatham; died in Ealing.
