= Felton Turner =

American activist (1933–2006)

Felton Turner (April 2, 1933 – April 23, 2006) was an African-American man whose survival from a vicious attack on March 7, 1960, helped galvanize the city of Houston, Texas during the Civil Rights Movement.

== Activism ==
Turner was a 27-year-old unemployed awning installer in Houston who fell victim to the enmity caused by continuing sit-in demonstrations against segregation. Those protests, coming just over a month after the first such actions in Greensboro, North Carolina, had begun on March 4, 1960, at the local Weingarten's store by students from Texas Southern University. On March 7, Turner, who was not involved in the students' actions, was walking just a block from his home when he was abducted at gunpoint and transported to a deserted wooded area.

During the ride, Turner was continually beaten with a chain for approximately 30 minutes. He watched the men carve two sets of "KKK" (in reference to the Ku Klux Klan) into his stomach, then hang him by his knees to a nearby tree.

Following the departure of his captors, Turner was able to free himself, quickly calling police. On March 15, 18-year-old Ronald Gene Erickson was arrested for the crime following a routine traffic stop.

The attack helped awaken the African-American community in Houston to the continued injustices committed and also helped gain support for the students actions, including expanding the sit-ins to the downtown's Walgreens stores. Over the next three years, virtually all businesses in downtown Houston were desegregated.

== Legacy ==
A 1998 documentary entitled The Strange Demise of Jim Crow: How Houston Desegregated Its Public Accommodations, 1959-1963 examines the Turner attack as part of the overall picture of civil rights in the city.
