= Margrith von Felten =

Swiss politician

Member of the Grand Council of Basel-Stadt
- In office 2001–2007

Member of the National Council
- In office 1991–1998

Member of the Grand Council of Basel-Stadt
- In office 1988–1991

Personal details
- Born: 30 December 1944 (age 81) Basel, Basel-Stadt, Switzerland
- Party: Social Democratic Party (formerly); Basels starke Alternative (current)
- Children: 2
- Occupation: politician, lawyer

Margrith von Felten (born 30 December 1944) is a Swiss politician and lawyer.

== Biography ==
Margrith von Felten was born on 30 December 1944 in Basel. She holds citizenship in Basel, Winznau, and Stein.

Von Felten works as a lawyer. From 1988 to 1991, she represented the Social Democratic Party of Switzerland in the Grand Council of Basel-Stadt. In the 1991 Swiss federal election, she was elected to the National Council of Switzerland. She sat in the National Council until 1998, when she left the Swiss Democrats and joined the Basels Starke Alternative due to political differences in economic policy with the former. She ran on a joint left-green-feminist list in the 1998 general election but lost. From 2001 to 2007, she served again on the Grand Council of Basel-Stadt.

Von Felten is widowed and has two children.
