= Peter Higham =

English footballer (1930–2026)

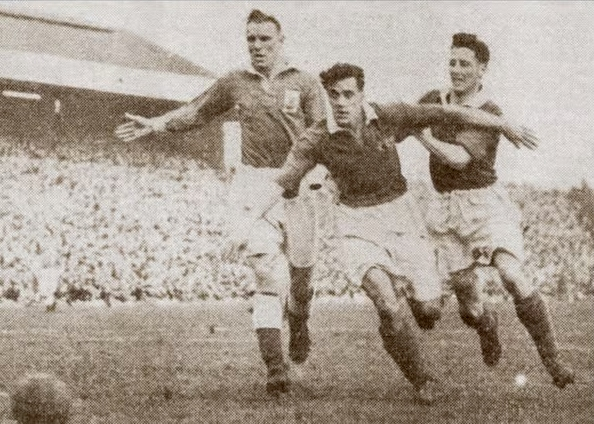
- Higham in 1950

Personal information
- Date of birth: 8 November 1930
- Place of birth: Wigan, England
- Date of death: 3 July 2026 (aged 95)
- Place of death: Wigan, England
- Position: Forward

Senior career*
Years	Team	Apps	(Gls)
1948–1949	Wigan Athletic	4	(0)
1949–1950	Portsmouth	1	(0)
1950–1952	Bolton Wanderers	0	(0)
1952–1955	Preston North End	15	(10)
1955–1958	Nottingham Forest	61	(20)
1958–1959	Doncaster Rovers	22	(6)
1959–1960	Wigan Athletic	29	(20)
1960	Rhyl		
1960–1961	Morecambe		
1961–1962	Wigan Athletic	31	(26)
- Stalybridge Celtic
1965–1966	Buxton	44	(33)
1966–1968	Mossley	21	(17)
- * Club domestic league appearances and goals

Peter Higham (8 November 1930 – 3 July 2026) was an English footballer who played as a forward.

== Career ==
Born in Wigan, Higham served in the Royal Marines as part of his National Service, making one appearance for Portsmouth as an amateur in 1950. He later joined Bolton Wanderers, but left the club without making a first team appearance, and signed for Preston North End in 1952.

Higham was sold to Nottingham Forest in 1955 for a fee of £8,000. He was part of the Nottingham Forest side that won promotion to the First Division during the 1956–57 season.

== Death ==
Higham died in Wigan on 3 July 2026, aged 95. At the time of his death, he was noted as being Portsmouth F.C.'s oldest living player.
