= Felton Messina =

Dominican Republic karateka

Felton Messina started practicing Karatedo in 1966, while studying in the University of Puerto Rico, city of Mayagüez, supervised by his first teacher, the Puerto Rican Edwin Hernández in a style called Okinawan Kenpo Karatedo. In 1968 he was promoted to black belt 1st Degree and received the grade certificate from Edwin Hernández. In 1969, Felton Messina returned to the Dominican Republic having graduated as an electrical engineer. When he arrived in Santo Domingo, the only martial arts practiced there, were Judo and Taekwondo. When a group of young people heard of his arrival, they asked him to teach them the style of striking martial art that he had learned in Puerto Rico. In 1969 the Kenpo Karatedo Association was formed by Felton Messina, and this new style spread throughout the whole Caribbean nation. While being president of the Dominican Judo Federation,, he was advised by the president of the Dominican Olympic Committee, to form what to this day is known as the Dominican Karate Federation (DOKAFE), which was recognized as well by the Dominican Olympic Committee. With the recognition of DOKAFE by the Dominican Olympic Committee Felton Messina quits from his position as President of the Dominican Judo Federation and becomes the first president of the Dominican Karate Federation. In 1975, Felton Messina stops practicing Okinawan Kenpo and begins practicing the Nihon Koden Shindo Ryu style of Karatedo under the teachings of Hiroyuki Hamada, native from the province of Sendai, Japan.

== Dominican Republic ==
Felton Messina, aside from being known as one of the pioneers of Karatedo in Puerto Rico, is also known as the "father" of Karatedo in the Dominican Republic. He earned this mention because he was the first person who took Karate to the Dominican Republic and spread it throughout the whole nation, having the Kenpo Karatedo Association, in which he directed, more than 6,500 students throughout the whole nation. He is also responsible of introducing Karatedo to the military forces of the Dominican Republic, training them in self-defense and competitive Karate. Felton Messina was also coach of the Dominican Karate Team training them, in various occasions, to go to the Panamerican and World karatedo tournaments, where his students won in several occasions.

He was the first Dominican to write a book about Karatedo (specifically about the style Nihon Koden Shindo Ryu), published in 1979.

At the moment he has already ended his second Karatedo book titled "The Physics of Karatedo".

== Career ==
He started practicing Nihon Koden Shindo Ryu in 1975 when Hiroyuki Hamada was invited, by Felton Messina, to teach the style that he had created. Hamada spent one month in the Dominican Republic teaching Felton and his advanced students from the Kenpo Karatedo Association. Before returning to Japan, Hamada promoted Felton Messina to 3rd degree black belt, after giving him an extensive exam. Felton Messina traveled four times to Japan to practice at Hamada's dojo, where he was promoted successively to higher ranks until he reached the highest rank in Nihon Koden Shindo Ryu which is So-Shihan, that translated to English means "Master of Masters". This rank was given to him in 1999 in Japan, in the presence of 10 of his more advanced students from different countries in the Americas that traveled with him. The rank of So-Shihan given to Felton gives him power to expand the style Nihon Koden Shindo Ryu throughout the whole world, except Japan. Felton Messina has spread the style in the following countries: Venezuela, Cuba, Puerto Rico, Cambodia, United States of America, Ecuador, and the Dominican Republic. He is the only Dominican that has been able to expand Karatedo internationally, founding many karate schools in the countries mentioned above.

== Rank ==
Messina at the moment possesses the Rank of So-Shihan (10th degree black belt) for all the world except Japan where he holds the rank of 7th degree black belt. The World Karate Federation (WKF) recognizes his rank of 7th degree black belt.

He also possesses the rank of 1st degree black belt in the style of Iaido, Muso Shinden Ryu. This rank was given to him, in Japan, by Iwagoro Setoguchi in 1977.
