= Thomas Howard, 4th Duke of Norfolk =

English politician and nobleman (1536 or 1538–1572)

His Grace The Duke of Norfolk KG PC
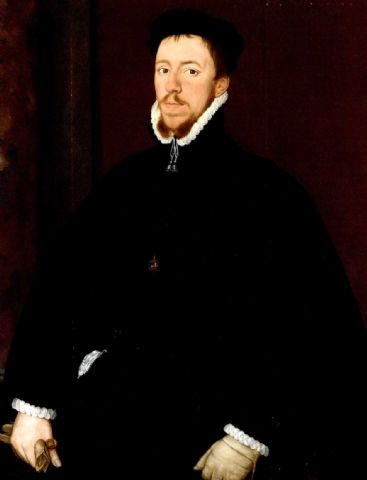
- Thomas Howard painted by an unknown artist, c. 1565.

Personal details
- Born: 10 March 1536 or 1538 Kenninghall, Norfolk
- Died: 2 June 1572 (aged 34 or 36) Tower Hill, London, England
- Resting place: Chapel of St Peter ad Vincula, Tower of London
- Spouse(s): Mary FitzAlan; Margaret Audley; Elizabeth Leyburne
- Children: Philip Howard, 13th Earl of Arundel; Thomas Howard, 1st Earl of Suffolk; Lord William Howard; Lady Elizabeth Howard; Lady Margaret Howard
- Parent(s): Henry Howard, Earl of Surrey; Frances de Vere

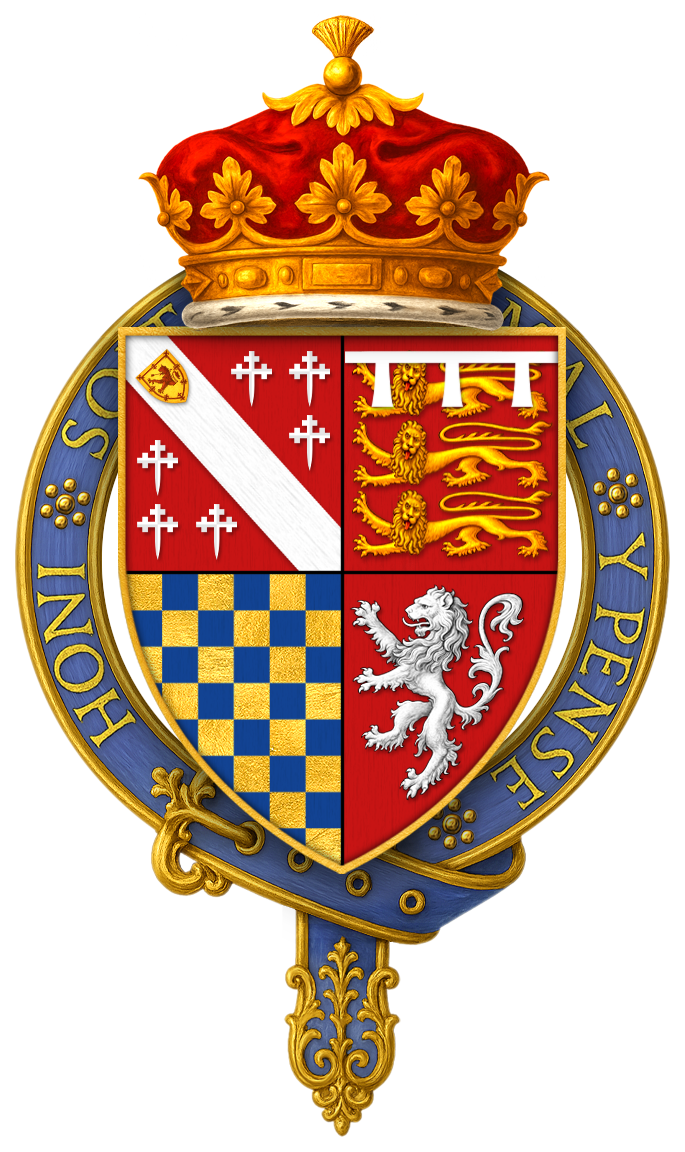
Arms of Thomas Howard, 4th Duke of Norfolk, KG: Quarterly of 4: 1: Gules, on a bend between six cross-crosslets fitchy argent an escutcheon or charged with a demi-lion rampant pierced through the mouth by an arrow within a double tressure flory counterflory of the first (Howard, with augmentation of honour); 2: Gules, three lions passant guardant in pale or armed and langued azure a label of three points argent (Plantagenet, arms of Thomas of Brotherton, 1st Earl of Norfolk); 3: Chequy or and azure (de Warenne, Earl of Surrey); 4: Gules, a lion rampant argent (Mowbray)

Thomas Howard, 4th Duke of Norfolk, KG (10 March 1536 or 1538 – 2 June 1572), was an English nobleman and politician. He was a second cousin of Queen Elizabeth I and held many high offices during the earlier part of her reign.

== Early life, family, and religion ==
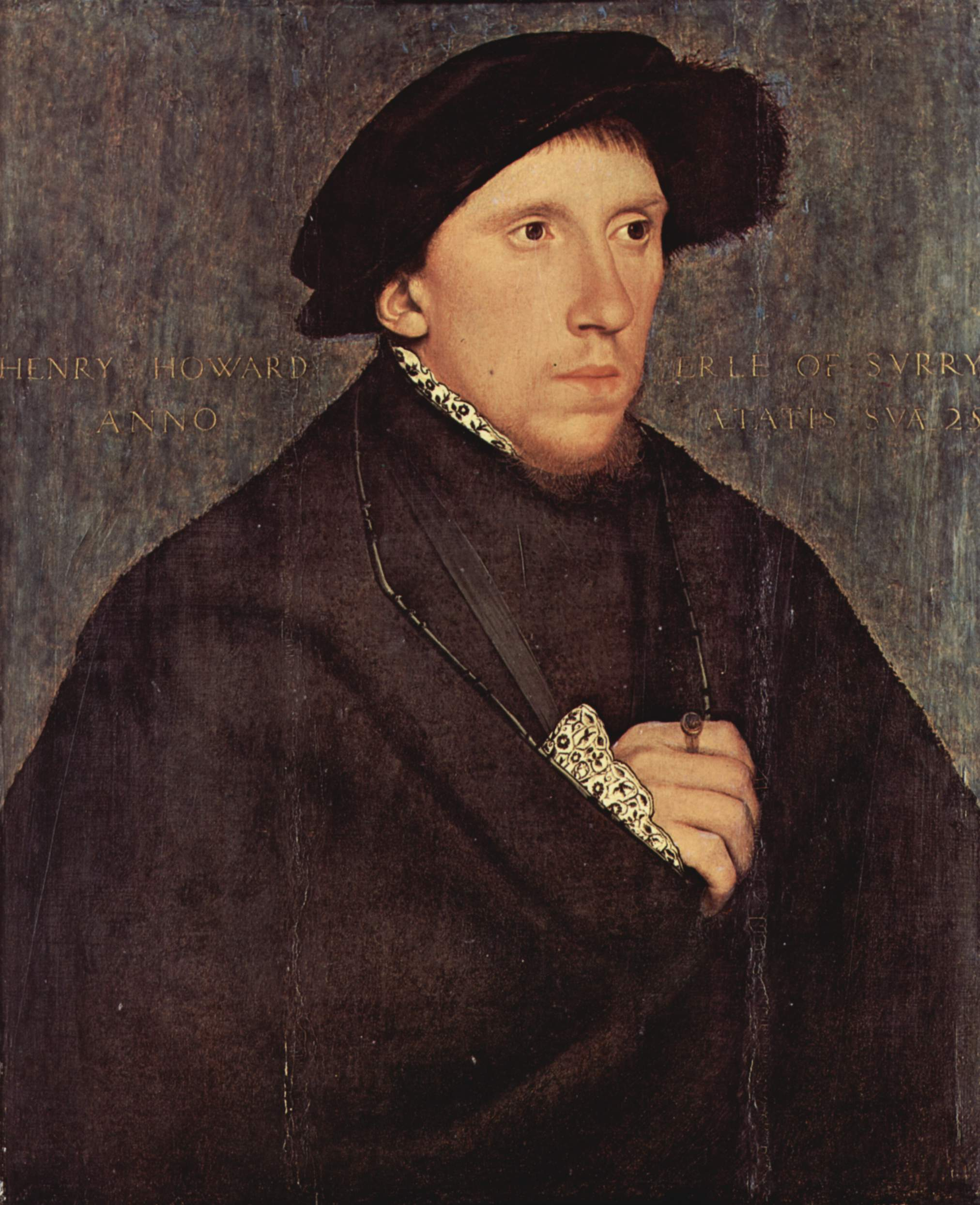
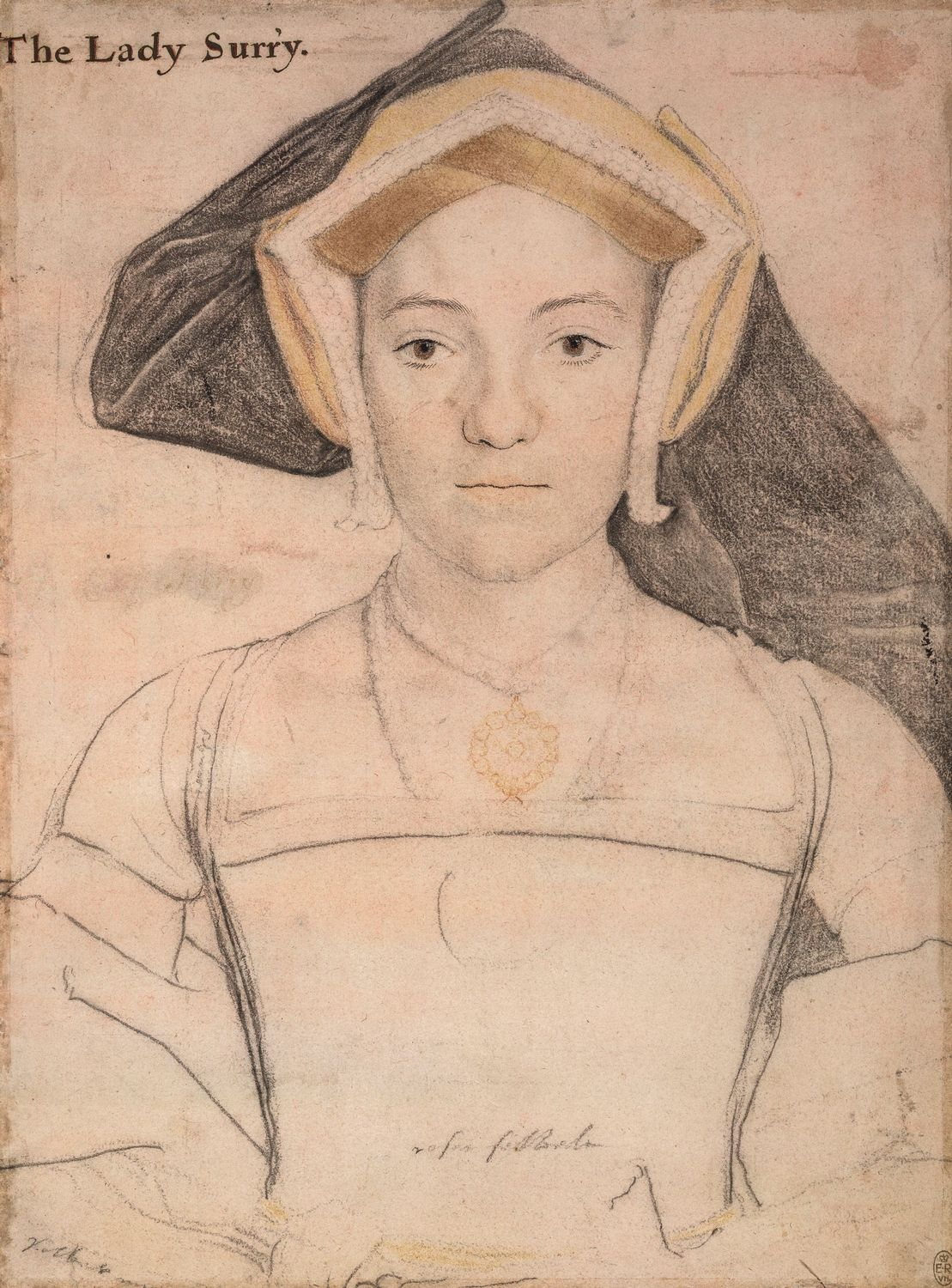
Henry Howard, Earl of Surrey and Frances de Vere, Thomas' parents
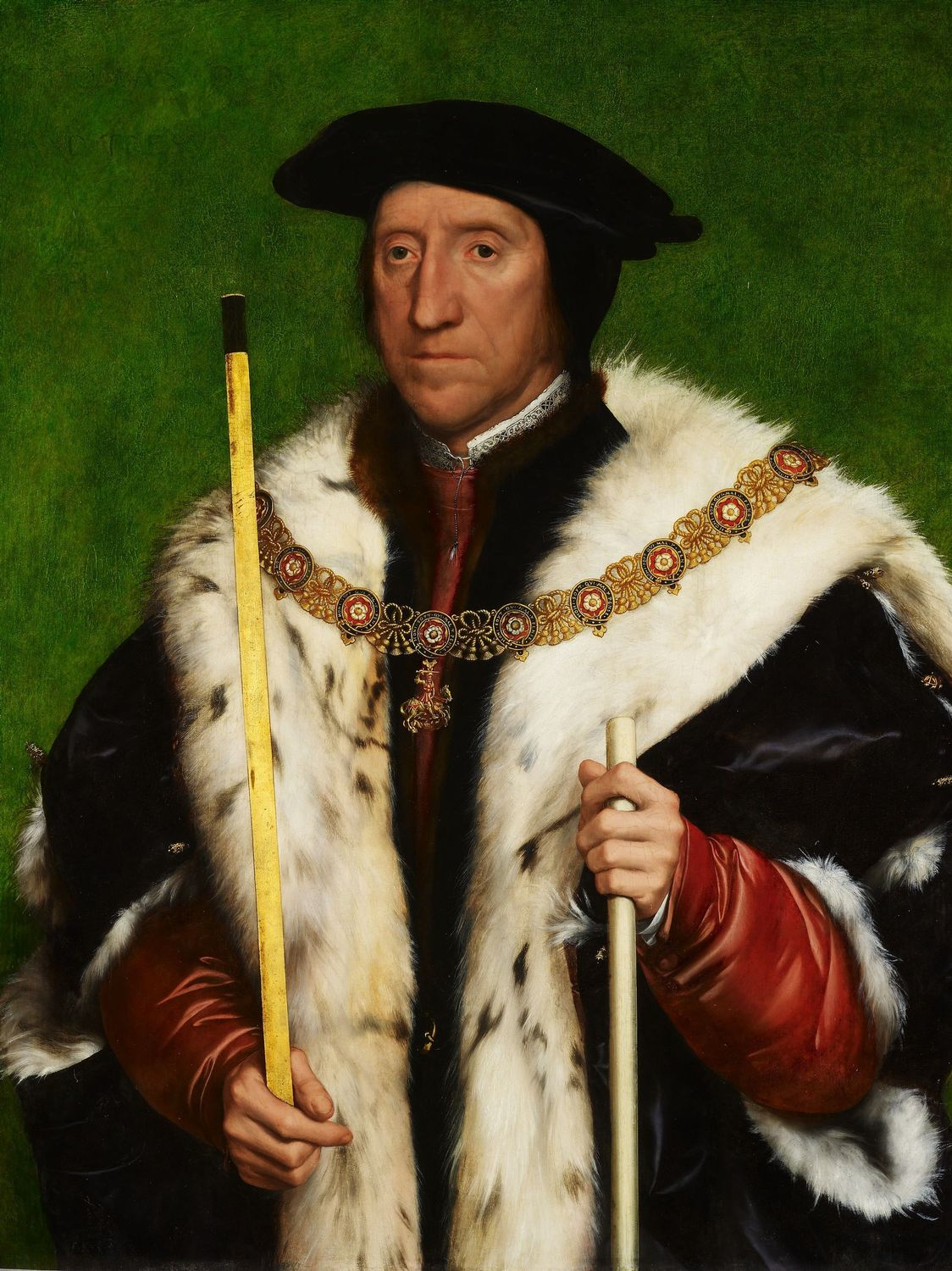
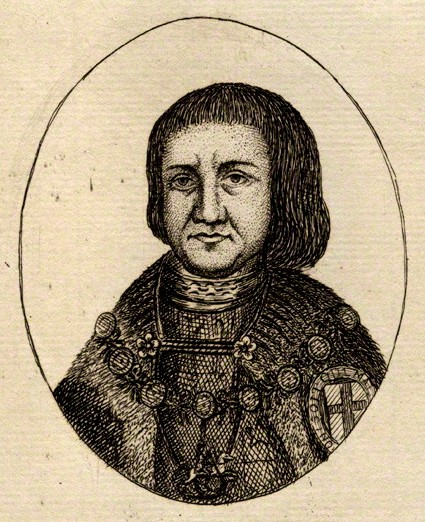
Thomas Howard, 3rd Duke of Norfolk and John de Vere, 15th Earl of Oxford, Thomas' paternal and maternal grandfathers

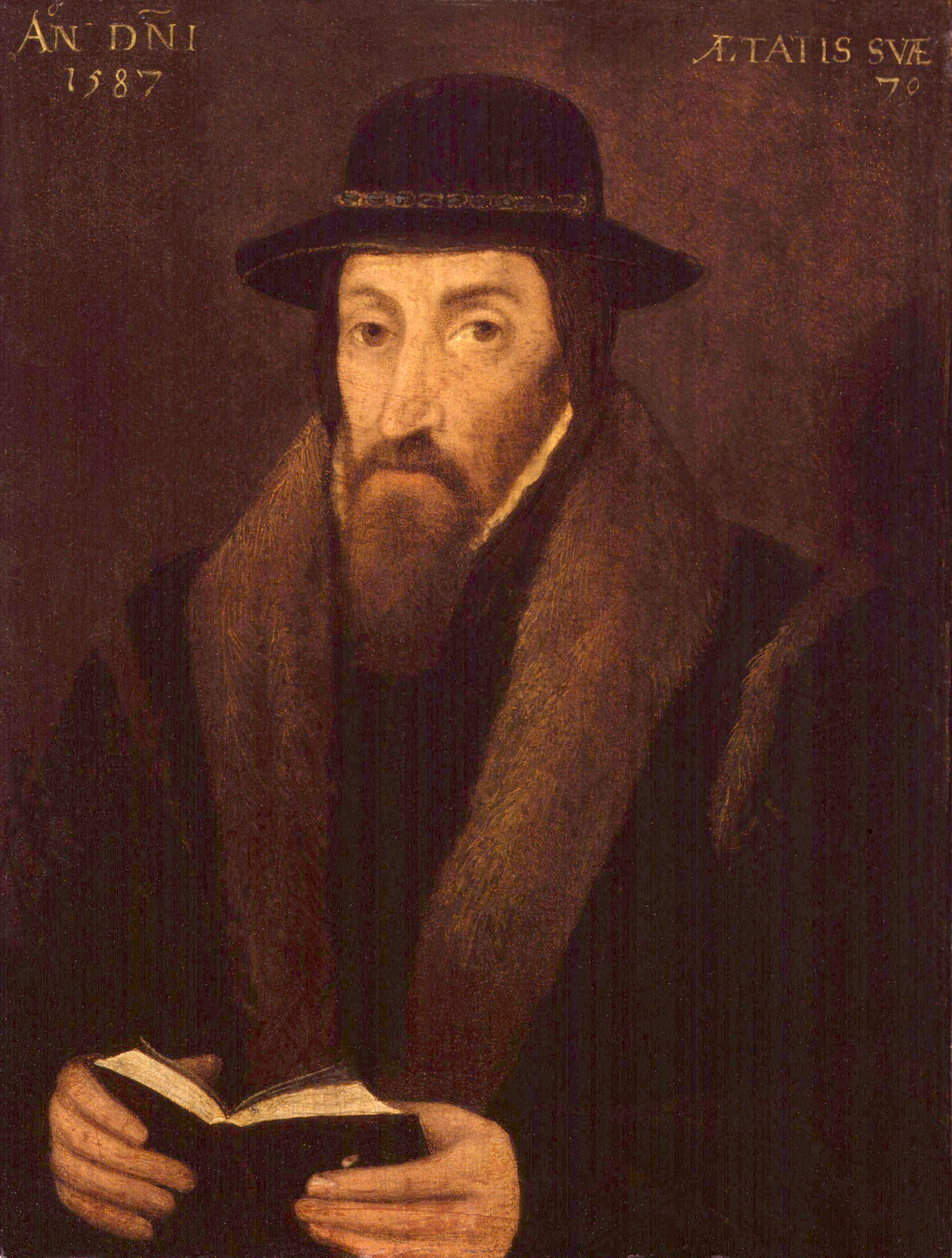
John Foxe. After educating Howard, the priest became a valued personal friend of the Duke, even though the Duke himself was a Catholic

Thomas was born on 10 March 1536 (although some sources cite his birth in 1538) at Kenninghall, Norfolk, being the first or second of five children of Henry Howard, Earl of Surrey, and his wife Lady Frances de Vere. His paternal grandparents were Thomas Howard, 3rd Duke of Norfolk, and Lady Elizabeth Stafford. His maternal grandparents were John de Vere, 15th Earl of Oxford, and Lady Elizabeth Trussell. His siblings were Jane born in 1533 or 1537, Henry born in 1540, Katherine born in 1543, and Margaret born in 1547, shortly after their father's execution. Between his maternal and paternal families, the religious differences were notable: his maternal grandfather was a supporter of the Reformation and was the first Protestant earl of Oxford, whereas his paternal grandfather was the premier Roman Catholic nobleman of England although he had complied with the changes in the governance of the Church of England brought about by Henry VIII, and served the King in suppressing rebellion against those changes.

Thomas' father, the Earl of Surrey, a Roman Catholic but with reformist leanings, was heir to the 3rd Duke, and thereby destined to become the future 4th Duke; but that changed at the end of 1546 when Surrey quartered the royal arms of Edward the Confessor on his own coat of arms, incurring the fury of Henry VIII. Through his great-grandfather John Howard, 1st Duke of Norfolk (1483 creation), Surrey was a descendant of Thomas of Brotherton, 1st Earl of Norfolk, the sixth son of King Edward I; and the arms of the Howard ancestor Thomas de Mowbray, 1st Duke of Norfolk (1397 creation), show that Surrey was entitled to bear Edward the Confessor's arms; but to do so was an act of pride, and provocative in the eyes of the Crown. Henry VIII was also possibly influenced by the Seymours, who were enemies of the Howard family, supporters of Protestantism and related to Henry's son Prince Edward, since the Prince was the son of Henry's third wife Jane Seymour. Henry, who was increasingly unwell, became convinced that Surrey and his father planned to usurp the crown from Edward in order to reverse the Reformation and return the English Church to papal jurisdiction. He ordered the arrest of the Duke and his son, both of them being tried for high treason and later sentenced to death; Surrey was executed on 19 January 1547. The Duke's execution was scheduled for 28 January but did not take place because Henry VIII died in the early hours of the same day, the Privy Council made a decision not to inaugurate the new reign with bloodshed, but Howard remained a prisoner in the Tower of London for the next six years, with most of his property and titles forfeit to the Crown.

Initially Surrey and his wife, Lady Frances, entrusted the education of their children to the Dutch physician and classical scholar Hadrianus Junius (the 3rd Duke and Surrey were patrons of the Dutchman), who was responsible for giving the Howard children a humanistic education, but after the fall In disgrace to his patron, Junius lost his job as the children's tutor. After Surrey's death, his sister Mary Howard, Dowager Duchess of Richmond, took over the care of his children and John Foxe, the Protestant martyrologist was employed to be their tutor, at the suggestion of Lord Wentworth. During that time, they lived in Reigate Castle, one of the residences belonging to the 3rd Duke. From Foxe, the children learned Greek and Latin to a level where they "could compete with the most learned men of the age". Charles Howard, a first cousin from Surrey born the same year as Thomas, also studied and brought up with the children at Reigate. Despite losing his position as tutor six years later, Foxe remained an important recipient of Thomas' patronage for the rest of Howard's life. Although both Thomas and his siblings received a Protestant education, they were Catholics, as were most of their paternal family, who remained loyal to the Roman Church during the turbulence of the Reformation. His father fell out of favour in part because he had been a Catholic, and his grandfather remained a prisoner in the Tower throughout the reign of Edward VI, being released and pardoned in July 1553, shortly after the Catholic Queen Mary I ascended the throne. As soon as the 3rd Duke was released, he took charge of his grandchildren and dismissed Foxe, who soon went into exile in various countries in Continental Europe to escape the anti-Protestant measures taken by Queen Mary. Thomas then studied for a while at the home of the Bishop of Winchester and later Lord Chancellor Stephen Gardiner. A short time later, he joined his brother Henry and continued his education at the London home of the Catholic Priest John White, who in March 1554 was elected Bishop of Lincoln.

== Career ==
Arms of Thomas Howard, when he just assumed the title of Duke of Norfolk

Duke of Norfolk's Restitution Act 1553
- Act of Parliament
- Parliament of England
- Long title: An act declaring the attainder of the duke of Norfolk.
- Citation: 1 Mar. Sess. 2. c. 13 Pr.
- Territorial extent: England and Wales

Dates
- Royal assent: 5 December 1553
- Commencement: 24 October 1553 (Note: Start of session.)
Other legislation
Repeals/revokes	Attainder of Duke of Norfolk and Earl of Surrey Act 1546
Relates to	Restitution in blood of Thomas Howard, Earl of Surrey.; Creation of Duke of Suffolk Act 1513

Status: Current legislation

[Creation of Earl of Surrey Act 1513 Text of statute as originally enacted]

Because his father had died before his grandfather, Thomas was now in line to become 4th Duke of Norfolk. In December 1553 he received the courtesy title of Earl of Surrey, a subsidiary title of the dukes, when Queen Mary approved the Duke of Norfolk's Restitution Act 1553 (1 Mar. Sess. 2. c. 13 Pr.), which declared void the attainder of the Howards, and returned to the 3rd Duke the titles and estates forfeited more than six years earlier. In early 1554, the new Earl of Surrey accompanied his grandfather in leading the forces that suppressed the Wyatt's Rebellion, led by a group of Protestant knights who opposed Queen's projected marriage to Philip II of Spain. This was the last service to the crown for the elderly 3rd Duke. In May of that same year, the manors of Gaywood and Rising were returned to Howard. In July, Thomas became first Gentleman of the Chamber to Philip.

Following his grandfather's death on 25 August 1554, Thomas succeeded him as 4th Duke and hereditary Earl Marshal of England. Howard had been preparing over the previous months to gradually take charge of the vast family inheritance received, although because he was still a minor at the time of his grandfather's death, guardianship of the new Duke was left in the hands of Queen Mary. Despite this, Howard was able to make some decisions such as organising his grandfather's funeral and burial in St Michael the Archangel's Church, Framlingham, and making the necessary arrangements for the guardianship of his sisters. Bassingbourne Gawdy, one of the lawyers in charge of the succession to Howard's estates, rode post haste to London with letters for Lord Chancellor Gardiner and returned as speedily as he could to Norwich. The escheator of Norfolk held a formal inquisition to survey the great Howard inheritance, of fifty-six manors, and 'many other considerable estates', which passed for the present into the hands of the Crown, until Thomas came of age. His younger siblings would also receive 1,000 marks each on coming of age, or marriage, according to the terms of their grandfather's will. Once he came of age in March 1557, Howard was able to administer all his estates, becoming one of the richest landowners in England.

In September 1554, Thomas arranged for the marriage of his sister Katherine to Henry Berkeley, 7th Baron Berkeley; this took place at Howard's mansion at Kenninghall.

Queen Mary died in November 1558 and was succeeded by her Protestant half-sister Elizabeth I. Howard was a second cousin of Elizabeth through her maternal grandmother, Lady Elizabeth Howard, sister of the 3rd Duke and mother of Anne Boleyn, and he was trusted with public office despite his family history and being Catholic.

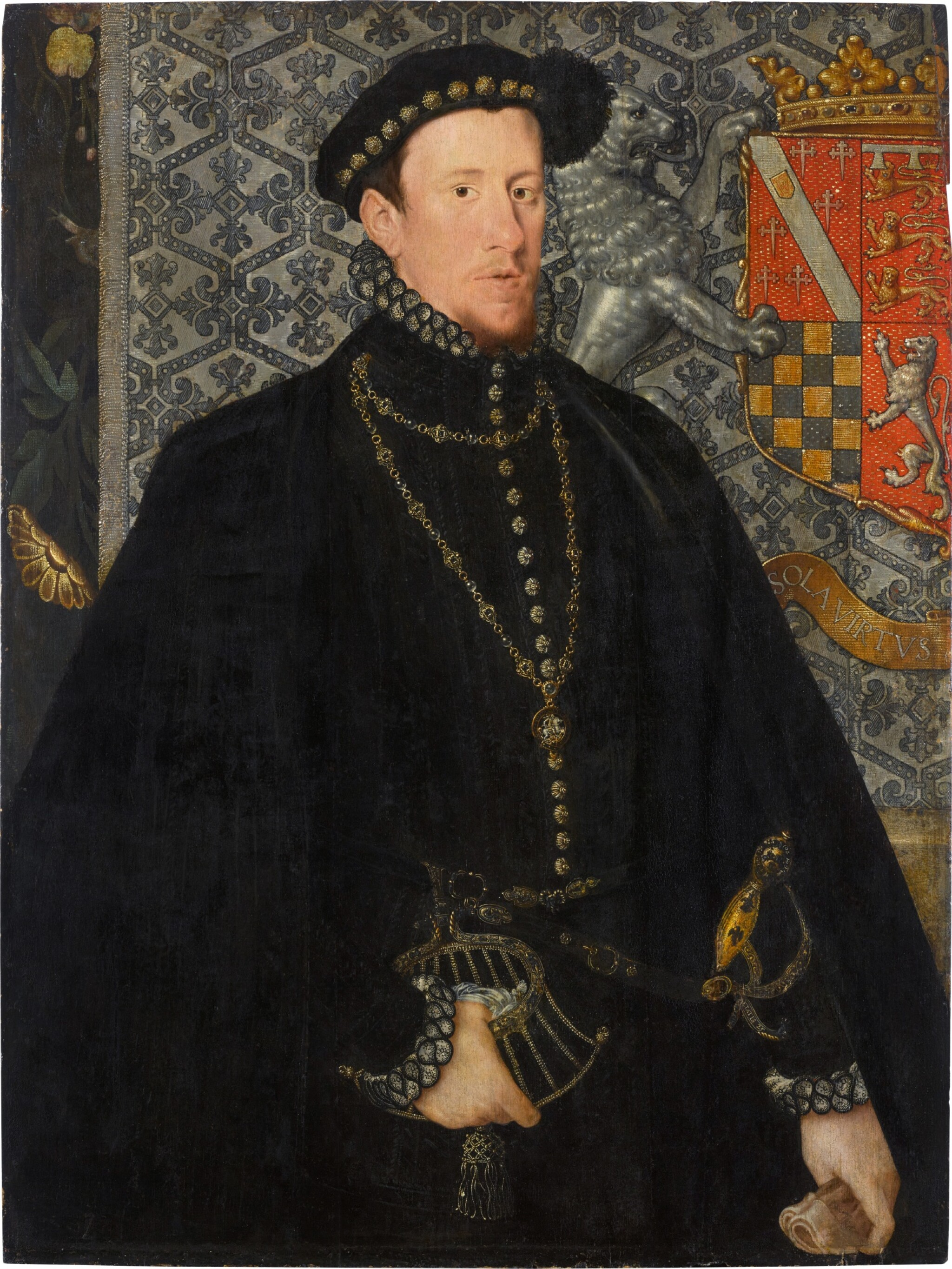
Thomas Howard, 4th Duke of Norfolk painted by Hans Eworth, C. 1562.

As Earl Marshal, Howard was in charge of organising Elizabeth's coronation on 15 January 1559 and the celebrations afterwards. Shortly after ascending the throne, the Queen made Norfolk a Knight of the Garter. Although favoured by Elizabeth, Norfolk was jealous of the greater measure of confidence she placed in Robert Dudley, Earl of Leicester. Furthermore, Howard considered William Cecil, Elizabeth's Secretary of State, to be "Low Born". In November 1559, Howard was appointed Lieutenant-General of the North, a position previously held by Henry Neville, 5th Earl of Westmorland, Norfolk's cousin, and which the Duke reluctantly accepted, probably seeing it as a means of distancing himself from the disputes he had with some members of the court. He was given command of the army that would intervene in Scotland to support the Lords of the Congregation, a group of Protestant nobles opposed to the pro-French government of the regent, Mary of Guise, mother of Mary, Queen of Scots, who was then living in France. By his side were placed a man of military experience, James Croft, and the diplomat and politician Sir Ralph Sadler, both with vast knowledge of Scottish political affairs. Howard immediately left for the north, arriving at Berwick in early January 1560. His duty was to provide forces for the defence of the town against a possible French attack, to open up communications with the leader of the Congregation, James Hamilton, Duke of Châtellerault and cautiously aid them in their measures against the regent. Norfolk was one of the negotiators of the Treaty of Berwick, signed in February 1560 and by which the Congregation invited English assistance, and was able to return to court after Cecil and his collaborators arrived in Edinburgh in July of the same year to sign the Treaty of Edinburgh which ended English assistance.

== Mary, Queen of Scots, and the Rising of the North ==
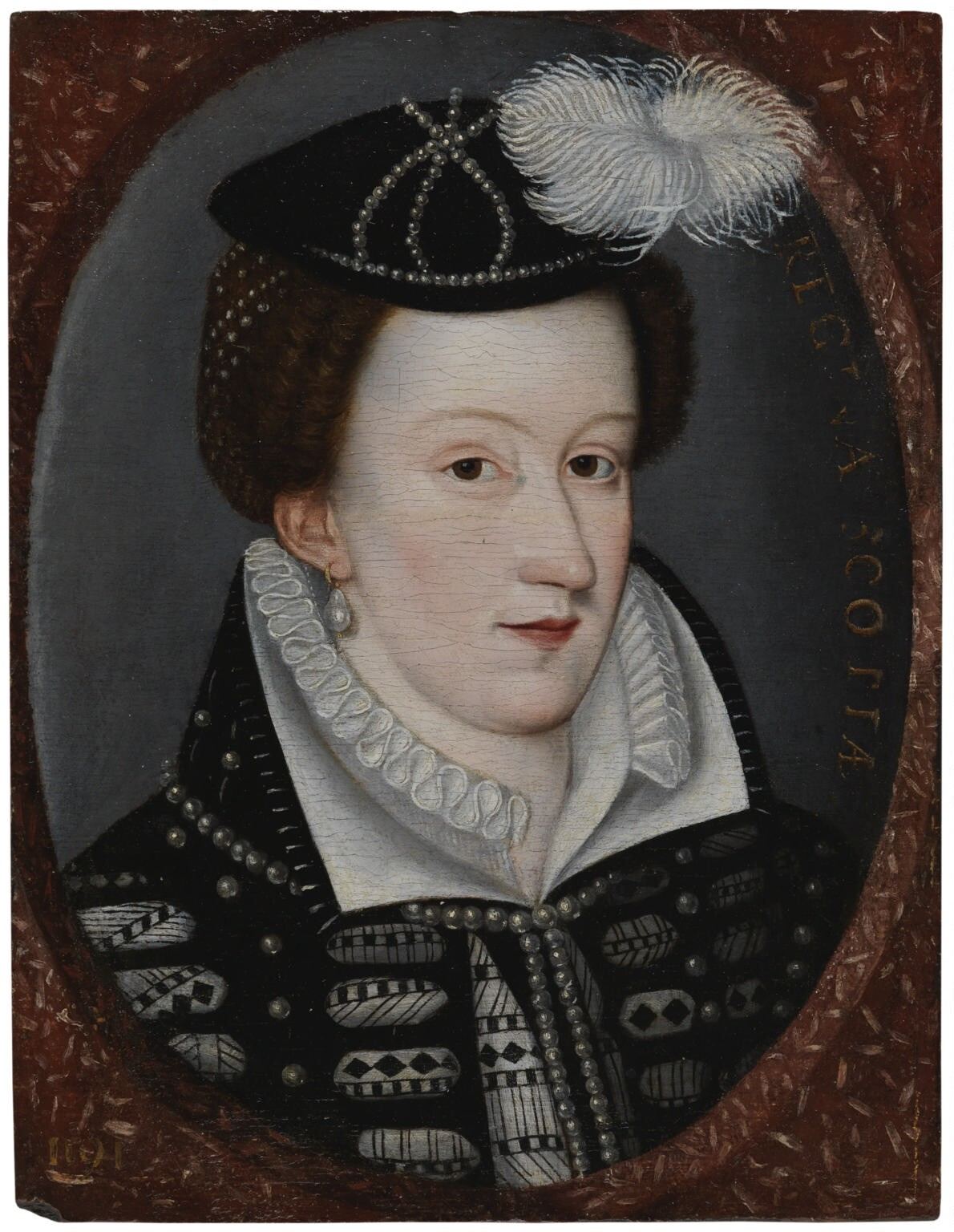
Mary, Queen of Scots. Norfolk's proposed marriage would have been the fourth for both of them

Norfolk was the principal commissioner at the conference held in York in October 1568 to hear evidence against Mary, Queen of Scots, who had been a prisoner in England since she fled Scotland after her defeat at the Battle of Langside and abdication under duress. The evidence was presented by Mary's illegitimate half-brother James Stewart, 1st Earl of Moray, who was also Scottish regent because Mary's son King James VI was still a young child. The evidence included the casket letters, which came to light during the investigations carried out in relation to Mary's alleged involvement in the murder of Lord Darnley.

Having recently lost his third wife, and despite having presided over the York commission, Norfolk began planning his marriage to Mary. For both parties, it would have been their fourth marriage; Howard had been widowed three times while Mary had been widowed twice and her third husband, James Hepburn, 4th Earl of Bothwell, had escaped to Continental Europe in search of support to try to restore his wife to the Scottish throne, but ended up a prisoner in Denmark. Both Howard and Mary were descended from the House of Plantagenet. Furthermore, the former Scottish monarch had a strong claim to the English crown as a descendant of Henry VII, the first monarch of the reigning Tudor dynasty, through her paternal grandmother Margaret Tudor and already considered herself the rightful queen of England, on the grounds that Elizabeth had been declared illegitimate following the annulment of the marriage of her parents, Henry VIII and Anne Boleyn in 1536. Most English Catholics also considered Elizabeth to be illegitimate, as her parents' marriage was never validated by the Holy See. Because the English monarch had no direct heirs, having never married, Mary's claim to the throne, who was Catholic, represented a serious threat to the continuity of the Protestant religious policies enacted by the Elizabethan government. Both the Scottish statesman William Maitland of Lethington and the Bishop of Ross, John Lesley, Mary's chief adviser and agent, were in favour of the Duke's marriage to the former Scottish queen, and Mary herself consented to it, and made steps to procure her own divorce or annulment.

Thomas Howard was initially reluctant to bring about political and religious change. At first he showed little sympathy for Mary, but during recesses from the conference in York, Maitland met privately with Norfolk, suggesting to the Duke the possibility of marrying Mary, as well as a possible future marriage between Howard's daughter, Margaret and the infant King James VI. Norfolk saw in this proposal not only the means to solve the succession crisis which had plagued England ever since Elizabeth's accession, given her reluctance to marry and produce an heir, but also an opportunity for his own social aggrandisement. Mary's marriage to the leading English nobleman would help the former Scottish monarch to strengthen her claim to the throne, and in 1569 might have helped enable her return to Scotland. If Mary, who shared the same religious beliefs as Norfolk (both were Catholics), married the Duke, she would not be able to marry a foreign prince, even if he was also Catholic.

In 1569, the plan for Mary to marry the Duke of Norfolk made some sense, and offered advantages for English policy if Mary was to return to Scotland. At the heart of its "commodity" was the observation that if Mary married the Duke, she would not be able to marry a foreign prince. Mary drafted proposals for the Parliament of Scotland. A commission for her divorce in 1569 prepared at Wingfield Manor in May 1569 stated that Bothwell's divorce from Jean Gordon was invalid, and there was a degree of affinity between Mary and Bothwell. The commission was witnessed by Lord Boyd, John Beaton, James Borthwick, Secretary Raulet, and James Boyd of Kippis. According to Laurence Banister, Norfolk's servant, Howard considered Mary's marriage to Bothwell was invalid, because Bothwell was still married to Jean Gordon.

However, Regent Moray was becoming lukewarm about Mary's return. In July 1569, Lord Boyd brought Mary's proposal or commission for a divorce to a meeting of the Scottish Privy Council and Estates at Perth. William Maitland of Lethington and James MacGill debated the issue, MacGill contended she should have no answer. The convention held a vote and decided by a large majority against pursuing the divorce.

Meanwhile, Queen Elizabeth seems to have been unaware of any plan for Mary and Norfolk to marry until as late as 9 September 1569, when Cecil wrote to William Drury at Berwick, describing her "vehemency" and ordering him to go to Scotland and speak with Moray about the project. Regent Moray met Henry Carey at Kelso in September 1569, and said that when he was at York and Hampton Court he had mentioned Mary's marriage as a possibility to Norfolk, if Bothwell was executed or Mary lawfully divorced. Moray said he had not made any further moves, but he knew that Mary's supporters were keen and a messenger called Thomas Flemming had spread exaggerated rumours. Hunsdon was then sent as a formal diplomat to Scotland to assure Moray that Elizabeth would not allow the marriage. Hunsdon was to discuss Mary's possible return if a number of Scottish aristocrats were held as hostages in England to guarantee her safety.

Norfolk and the former Scottish sovereign communicated through letters and presents. Mary sent Norfolk a gift of a pillow she had embroidered with the motto Virescit vulnere virtus (virtue flourishes from its wounds) with an image of knife cutting down a vine and her coat of arms. A surviving embroidery among the Oxburgh Hangings reproduces the emblem. The Duke, through Lord Boyd, sent Mary a diamond as a token of his affection and fidelity. Mary, grateful for the gift, wrote to Norfolk in December 1569 that "I took the diamant from my lord Boyd, which I shall kepe unseene about my neck till I give it agayn to the owner of it and me both." In November 1586, Mary sent Norfolk's diamond to the Spanish ambassador Bernardino de Mendoza, writing that it had been Norfolk's pledge of faith or troth to her (dont le seu duc de Norfolk m'obligea sa foi) and she had worn it always since.

A marriage to Mary would have given the Duke a political advantage at court, as he was by now a rival of Elizabeth's favourite, Dudley, and an enemy of Cecil. The marriage scheme was supported by most of the Catholic nobility, and some assumed that the Duke was willing to lead a revolt against Elizabeth. In November 1569 the Rising of the North broke out, organised by Charles Neville, 6th Earl of Westmorland, brother-in-law and also second cousin of Norfolk, and Thomas Percy, 7th Earl of Northumberland after they misinterpreted Norfolk’s sudden withdrawal from court as a sign that they should rebel. Howard briefly participated in the revolt, hoping that if he succeeded, he would achieve the release of Mary, who was then being held in Tutbury Castle. The rebels hoped to receive military aid from Spain, as well as possibly from France. It is still debated whether the rebellion actually aimed to overthrow Elizabeth, and whether Mary even knew about it beforehand. After initial successes, Westmorland and Northumberland retreated northward and finally dispersed their forces, fleeing into Scotland when Elizabeth sent an army under Thomas Radclyffe, 3rd Earl of Sussex, to quell the rebellion. Norfolk tried to stop the revolt when he saw that it was going to fail, but Elizabeth ordered his arrest after receiving news that the rising had taken place.

Norfolk was a prisoner in the Tower of London until August 1570 when he was released for lack of evidence, and also because he confessed his intentions and begged the Queen for mercy. Thomas' intention to marry Mary, although objectionable to Elizabeth, was not a sufficient reason to charge him with treason, and also at that time there was insufficient evidence against Howard since he was not directly involved in the revolt in the north.

== Involvement in the Ridolfi plot and execution ==
Shortly after Howard was released, Roberto Ridolfi, an Italian merchant and banker who lived in London at the time, contacted the Duke to negotiate his participation in the eponymous plot to free Mary, put her on the English throne and thus restore Catholicism in England. Ridolfi, a fervent Catholic who was also an agent of the Holy See, oversaw financing of the Rising of the North and had been plotting to overthrow Elizabeth since 1569, began preparing the Plot based on the Bull Regnans in Excelsis issued by Pope Pius V in February 1570, which excommunicated Elizabeth and urged Catholics to do all they could to depose her. The Spanish intelligence service was going to participate. Howard had already come into contact with Philip II of Spain regarding a proposed invasion of England with troops commanded by Fernando Alvarez de Toledo y Pimentel, 3rd Duke of Alba, who was based in the Spanish Netherlands.

Secret Vatican documents and Spanish General Archive of Simancas documents confirm that Howard was privately declared himself a Catholic to secure the support of the Pope and Philip II. Knowing that Pius V would not authorize another marriage between Mary and a Protestant (the Pope had already expressed his disapproval of the marriage between Mary and the Protestant Earl of Bothwell, even coming to the brink of excommunicating the Scottish Queen over the marriage), Ridolfi acted as an intermediary by personally traveling to Rome to present to Pius with letters and verbal assurances—authorized by Norfolk—stating that the Duke was a secret Catholic who had only conformed to the Church of England for political survival. The Pope, although remaining cautious because both Howard and Mary had already been married three times respectively, gave his approval to the marriage project and plot, seeing it as an opportunity to restore Catholicism in England if Elizabeth fell and the Duke and Mary ascended to the throne.

After some hesitation, Howard placed himself at the head of the conspirators; and in return for his services he asked the Spanish king "to approve of my own marriage with the Queen of Scots.“.

In March 1571, the Elizabethan government's intelligence network warned that a plot against the Queen's life was being prepared. By gaining the confidence of Spain's ambassador to England, John Hawkins learned the details of the conspiracy and notified the government so as to arrest the plotters. Elizabeth was also sent a private letter warning by Cosimo I de' Medici, Grand Duke of Tuscany, who had learned of the plot against her. Charles Baillie, Ridolfi's messenger, was arrested on c.12 April 1571 at Dover for carrying compromising letters, and by the use of torture and prison informers such as William Herle, he was forced to reveal the cipher of the messages he carried.

On 29 August, Norfolk's secretaries William Barker and Robert Higford entrusted to Thomas Browne, a Shrewsbury drapers merchant, what was purported to be a bag of silver coin for delivery to Laurence Bannister, one of Norfolk's officials in the north of England. Browne grew suspicious of the bag's weight, opened it, and discovered 600 pounds in gold from the French ambassador, destined for Scotland on Mary's behalf, and ciphered letters. Because he knew Norfolk was under suspicion, Browne reported his find to Cecil. Higford and Barker were interrogated, the letters were partly deciphered, and a search for the cipher key at Howard House uncovered a ciphered letter from Mary hidden under a doormat. Norfolk's servants were arrested and interrogated, and confessions were extracted from them by threats or application of torture. Sir Thomas Smith and Thomas Wilson were sent to confront Norfolk, who claimed the money was for his own private purposes. The deciphered letter, however, proved that he was lying. Unaware of his servants' confessions or the survival of letters which, contrary to his instructions, had not been burnt, he denied the charges against him. Norfolk was imprisoned in the Tower on 5 September.

Laurence Bannister testified on favour of Norfolk, clarifying that the Duke's brother, Henry, was the one who really intended to marry the former Scottish queen.

Norfolk initially denied all charges against him, but later admitted a degree of involvement in the transmission of money and correspondence to Mary's Scottish supporters and her participation in the Ridolfi plot. The evidence against Norfolk was now far stronger than it had been in 1569-70. It was clear that he still wanted to marry Mary, despite Elizabeth's objections. It was also clear that he had participated in a plot, supported by the Papacy, Spain, and possibly France, to overthrow and kill Elizabeth. At his trial on 16 January 1572, which lasted twelve hours, Norfolk pleaded his innocence. However, the jury of peers unanimously found him guilty of high treason, and he was sentenced to death.

After Norfolk had been sentenced, it was reasonable to suppose that his execution would quickly follow. It was rumoured that he was to be executed on 31 January, whereupon crowds flocked to the Tower. Elizabeth, torn between the demands of justice on the one hand and Norfolk's 'nearness of blood [and] ... his superiority of honour' on the other, did not sign the warrant until 9 February, and on the next day she countermanded her instructions. She did the same thing a fortnight later, to the dismay of Cecil (now ennobled as Lord Burghley) and the Privy Council. They insisted that Parliament be assembled to debate the threat posed by Norfolk and Mary, although Elizabethan parliaments normally met only every three or four years and the previous parliament had been dissolved only ten months earlier.

The new Parliament, the fourth of Elizabeth's reign, assembled on 8 May 1572. Over the course of the next three weeks Burghley and the Council used their spokesmen in the House of Commons to press the case for executing Norfolk. On 21 May, Leicester remarked that he could 'see no likelihood' that Norfolk would be executed. In late May, two Council members went so far as to observe that by failing to execute the Duke, the Queen was demonstrating that she believed the guilty verdict to be incorrect, which 'dishonoureth the nobles that have condemned him'. The Queen continued to resist re-signing the order, until her opinion suddenly changed when she encountered strong parliamentary pressure calling for the executions of both Norfolk and Mary. As Stephen Alford has observed, Norfolk's execution 'was the political price Elizabeth had to pay to save the Scottish Queen'. Even so, Elizabeth was determined that the decision to execute the Duke should be seen to be hers rather than Parliament's. On Saturday, 31 May, the Crown's spokesmen in the Commons persuaded the lower house, with great difficulty, to postpone petitioning the Queen to execute the Duke until the following Monday (2 June), 'in hope to hear news before that time'. The hint was well taken, as Norfolk finally went to the block less than one hour before the Commons reassembled.

During his last days, Howard was visited by his former tutor Foxe, who gave him for the purpose of consolation a version in Latin of his Book of Martyrs. Norfolk bequeathed to Foxe an annuity of £20 per year. The Duke also wrote to his mother's second husband, Thomas Steyning, asking that she be sent to the quiet of the countryside. Norfolk feared that if his mother was in London on the day of his execution, she might suffer health problems from shock.

At sunrise on 2 June 1572, Norfolk was led to a specially erected scaffold on Tower Hill, accompanied by Foxe and by Alexander Nowell, Dean of St Paul's. He addressed the crowd assembled to witness the execution. Despite admitting that he deserved to die, he declared himself to be partly innocent, whereupon he was interrupted by an official, who warned him that he should not try to clear himself, having been 'tried as honourably as any nobleman hath ever been in this land'. Urged to wind up quickly, as 'the hour is passed', Norfolk ended his speech by denying that he was a Catholic, as was commonly believed. After bidding a tearful farewell to Foxe and Nowell, and forgiving the executioner, the Duke removed his doublet and laid his head on the block. Howard said the final prayer "Lord into your hands I commend my spirit", the last words Jesus Christ said on the Cross before dying, according to the Gospel of Saint Luke, and then, before a silent crowd, which had been urged not to shout out to avoid 'frighting' his soul, the Duke's head was severed with a single stroke. Howard was between aged 34 or 36 at the time of his death.

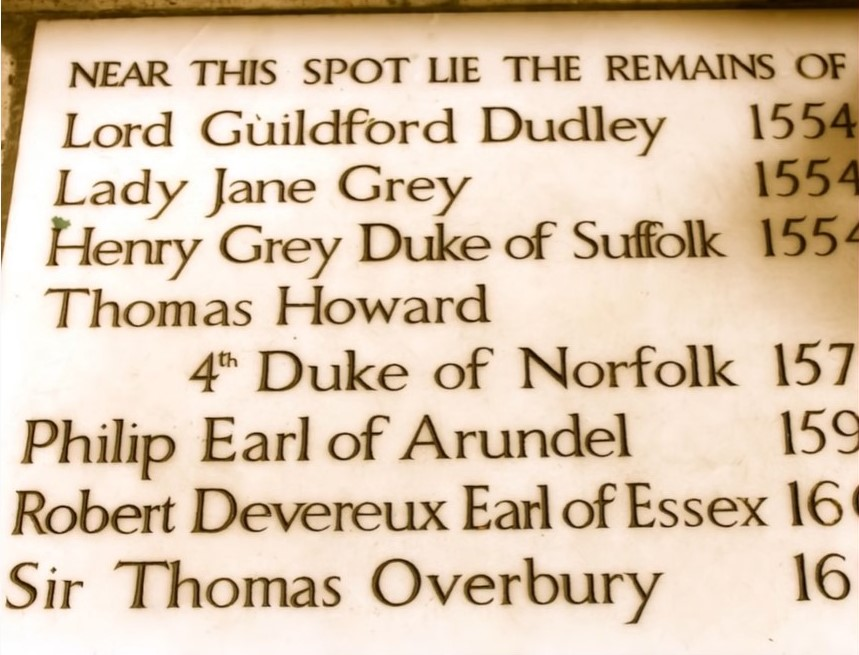
Plaque commemorating all those who were buried in the Chapel of St. Peter ad Vincula, including the 4th Duke of Norfolk.

Norfolk was the first nobleman to be executed during Elizabeth's reign, and was the first since Henry Grey, Duke of Suffolk, the father of Lady Jane Grey, was executed early in Mary I's reign. Equally striking was that he was the premier nobleman of England, the Queen's second cousin and a leading member of the Privy Council. Until recently, he had also been much admired by Elizabeth and Burghley. Indeed, in 1565 Cecil had described Norfolk as 'wise, just, modest, careful' and, despite his youth – he was then aged 27 or 29 – 'a father and stay to this country'. In the immediate aftermath of his execution, Elizabeth was reportedly 'somewhat sad' at the Duke's death. Norfolk was buried in Chapel of St. Peter ad Vincula, in the Tower of London.

Norfolk's lands and titles were forfeit, although much of his estate was later restored to his sons. The dukedom was restored, four generations later, to his great-great-grandson Thomas Howard.

Mary narrowly escaped execution on that occasion, but after being implicated in several subsequent Catholic plots, she finally fell from grace and was executed in February 1587.

== Marriages and issue ==
=== First wife ===
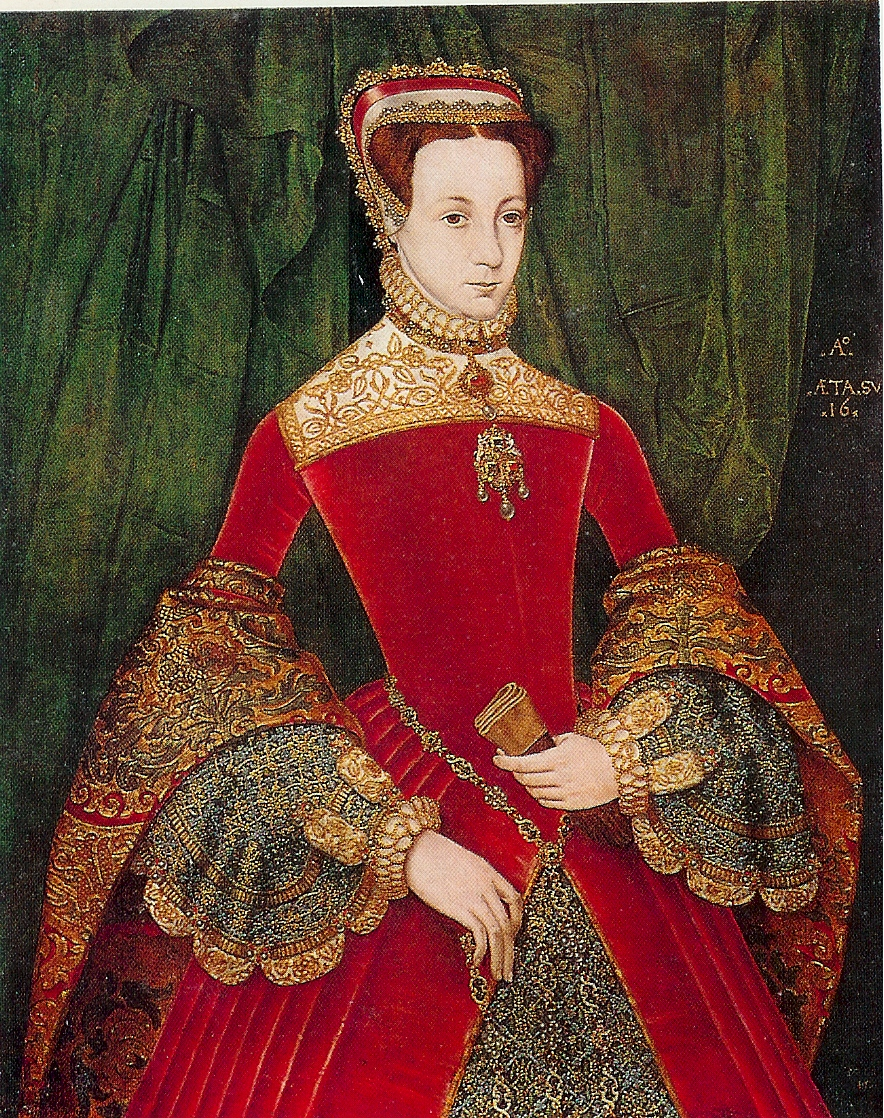
Lady Mary FitzAlan

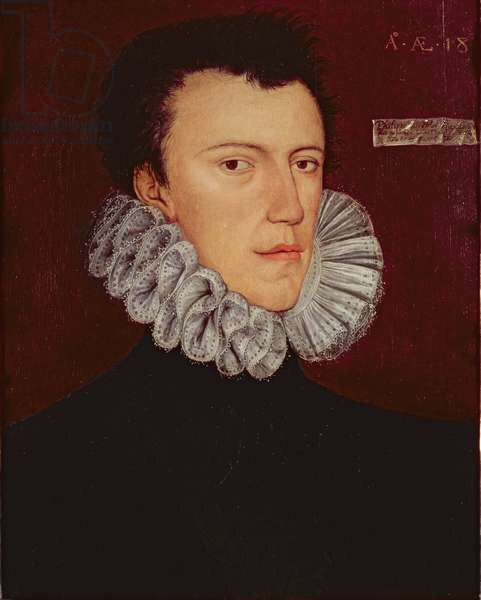
Philip Howard, only son of Norfolk and Mary FitzAlan

In March 1555, the Duke, then aged between 16 or 19, married his first wife, Lady Mary FitzAlan, who was aged 14 or 15. Lady Mary was the youngest daughter of Henry FitzAlan, 12th Earl of Arundel, by his first wife, Lady Katherine Grey. The marriage was arranged by the 3rd Duke in late 1553 with the aim of uniting the two most prominent Catholic families in England. Norfolk and Lady Mary were distantly related because through the lineages of their paternal grandparents, Howard was descended from Richard FitzAlan, 4th Earl of Arundel, and his father, the 3rd Earl of Arundel. Lady Mary was a direct descendant of both Earls of Arundel. They also shared ancestry from the House of Percy because Norfolk's paternal great-grandmother Eleanor Percy was the sister of Anne Percy, Lady Mary's paternal grandmother. Because the 4th Duke was still a minor and a ward of Queen Mary, Howard needed royal permission to marry Lady Mary FitzAlan. Lady Mary and her sister Jane became co-heirs to the Earldom of Arundel in 1556 after the death of their only brother, Henry, Lord Maltravers. Thomas's marriage to Mary brought as dowry many of the estates that Henry FitzAlan, Lady Mary's father, owned in Sussex, including Arundel Castle. Those FitzAlan properties were merged with Howard's properties in Norfolk. Mary became pregnant at the end of 1556, giving birth at Arundel House, Strand, London, on 28 June 1557, to what would be her only child:

- Philip Howard, Earl of Surrey (by courtesy) from 1557 to 1572. Following the death of his mother and years later his maternal aunt, Jane, Philip became sole heir to the Arundel earldom and all the FitzAlan family estates. After the death of his maternal grandfather in 1580, Philip became the 13th Earl of Arundel. For remaining loyal to Catholicism, he was imprisoned in the Tower of London in April 1585, remaining there until his death from natural causes in October 1595. Shortly after his death he was declared a Catholic martyr, and he was canonised in 1970 as one of the so-called Forty Martyrs of England and Wales. His tomb and shrine are in Arundel Cathedral.

It is from this marriage that Howard's descendants, the modern dukes of Norfolk, derive their surname of FitzAlan-Howard and their seat in Arundel.

The Duchess suffered serious health complications after the birth of Philip, possibly due to puerperal fever and died at Arundel House in August 1557. She was buried on 1 September 1557 in the Church of St Clement Danes, Temple Bar, London. Decades later, based on the provisions of the will of her grandson Thomas Howard, 14th Earl of Arundel, her remains were moved to the Fitzalan Chapel in Arundel. A spectacular tomb containing the funerary effigies of both Lady Mary and Margaret Audley, her first cousin and Norfolk's second wife, dressed in their peerage robes, was built a few years later in St Michael the Archangel's Church, Framlingham, Suffolk, but Lady Mary was never buried there.

=== Second wife ===
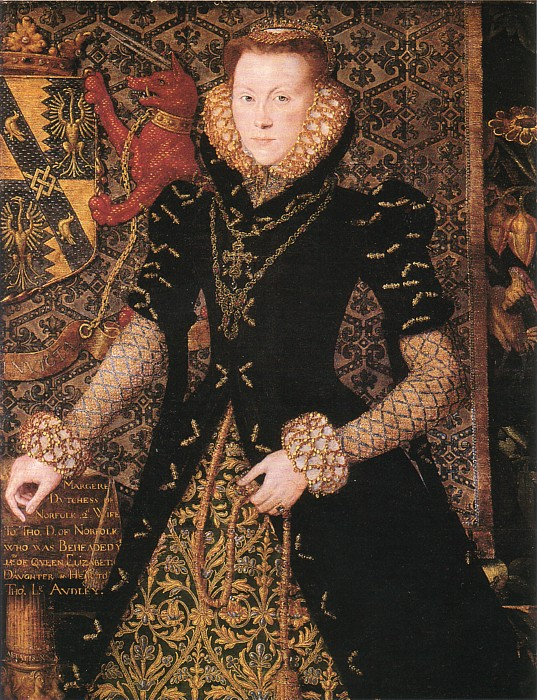
Margaret Audley

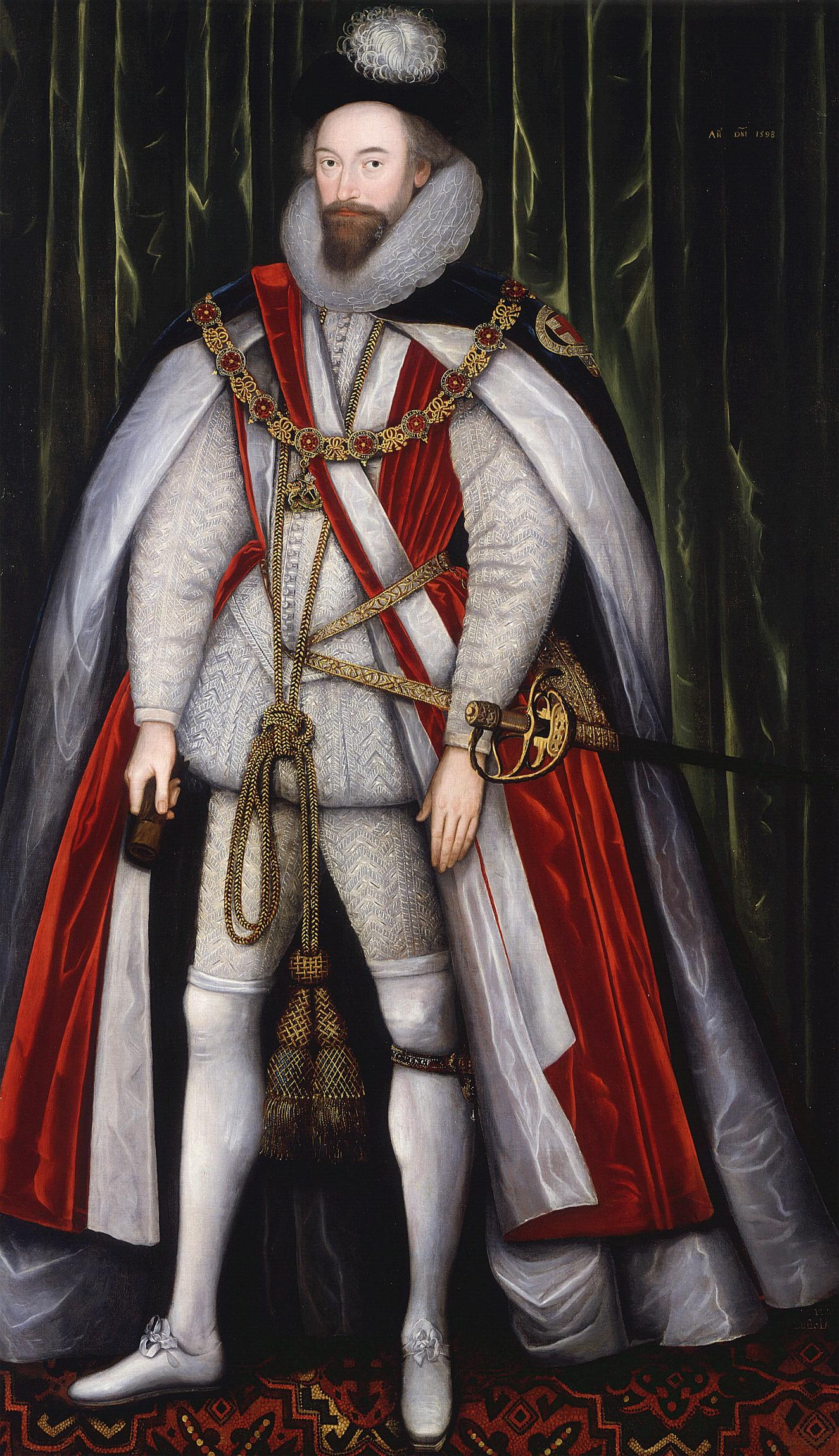
Thomas Howard, 1st Earl of Suffolk, son of Norfolk and Margaret Audley

In early 1558, Norfolk became betrothed to Margaret Audley, widow of Sir Henry Dudley and daughter of Thomas Audley, 1st Baron Audley of Walden, and his second wife Elizabeth Grey. Thus Margaret was a first cousin of Mary FitzAlan and in order for the marriage to be valid under Catholic canon law, a dispensation had to be requested from Pope Paul IV, due to the close relationship between Thomas' first wife and Audley. Howard sent lawyers to Rome to negotiate for the dispensation, but the Holy See was notorious for its delays where dispensations were concerned. These delays, added to the fact that in November of the same year Queen Mary died and was succeeded by Queen Elizabeth, who began to restore Protestantism, led to the marriage being celebrated without the dispensation. It was ratified by Parliament in March 1559. Margaret brought as dowry to her marriage with Howard the entirety of the extensive properties that she had inherited from her father in Essex, including the magnificent Audley End residence.

Norfolk's children by his marriage to Margaret were:

- Lady Elizabeth Howard (1560–?), who died in early childhood. She was buried in St Michael the Archangel's Church, Framlingham.
- Thomas Howard, 1st Earl of Suffolk (1561–1626), who firstly married his step-sister, Mary Dacre, without issue. He married secondly Katherine Knyvet c. 1583 and had issue.
- Lady Margaret Howard (1562–1591), who married Robert Sackville, 2nd Earl of Dorset, and had issue.
- Lord William Howard of Naworth Castle and Henderskelfe Castle (now the site of Castle Howard) (1563–1640), who married his step-sister Elizabeth Dacre and had issue. The Earls of Carlisle are direct descendants of Lord William.

At Christmas 1563, Margaret, anxious to be reunited with her husband, left Audley End, despite being still weak from the birth of her fourth child a few days before. During the journey she fell ill with a respiratory condition that worsened as the days passed, and she died in Norwich on 9 January 1564. The Duchess was buried in the first instance in St. John the Baptist's Church in Norwich, although shortly afterwards her remains were moved to St Michael the Archangel's Church, Framlingham, where her tomb is located, richly decorated with heraldic quarters and her funerary effigy, which is displayed with the peerage robes.

=== Third wife ===
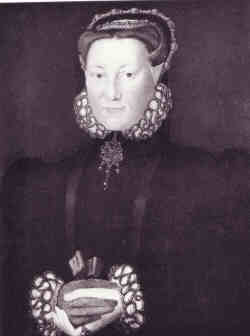
Portrait of Elizabeth Leyburne attributed to Hans Eworth, c. 1560

Shortly after Margaret's death, Norfolk married Elizabeth Leyburne (1536 – 4 September 1567), widow of Thomas Dacre, 4th Baron Dacre of Gillesland, and daughter of Sir James Leyburn. They had no living children.

Norfolk's three sons by his first two wives, Philip, Thomas and William, married, respectively, Anne, Mary, and Elizabeth Dacre. The Dacre sisters were the daughters of Elizabeth Leyburne by her marriage to Thomas Dacre and were therefore stepsisters to Norfolk's sons.

Elizabeth died in September 1567, shortly after giving birth to a baby, whose sex is not known and who also died. She was buried at St. Mary's Church, Kenninghall.

== Family tree ==
Through his maternal and paternal lineages, Howard was related to the most important families of the English and Welsh nobility. Through his ancestor Jacquetta of Luxembourg, he was related to the House of Luxembourg, descended from Italian nobility (Orsini family) and from French nobility. Through his maternal great-great-grandfather, Sir John Donne, Howard was a descendant of Owain Glyndŵr, the last native prince of Wales.

== Depictions ==
- Thomas Howard appears as a character in the Philippa Gregory novels The Virgin's Lover and The Other Queen, and in the novel I, Elizabeth by Rosalind Miles.
- A villainized version of the Duke, played by Christopher Eccleston, is in the 1998 film Elizabeth.
- Another version of the Duke is in the BBC mini-series The Virgin Queen, played by Kevin McKidd.
- In the Channel 4 documentary Elizabeth (2000) presented by David Starkey, the Duke is portrayed by actor John Gully.

Ancestors of Thomas Howard, 4th Duke of Norfolk

8. Thomas Howard, 2nd Duke of Norfolk
4. Thomas Howard, 3rd Duke of Norfolk
9. Elizabeth Tilney, Countess of Surrey
2. Henry Howard, Earl of Surrey
10. Edward Stafford, 3rd Duke of Buckingham
5. Elizabeth Stafford
11. Eleanor Percy
1. Thomas Howard, 4th Duke of Norfolk
12. John de Vere
6. John de Vere, 15th Earl of Oxford
13. Alice Kirlington
3. Frances de Vere
14. Edward Trussell
7. Elizabeth Trussell
15. Margaret Donne

== Notes ==
Political offices
Preceded by The Duke of Norfolk	Earl Marshal; 1554–1572	Succeeded by The Earl of Shrewsbury
Preceded by The Earl of Sussex	Lord Lieutenant of Norfolk; 1559–1572	Succeeded by Unknown
Peerage of England
Preceded by Thomas Howard	Duke of Norfolk; 3rd creation 1554–1572	Vacant Title next held by Thomas Howard
Preceded by Thomas Howard	Earl of Surrey; 3rd creation 1554–1572	Vacant Title next held by Thomas Howard
Preceded by Thomas Howard	Baron Mowbray; 1554–1572	Succeeded by Philip Howard
