= Martin Felton =

New Zealand footballer

Personal information
- Full name: Martin D Felton
- Place of birth: New Zealand
- Position: Defender

Senior career*
Years	Team	Apps	(Gls)
- Papatoetoe

International career
1984	New Zealand	2	(0)
- * Club domestic league appearances and goals

Martin Felton is a former association football player who represented New Zealand at international level.

Felton played two official A-international matches for the New Zealand in 1984, both against Pacific minnows Fiji, the first a 2–1 win on 18 October, the second two days later a 1–1 draw on 20 October 1984.
