= Guerau de Espés =

Spanish nobleman and diplomat

Ambassador of the King of Spain to the Queen of England
- In office 1568–1571

Personal details
- Born: Guerau de Espés del Valle; 1524 Lleida, Principality of Catalonia, Crown of Aragon
- Died: 1572 (aged 47–48)
- Occupation: Diplomat

Guerau de Espés del Valle (1524 in Lleida – 1572) was a Spanish nobleman and diplomat. He served as Philip II of Spain's ambassador to Elizabeth I's England from 1568 to 1571 during one of the tensest moments in Anglo-Spanish relations and was expelled after being accused of complicity of the Ridolfi plot. He was a knight of the Order of Calatrava. He also appeared as a character in the 2007 film Elizabeth: The Golden Age, played by the British actor Will Houston. English sources call him "Guerau de Spes".

== Career ==
John Man, English ambassador in Madrid, had called the pope a sanctimonious little monk and so Philip II replaced the priest Diego de Silva y Guzmán with Espés as ambassador to England. Due to his hostility to the English, Espés described William Cecil, 1st Baron Burghley, one of the most powerful and influential noblemen in England at that time, to Philip II as

a common man, although very clever, false, lying, a great heretic and foolish enough to believe that not all the princes of Christendom combined were in a position to violate his country's sovereignty.

In the Spanish Netherlands the Geuzens' Revolt began and in November 1568 the royal treasury in Seville sent five ships with 40,000 pounds of gold, with which Fernando Álvarez de Toledo, Duke of Alba was to raise troops in the Netherlands to quell the revolt. These ships were attacked by Huguenot privateers and sought protection in British waters. Espés told Elizabeth that the gold belonged to Philip's bankers and was being sent to Antwerp and asked that Elizabeth protect the ships. She agreed and most of the ships anchored in English ports. However, news then reached Elizabeth of a Spanish attack on the British ships at San Juan de Ulúa in Mexico and in reprisal ordered that the Spanish ships be confiscated and their gold moved to the Tower of London. On Espés's advice, Alva then seized the goods of English merchant ships anchored at Antwerp.

=== Mary, Queen of Scots ===
Espés heard reports from the household of Mary, Queen of Scots, who was held in England at Bolton Castle and Tutbury Castle. Espés heard from Leonard Dacre about plans for the Queen of Scots to marry Thomas Howard, 4th Duke of Norfolk and to remove William Cecil from government. Espés was not enthusiastic because the Earl was not a Catholic. In January 1569, he understood that Mary easily gained friends and allies, and she was confident that if she could be freed would become Queen of England.

=== John Hawkins ===
In a letter dated 14 February 1569, Espés wrote that John Hawkins had come to London with four horses loaded with gold and silver from the Indies (meaning Florida). Hawkins said that he left 240 men to found a colony in Florida in lieu of that lost at San Juan de Ulúa. Espés commented that the treasure would hardly cover the cost of his voyages. Espés wrote to Philip II of Spain on 11 September 1570 that Hawkins had given him his promise not to sail to the Indies again, but was making preparations to molest Spanish ships from La Rochelle.

=== The Neptune jewel ===
He described a New Year's Day gift presented by the Earl of Leicester to Elizabeth in January 1571. The gift was a jewel with an enamelled scene showing Elizabeth enthroned and Mary, Queen of Scots, in chains. Neptune bowed to Elizabeth. For Espés, this device was typical of English boasting and bravado and was a warning for caution and the need to take advantage of opportunity and artifice for the preservation of Spanish power.

=== Expelled from England ===
Espés was finally expelled from England in December 1571 for his alleged complicity in the Ridolfi plot. Elizabeth wrote to the Duke of Alba that Espés was such a person as "would secretly seek to enflame the realm with firebrands".
