= John Felton (canoeist) =

Australian slalom canoeist

John Felton (born 5 December 1960 in Kyogle) is an Australian slalom canoeist who competed from the late 1970s to the mid-1990s. He finished 14th in the C-2 event at the 1996 Summer Olympics.

John Felton commenced canoeing in 1974, he subsequently competed internationally from 1979 – 1983 when he retired having won a Commonwealth Title (Scotland, 1981) and having finished as high as 4th in the World Championships (Jonquiere, Canada 1979). After Canoe Slalom was readmitted to the Olympic Games in 1992 he came out of retirement in 1993 (at 32 years of age) and teamed up again with Andrew Wilson for a shot at the Atlanta Olympic Games. After qualifying for the Games and 4 weeks before the start, he broke 2 ribs in a training accident in Augsburg, Germany (the site of the 1972 Olympics). They went on to finish 14th at the 1996 Olympics.

After these Games, the then Minister for the Olympics – Michael Knight threw the sport of canoe slalom out of the Olympic Games. The International Canoe Federation approached Felton to head the project to have canoe slalom readmitted to the Olympic Program. Felton was successful and in August 1997 slalom was readmitted. Felton is credited along with Australian engineer Peter Heeley and 5 time World slalom Champion Richard Fox as the inventors of the world's first totally artificial, pumped whitewater course. Felton oversaw the construction of the facility as the ICF whitewater specialist and was subsequently appointed to the position of Competition Manager for the 2000 Olympic Games.

Subsequently, he has consulted on many artificial whitewater courses throughout the world, spoken on sustainability and ensuring legacy at a number of outdoor and sports conferences and is the Design Director with his company the USA based Whitewater Parks International.

Felton has been the lead designer for numerous projects in almost every continent including the 2012 London Olympic Whitewater Venue (Broxbourne), the Rio de Janeiro 2016 whitewater facility (Deodoro), the Tokyo 2020 Whitewater Stadium (Kasai Rinkai Park) and ground breaking facilities like the Vector Wero Whitewater Park in Auckland New Zealand and Xavage whitewater for Xcaret Amusement Parks in Cancun Mexico.
