= Teddy Felton =

English footballer

Personal information
- Full name: Edward Taylor Felton
- Date of birth: 12 November 1907
- Place of birth: Gateshead, England
- Date of death: 1970 (aged 62–63)
- Position: Forward

Senior career*
Years	Team	Apps	(Gls)
1931–1933	Carlisle United	20	(3)
1933	Darlington	0	(0)
1933–1936	Wigan Athletic	113	(75)
1936–1937	Huddersfield Town	0	(0)
1937–1938	Gateshead	4	(1)
- * Club domestic league appearances and goals

Edward Taylor Felton (born 12 November 1907; died 1970) was an English footballer who played for Carlisle United, Darlington, Wigan Athletic, Huddersfield Town and Gateshead.

== Career ==
Felton joined Wigan Athletic in 1933. He finished his first season at the club as top scorer, with 36 goals in all competitions. He scored 75 times in 113 Cheshire League appearances before joining Huddersfield Town during the 1935–36 season.
