= John Felton (divine) =

John Felton (fl. 1430) was an English academic and churchman.

Felton was fellow of St. Mary Magdalen College, Oxford, and professor of theology, and 'vicarius Magdalensis Oxonii extra muros.’ His zeal as a preacher gained him the name of ‘homiliarius’ or ‘concionator;’ for though, as Leland tells us, he was ‘an eager student of philosophy and theology,’ yet ‘the mark towards which he earnestly pressed with eye and mind was none other than that by his continual exhortations he might lead the dwellers on the Isis from the filth of their vices to the purity of virtue.’ He published several volumes of sermons, compiled from various sources, which are prefaced by the statement that the ‘penuria studentium’ had moved him to make this compilation ‘de micis quas collegi quæ cadebant de mensis dominorum meorum, Januensis, Parisiensis, Lugdunensis, Odonis, et cæterorum.’

He left behind him: 1. ‘Alphabetum theologicum ex opusculis Rob. Grost. collectum.’ 2. ‘Sermones Dominicales’ (fifty-eight in number; there are three copies among the Harleian MSS in the British Library, one of which contains a note stating that the sermons were finished in 1431). 3. Two other volumes of ‘Sermones.’ 4. ‘Lecturæ sacræ Scripturæ.’ 5. ‘Pera Peregrini.’ A note on the margin of one of his works declares that in 1420 he made a present of books to Balliol College.
