= William Herle (spy) =

English pirate, spy and informer

William Herle (died 1589) was an Englishman who was both a Member of Parliament and the county sheriff; he was also a privateer and spy while imprisoned in the Marshalsea prison in 1571. He became known for his part in Elizabeth I's intelligence network inside the jail. He smuggled letters from William Cecil, Lord Burghley, about people involved in the so-called Ridolfi plot, which was a Roman Catholic plan to assassinate the Queen and replace her with Mary, Queen of Scots.

== Privateering ==
Herle was hired by Sir William Garrard in 1565. Garrard was the Lord Mayor of London and had a market in the northern sea. This brought Herle to the attention of William Cecil, who hired him in the mid-1560s to travel and supply the allies in England. Herle was sent to raid ships on the River Thames. Eventually, Margaret, Duchess of Parma, a Spanish regent in the Netherlands, asked Elizabeth I to stop Herle.

In July 1566, Herle turned himself in to Cecil to be imprisoned and questioned for his pirating. During the trial in July 1566, he was acquitted for his absence on the ship Tigger when the raid happened.

== Imprisonment ==
Herle was placed in prison due to his crimes as a pirate. Herle would have gotten the death penalty for being a pirate, but often managed to escape through a loophole where he stayed in jail and wrote about his experiences. Herle wrote in his journal to Cecil about Herle and the other prisoners' lives. His writings have helped to understand Tudor jail life.

In 1571, he wrote to Cecil several times about the Ridolfi Plot. He also wrote to William Cecil about Mary I of Scotland's guest, and was able to obtain letters to Cecil that proved there was a plot against Elizabeth I.
