= Thomas Felton (martyr) =

English Roman Catholic priest and martyr

Blessed Thomas Felton O.M.
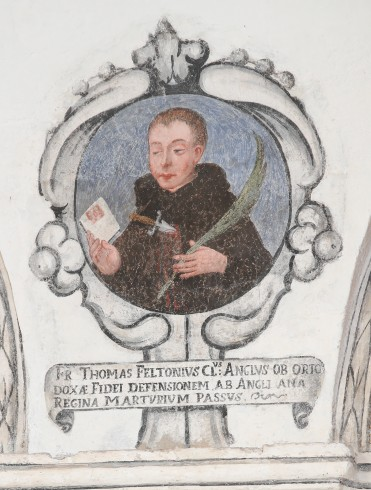
- Fresco of Blessed Thomas Felton by Greco Bernardino within a church in the Diocese of Conversano - Monopoli

Martyr
- Born: c. 1566 or 1567; Bermondsey Abbey, Surrey, England
- Died: 28 August 1588 (aged 20 - 22) between Brentford and Hounslow
- Honored in: Roman Catholic Church
- Beatified: 15 December 1929 by Pope Pius XI
- Feast: 28 August
- Attributes: knife in chest, holding a note, martyr's palm, Franciscan Minim habit, noose in neck, crown of martyrdom

Thomas Felton (1566?–1588) was a Franciscan Minim, a Roman Catholic martyr and son of the Roman Catholic martyr, John Felton.

Felton was born around 1566 at Bermondsey Abbey, Surrey, and was about four years old when his father was executed. When still young, he served as a page to Lady Lovett. He was then sent to the English College, Rheims, where he received the first tonsure from the hands of the Cardinal de Guise, archbishop of Rheims, in 1583. He then entered the order of Minims, but its austerities undermined his health and he returned to England, to settle his property and make provision for his profession.

Attempting to return to France, Felton was arrested on the coast, brought to London, and committed to the Poultry Compter. About two years later his aunt, Mrs. Blount, obtained his release through the interest of some of her friends at court. He attempted to return to France, but was again intercepted and committed to Bridewell prison. After some time he regained his liberty, and made a second attempt to get back to Rheims, but was rearrested and recommitted to Bridewell, where he was put into Little Ease and otherwise tortured.

He was brought to trial at Newgate, just after the defeat of the Spanish Armada, and was asked whether, if the Spanish forces had landed, he would have taken the part of Queen Elizabeth. His reply was that he would have taken part with God and his country. But he refused to acknowledge the queen to be the Supreme Head of the Church of England, and was accordingly condemned to death. The next day, 28 August 1588, he and another priest, named James Claxton (or Clarkson), were conveyed on horseback from Bridewell to the place of execution, between Brentford and Hounslow, and were there hanged and quartered.

== James Claxton ==
James Claxton was from Yorkshire. He went to the English College at Douai, which had relocated temporarily to Rheims, and was ordained at Soissons 9 June 1582. He set out for England with fellow-priest Richard Evens on 24 July. At some point he was captured and exiled in 1585. He returned to England, was again arrested and sent to the Marshalsea prison. On 28 August 1588, he was taken with Thomas Felton to a place near Brentford, (likely "Bush Corner") and hanged. All told eight were executed on this day in and around London.
