= John Felton (American football) =

American football coach

Biographical details
- Born: December 24, 1883; Bedford County, Pennsylvania, U.S.
- Died: February 7, 1961 (aged 77); Bedford County, Pennsylvania, U.S.
- Education: Dickinson (1912)

Coaching career (HC unless noted)
- 1912–1913: West Virginia Wesleyan
- 1914: Western Maryland
- 1916: Muskingum
- 1921: West Virginia Wesleyan

Head coaching record
- Overall: 19–23

John Lincoln Felton (December 24, 1883 – February 7, 1961) was an American college football coach. He served two stints as the head football coach at West Virginia Wesleyan College in Buckhannon, West Virginia from 1912 to 1913, as co-head coach with Mont McIntire, and in 1921. Felton was also the head football coach at McDaniel College (then known as Western Maryland College) in 1914 and at Muskingum College in Ohio in 1916. He was a graduate of Dickinson College in Carlisle, Pennsylvania.

== Head coaching record ==
Year	Team	Overall	Conference	Standing	Bowl/playoffs
West Virginia Wesleyan Bobcats (Independent) (1912–1913)
1912	West Virginia Wesleyan	8–0			
1913	West Virginia Wesleyan	5–3			
Western Maryland Green Terror (Independent) (1914)
1914	Western Maryland	4–6			
Western Maryland:		4–6			
Muskingum Fighting Muskies (Independent) (1916)
1916	Muskingum	2–7			
Muskingum:		2–7			
West Virginia Wesleyan Bobcats (Independent) (1921)
1921	West Virginia Wesleyan	0–7			
West Virginia Wesleyan:		13–10			
Total:		19–23			
