= Andy Lyons (English footballer) =

English footballer (born 1966)

Personal information
- Full name: Andrew Lyons
- Date of birth: 19 October 1966 (age 60)
- Place of birth: Blackpool, England
- Position: Midfielder

Senior career*
Years	Team	Apps	(Gls)
1991–1992	Fleetwood Town		
1992–1993	Crewe Alexandra	11	(2)
1993–1996	Wigan Athletic	87	(27)
1996–1998	Partick Thistle	71	(13)
1998–2000	Ayr United	57	(8)
2000–2001	Morecambe	29	(1)
2001	Lancaster City		

Managerial career
- 2008–: Fleetwood Town Under-14
- * Club domestic league appearances and goals

Andrew Lyons (born 19 October 1966) is an English former professional footballer who played as a midfielder. He played in the Football League for Crewe Alexandra and Wigan Athletic, and in the Scottish Football League for Partick Thistle and Ayr United. He later became a coach at Blackpool's Centre of Excellence.

== Career ==
=== Playing career ===
Lyons started his career at Northern Premier League club Fleetwood Town in 1991. On 26 October 1992 he signed for Football League Third Division club Crewe Alexandra for a fee of £15,000. He then moved to fellow Third Division club Wigan Athletic on 1 October 1993.

Lyons moved to Scotland on 1 March 1996 to play for Scottish Premier Division club Partick Thistle for a transfer fee of £35,000. However, they were relegated at the end of the season to the First Division. He left the club at the end of the 1997–98 season when they were relegated to the Second Division. He then signed for First Division club Ayr United. He left Ayr at the end of the 1999–2000 season. He then returned to England, by which time he was playing semi-professionally while working as a postman, and signed for Football Conference club Morecambe where he spent the 2000–01 season.

In August 2001 he moved to local rivals Lancaster City in the Northern Premier League First Division.

=== Masters Football ===
On 30 June 2007 Lyons played for Wigan Athletic Masters Football team in the 2007 North West Masters competition at the M.E.N. Arena in Manchester. He scored one goal in a 5–1 win over Bolton Wanderers as Wigan reached the final where they lost 2–1 to Manchester United. He also played for Wigan at the 2008 Mersey Masters at the Liverpool Echo Arena on 28 June 2008.

=== Coaching career ===
Lyons is now a fully qualified coach, having obtained the UEFA B coaching licence. He is the coach of the Under-14's team at Fleetwood Town Football Club's Academy.
