= Ralph Dacre =

Ralph Dacre may refer to:

- Ralph Dacre, 1st Baron Dacre (c. 1290–1339)
- Ralph Dacre, 3rd Baron Dacre (died 1375), English noble and clergyman
