= Thomas de Multon, 1st Baron Multon of Gilsland =

Lord Thomas de Moulton (21 February 1276 – 26 November 1313) was the first Baron Multon of Gilsland.

== Life ==
Thomas was the great-great-grandson of Thomas de Moulton (d. 1240) and grandson of Thomas II de Multon (d. 1271). His father Thomas was the heir to Thomas II's estates.

On 26 August 1307, Thomas de Moulton was summoned to Parliament as Baron Moulton of Gilsland, the only creation of that title in the Peerage of England. He was engaged in many of the Scottish wars and subsequently obtained many immunities from the crown in the shape of grants for fairs and markets upon his many manors.

He died on 26 November 1313 leaving an only daughter and heiress, Margaret, who inherited the title and estates and was later nicknamed the "Flower of Gillesland". She married Ranulph (Ralph) de Dacre, whom she married because she found him chivalrous. Her father originally opposed the match, but relented when he discovered that the Dacre family was equal to his own in wealth and power, according to the Moulton Annals. Ranulph was later summoned to Parliament as Lord Dacre in 1321. The Multon title and estates were inherited by the Dacre family after Margaret's death in 1361.
