= William Dacre =

William Dacre may refer to:

- William Dacre, 2nd Baron Dacre (1319–1361)
- William Dacre, 5th Baron Dacre (1357–1398)
- William Dacre, 3rd Baron Dacre (1497–1563)
