= Thomas Addison =

English physician and scientist

Thomas Addison RMS
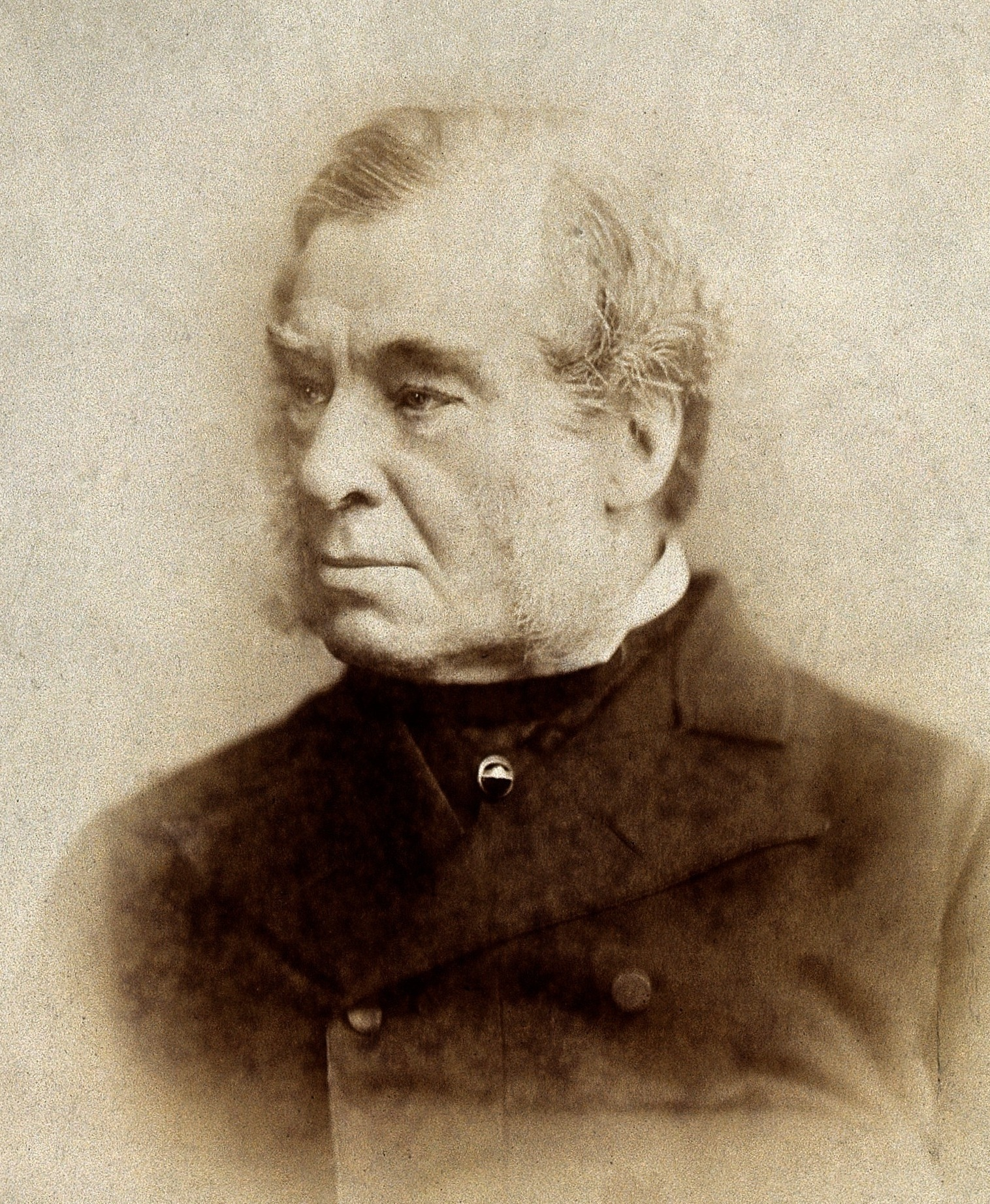
- Born: April 1795; Longbenton, Northumberland, England
- Died: 29 June 1860 (aged 65); Brighton, Sussex, England
- Resting place: Lanercost Priory
- Citizenship: United Kingdom of Great Britain and Ireland
- Education: University of Edinburgh
- Occupation: Physician
- Known for: Addison's Disease, Pernicious anemia

Thomas Addison (April 1795 – 29 June 1860) was an English physician and medical researcher. He is traditionally regarded as one of the "great men" of Guy's Hospital in London.

Thomas Addison began his career at Guy's Hospital in 1817, eventually becoming a full physician in 1837. He was a noted and respected lecturer and diagnostician. He experienced episodes of mental depression throughout his life, culminating in his suicide in 1860.

Addison's legacy includes the description of conditions such as Addison's disease (a degenerative disease of the adrenal glands), and pernicious anemia, a hematological disorder later found to be caused by failure to absorb vitamin B_{12}.

== Early years ==
He was born in April 1795 in Long Benton, nearby to the northeast of Newcastle upon Tyne, the son of Joseph Addison, who was a grocer and flour dealer there. His father's family was Cumbrian, and Thomas was attached to the family house at Banks near Lanercost, as his personal background. Joseph Addison had married Sarah Shaw, and gone into the Shaw family business.

Thomas Addison attended the Long Benton parish school, run by the parish clerk, Thomas Rutter. He then went to the Royal Free Grammar School in Newcastle, where the headmaster was Edward Moises, nephew of the noted Hugh Moises. There he gained a good knowledge of Latin.

== Medical student ==
Addison entered the University of Edinburgh Medical School in 1812 as a medical student, turning down an offer from his father to make him a paying resident student of John Thomson. He became a member of the Royal Medical Society. In 1815, he received the degree of MD. His thesis was on Dissertatio medica inauguralis quaedam de syphilide et hydrargyro complectens (Concerning Syphilis and Mercury).

There is a hiatus in the record of Addison's studies from 1815 to 1817. It has been suggested that he travelled in continental Europe. He enrolled as a physician pupil at Guy's Hospital in London, in 1817. Guy's Medical School recorded his entrance as follows: "Dec. 13, 1817, from Edinburgh, T. Addison, M.D., paid pounds 22-1s to be a perpetual Physician's pupil." Subsequently he became a house surgeon (surgical resident) at the Lock Hospital. He also took a position as physician to the Universal Dispensary founded by John Bunnell Davis.

== Physician ==
Addison obtained his licentiate from the Royal College of Physicians in 1819, where in 1838 he was elected a Fellow. He was promoted to assistant physician, with the support of Benjamin Harrison, in January 1824 and in 1827 he was appointed lecturer of materia medica. In 1849, he was President of the Royal Medical and Chirurgical Society.

As well, Addison worked under Thomas Bateman, a dermatologist, at the General or Public Dispensary on Carey Street, Holborn. He was there for eight years and developed a special interest in skin diseases, and a reputation in the area. He bought a house in Hatton Garden in 1819, and from that time had a private practice.

In 1837, Addison became joint lecturer with Richard Bright on practical medicine, and a full physician at Guy's Hospital. When Bright retired from the lectureship in 1840, Addison became sole lecturer. He held this position until about 1854–55.

Excelling as a diagnostician and lecturer, Addison was diffident. He had a reputation at Guy's, where he concentrated on his students and patients, but was little known outside the hospital, and had few private patients.

== Depression, death and memorial ==
Thomas Addison suffered from episodes of clinical depression at the end of his life. In 1860 he wrote to his medical students as follows: "A considerable breakdown in my health has scared me from the anxieties, responsibilities, and excitement of my profession." Three months later, on 29 June 1860, he committed suicide. The day after his death, the Brighton Herald recorded that:

"Dr Addison, formerly a physician to Guy's Hospital, committed suicide by jumping down the area (i.e. the space between the front of the house and the street) of 15 Wellington Villas, where he had for some time been residing, under the care of two attendants, having before attempted self-destruction."

Addison was buried in the churchyard of Lanercost Priory in Cumberland. Guy's Hospital had a bust made of him, named a hall of the new part of the hospital for him, and perpetuated his memory with a marble wall table in the chapel.

== Research ==
In researching pernicious anemia, Addison in 1849 came across the changed "bronzed" appearance of the adrenal glands. What is now called Addison's disease, sometimes called bronze skin disease, is the progressive destruction of the glands, resulting in adrenocortical hormone deficiency. Addison described this condition in his 1855 publication: On the Constitutional and Local Effects of Disease of the Suprarenal Capsules. The function of the glands, known as suprarenal capsules, was at that time unknown. After Addison's work, it was concluded that they were essential to life. An Addisonian crisis (or Addison's crisis) is an acute, life-threatening crisis caused by Addison's disease.

Pernicious anemia as described in 1849 by Addison is now also known as Addison-Biermer disease. It is a type of megaloblastic anemia, in which a lack of intrinsic factor causes absorption of vitamin B_{12} to be impaired. It is caused by a lack of parietal cells in the stomach.

In 1829, Addison published a study of the actions of poisons. He gave one of the first adequate accounts of appendicitis, in 1839. In the classification of skin diseases by morphology, and their diagnosis, he was a follower of Robert Willan and his own teacher Thomas Bateman.

== Works ==
- A Collection of the published writings of the late Thomas Addison, M.D. 1868, edited by Thomas Mee Daldy and Samuel Wilks

== Family ==
In 1847 Addison married at Lanercost Priory Elizabeth Catherine Hauxwell, a widow, with two children from her first marriage. His stepdaughter Sarah married in 1863 the Rev. Thomas Dodgson, a Durham University graduate.
