= Thomas Barrett-Lennard, 17th Baron Dacre =

English aristocrat (1717 – 1786)

The Right Honourable The Lord Dacre
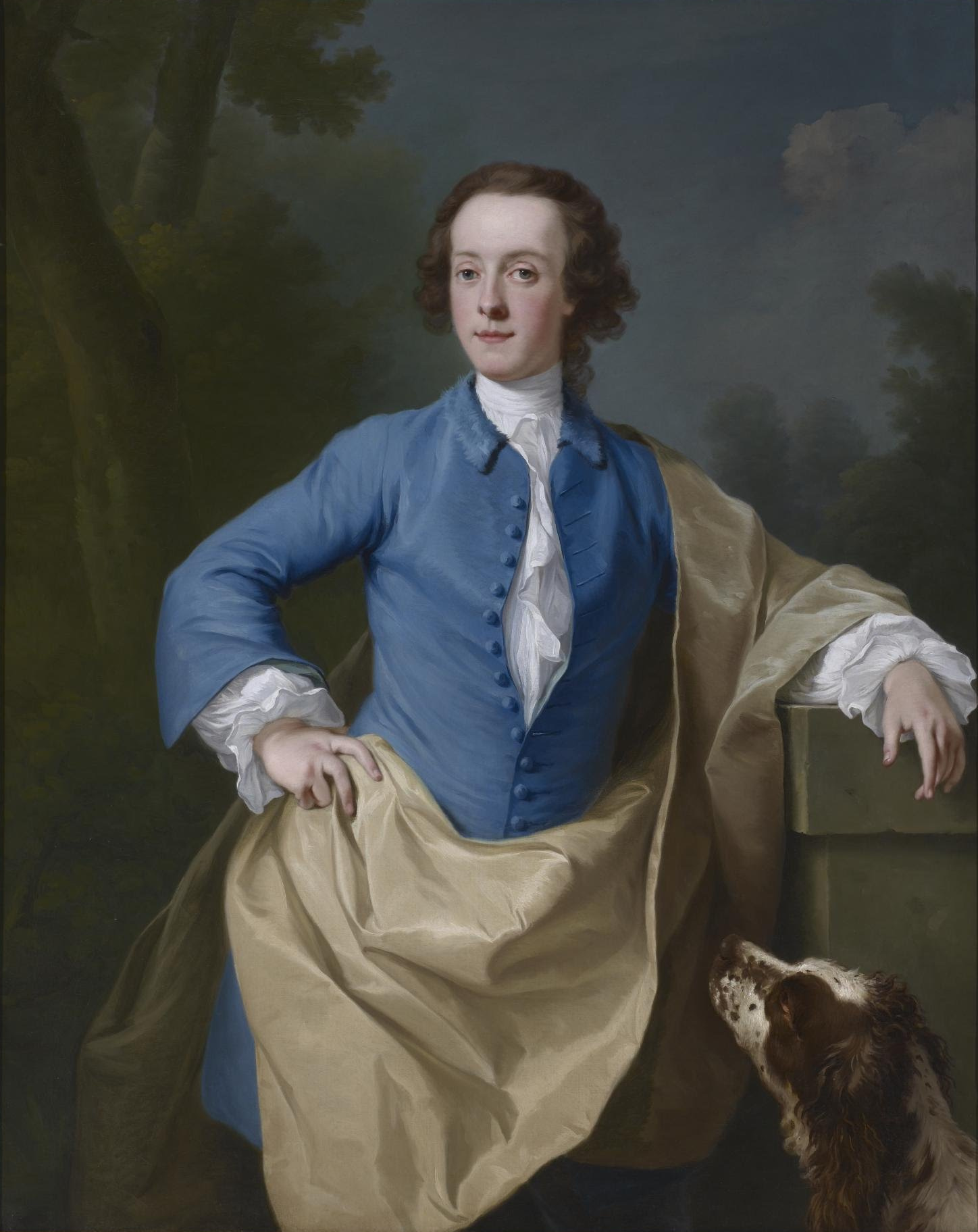
- Portrait of Lord Dacre, by Andrea Soldi, between 1736 and 1744
- Born: Thomas Barrett; 20 April 1717
- Died: 12 January 1786 (aged 68); London, England
- Education: Harrow School
- Spouse: Anna Maria Pratt (m. 1739)
- Children: 1
- Parent(s): Richard Barrett; Anne Lennard, 16th Baroness Dacre
- Relatives: Thomas Lennard, 1st Earl of Sussex (grandfather); Anne Lennard, Countess of Sussex (grandmother)

Thomas Barrett-Lennard, 17th Baron Dacre (20 April 1717 – 12 January 1786) was an English aristocrat.

== Early life ==
Thomas Barrett was born on 20 April 1717. He was the son of Richard Barrett and Anne Lennard, later 16th Baroness Dacre. After his father's death in 1716, his mother married Henry Roper, 8th Baron Teynham, in c. March 1717. After Lord Teynham's death from a self-inflicted gunshot in 1723, she married Irish MP, the Hon. Robert Moore (younger son of the 3rd Earl of Drogheda), in 1725.

His paternal grandparents were Dacre Barrett and the former Lady Jane Chichester (eldest daughter of the 2nd Earl of Donegall). His maternal grandparents were Thomas Lennard, 1st Earl of Sussex and Lady Anne Fitzroy (the illegitimate daughter of King Charles II and Barbara Villiers, Duchess of Cleveland).

He was educated at Harrow School.

== Career ==
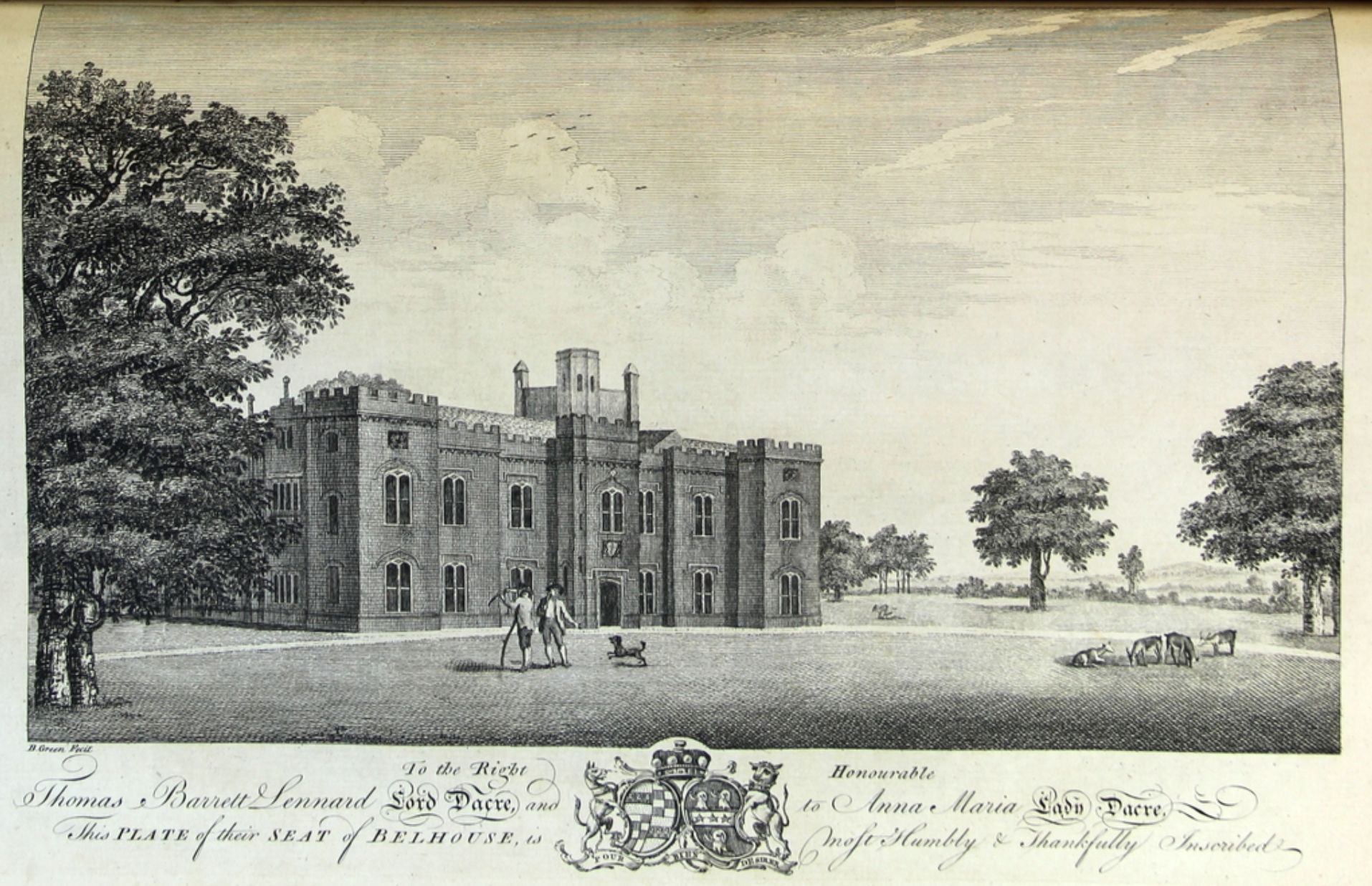
Belhus in Aveley, Essex, the seat of the 17th Baron Dacre.

Barrett-Lennard succeeded as the 17th Baron Dacre upon the death of his mother on 26 June 1755. His mother had become suo jure Baroness Dacre in 1741 after the death of her elder sister, Lady Barbara Skelton (née Lennard), when the abeyance of her father's barony was terminated in her favor. Their father's earldom, however, had become extinct upon his death in 1715.

After their daughter died in 1749, Thomas and Anna went on the "Grand Tour as a distraction during their recovery. After visiting Naples, Florence, Venice and other Italian cities, the couple arrived in Rome around 1750, where they met painter Pompeo Batoni." In 1745, his wife had her portrait painted the prominent English portrait-painter Isaac Whood.

== Personal life ==
On 15 May 1739, Thomas married Anna Maria Pratt in London. Anna was the daughter of Elizabeth Wilson and Sir John Pratt, an MP for Midhurst who served as Lord Chief Justice of England between 1712 and 1725. Her elder brother was Charles Pratt, 1st Earl Camden. Together, they were the parents of:

- Hon. Anne Barbara Barrett-Lennard (1740–1749), who "died of a sudden fever when she was only nine years old."

With Elizabeth FitzThomas, Lord Dacre had two illegitimate children, who were brought up by Lord and Lady Dacre as if they were their own. Of the two children, the son, Thomas Barrett-Lennard (1762–1857), became an MP for Essex South and was created a baronet of Belhus in 1801.

Lord Dacre died on 12 January 1786 in London without legitimate male issue. The barony passed to his nephew, Trevor Charles Roper (1745–1794), the son of his younger half-brother. His widow died on 11 August 1806.

Peerage of England
Preceded by Anne Lennard	Baron Dacre; 1755–1786	Succeeded by Trevor Charles Roper
