= Samuel Ogle (1659–1719) =

English politician (1659–1719)

Samuel Ogle (1659 – 10 March 1719) was an English Whig politician and lawyer. He sat in the English, and later British, House of Commons as a Member of Parliament for Berwick-upon-Tweed from 1690 till 1710. He was also a public official in the Dublin Castle administration in Ireland, and represented Belfast in the Irish House of Commons between 1707 and 1713.

== Early life ==
Ogle was baptised on 25 March 1659. He was the second but first surviving son of Rev. Luke Ogle (died 1696) and Mary, the daughter of Arthur Foster. His father had been a prominent Dissenting preacher, who had been prosectuted several times and was imprisoned briefly in the 1690s and during the Monmouth Rebellion.

Ogle was educated at Edinburgh University and entered Gray's Inn in 1677. He was called to the bar in 1688 at the request of Judge Jeffreys, and became an Ancient 1702. In 1689 he was appointed Recorder of Berwick-upon-Tweed.

== Political career ==
Ogle was returned to the House of Commons of England as a member for Berwick-upon-Tweed at the 1690 English general election. He was soon identified as a supporter of the Whig court faction by Thomas Osborne. He retained his seat at the 1695 English general election and in the following session was a firm supporter of the ministry. He was quick to sign the Association of 1696 and voted in favour of the attainder of Sir John Fenwick, 3rd Baronet. In February 1697 he was elected to the Whig Rose Club, and was later thought to have served as its chairman.

Outside parliament, Ogle was an active member of the Berwick corporation and he worked alongside Ralph Grey to represent the commercial and political interests of the town, especially in relation to trade. Elected again at the 1698 English general election, he remained a court supporter and took a prominent role in the transaction of business in the Commons. In 1699, thanks to the support of Ford Grey, 1st Earl of Tankerville, Ogle was appointed a revenue commissioner in the Kingdom of Ireland; in subsequent years he split his time between Dublin, London and Berwick.

After the January 1701 English general election, Ogle was appointed to multiple parliamentary committees, including one to examine expiring laws. His interest in Irish affairs increased after the November 1701 English general election, when he took charge of no fewer than five bills concerned with forfeited estates in Ireland. By 1703, the demands of his official duties in Dublin had caused his attendance at Westminster to decrease, but he continued to vote along Whig lines. In October 1704 was either absent from or voted against the Tory Tack.

In 1707 Ogle was elected to the Irish House of Commons as a member for Belfast. His sympathy for religious dissenters was evident in his support for a relaxation of the Sacramental Test Act (1704) in Ireland. At the beginning of 1708, an analysis of the British Commons classed him as a Whig and he voted in favour of the Foreign Protestants Naturalization Act 1708.

Ogle did not stand for re-election in Berwick at the 1710 British general election, but instead focused his efforts on ensuring he kept his place on the Irish revenue under the new Tory Harley ministry. He was successful in ingratiuating himself to the new administration, such that by July 1712, Whigs in Ireland were said to be "stark mad at Mr Ogle being continued in the commission". This loyalty to Harley resulted in Ogle being paid £300, in addition to his salary, from secret service funds in 1712. Upon the Hanoverian succession in 1714, Ogle was removed from office. He had stood down as an Irish MP the previous year.

== Personal life ==
He married his first wife, Elizabeth (died 1697), the widow of Thomas Dawson and they had one daughter. His marriage to his second wife, Ursula, the daughter of Sir Robert Markham, 2nd Baronet was licensed on 4 October 1701 and they had five sons and two daughters.

Ogle made his will in Dublin on 4 March 1719 and died six days later. He was succeeded in his estates by his eldest son, Samuel Ogle.

Parliament of Great Britain
Preceded by Parliament of England	Member of Parliament for Berwick-upon-Tweed; 1707–1710; With: Jonathan Hutchinson	Succeeded by Jonathan Hutchinson; William Kerr
Parliament of England
Preceded by Francis Blake; Philip Babington	Member of Parliament for Berwick-upon-Tweed; 1690–1707; With: Francis Blake (1690–95); Ralph Grey (1695–98); Francis Blake (1698–1701); Ralph Grey (1701); Francis Blake (1701–02); Jonathan Hutchinson (1702–07)	Succeeded by Parliament of Great Britain
Parliament of Ireland
Preceded by William Crafford; William Cairnes	Member of Parliament for Belfast; 1707–1713; With: William Crafford	Succeeded by Robert Moore; Anthony Atkinson
