= Lanercost Priory =

Monastery in Cumbria, England

Coordinates: 54.9662°N 2.6949°W

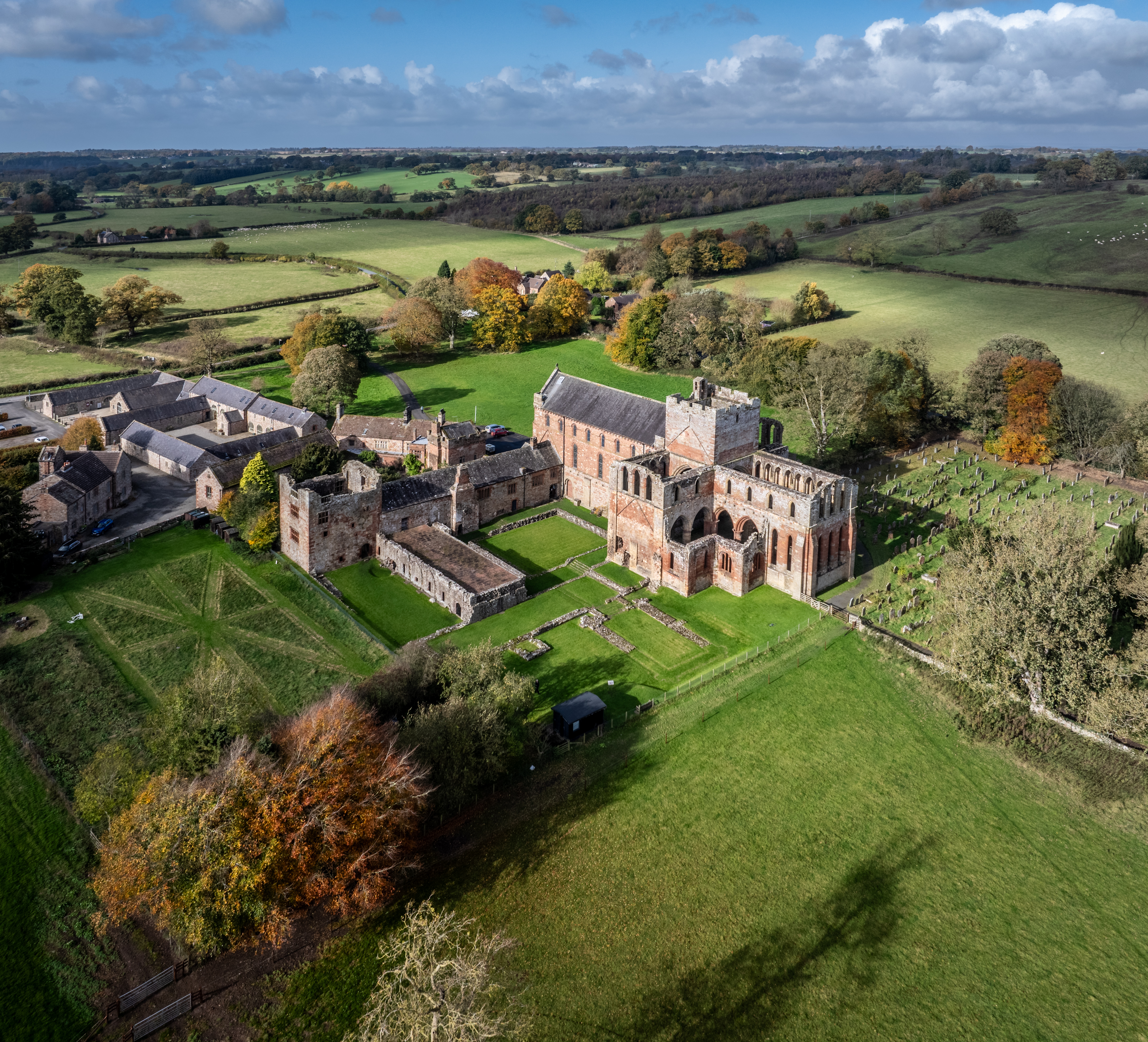
- Aerial view of Lanercost Priory
- Interactive map of Lanercost Priory

Monastery information
- Full name: Lanercost Priory
- Order: Augustinian
- Established: Ca. 1169
- Disestablished: 1538
- Diocese: Carlisle

People
- Founder: Robert de Vaux

Site
- Location: Lanercost, Cumbria, England
- Visible remains: Nave still used as the parish church, and impressive ruins of the east end. West range used as parish rooms
- Public access: Yes

Lanercost Priory was founded by Robert de Vaux between 1165 and 1174, the most likely date being 1169, to house Augustinian canons. The priory is situated in the village of Lanercost, Cumbria, England, within sight of Naworth Castle, with which it had close connections. The medieval buildings used many convenient Roman stones from the nearby Hadrian's Wall.

Apart from the church, the priory buildings are now ruins, but parts of the church are intact and remain in use. It is now open to the public and in the guardianship of English Heritage.

The Lanercost Chronicle, a thirteenth-century history of England and the Wars of Scottish Independence, was compiled by the monks of the priory.

== Early years ==
The foundation date was traditionally 1169, but can only be dated definitely between 1165 and 1174 on the evidence of charters. The dedication is to Mary Magdalene, unusual in the region.

It would seem the arrangements for founding the priory were well advanced by the time of the foundation charter, as opposed to the more gradual process at Wetheral and St Bees priories. Robert de Vaux gave the land of Lanercost "between the ancient wall and the Irthing and between Burth and Poltros, the vill of Walton by stated bounds, the church of that vill with the chapel of 'Treverman,' the churches of Irthington, Brampton, Carlaton and Farlam". The charter of foundation states that the benefaction was made for the sake of Henry II, and for the health of the souls of his father Hubert and his mother Grace.

Soon after the foundation of the house, Robert de Vaux granted to the canons the right of free election, so that when the lord prior died the person on whom the choice of the canons or the greater part of them fell should be elected in his place.

The bulk of the church building dates from the late 13th century, though there is evidence of earlier work. The priory buildings were constructed, at least in part, from stones derived from the nearby Hadrian's Wall, including a number of Roman inscriptions that were built into its fabric.

== Visitors and raiders ==
The proximity to Scotland inevitably had an effect on the fortunes of the priory, and it was a target of Scots attacks in retaliation for English raids. This became acute after the outbreak of the Wars of Scottish Independence. In 1296 the Scottish army encamped at Lanercost after burning Hexham priory and Lambley nunnery. The Scots were interrupted before the damage could become great, and they retreated through Nicolforest, having burnt some houses of the monastery but not the church. Similar depredations under Wallace continued the next year and led to calls for reprisals from the English.

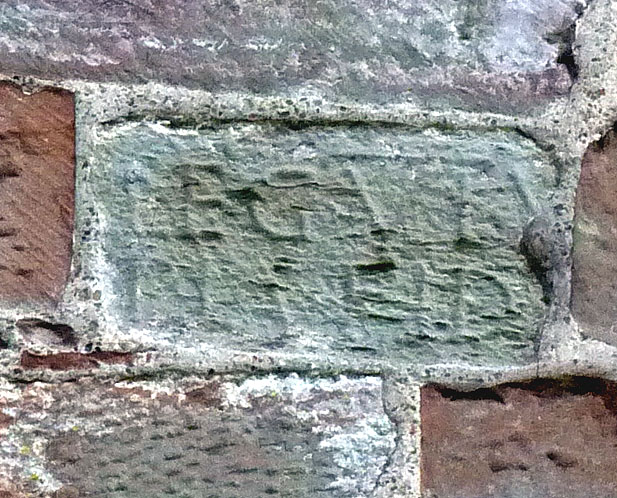
Roman inscription, recording the presence of Legio VI Victrix on Hadrian's Wall nearby, now built into the priory wall.

Edward I made several visits to the priory in the latter part of his reign. In the autumn of 1280 he visited in the company of Queen Eleanor of Castile on his way to Newcastle. The canons met him at the gate in their copes, and although staying only a few days, he found time to take 200 stags and hinds while hunting in Inglewood forest. In 1300, on his way to the siege of Caerlaverock Castle, Edward stayed at Lanercost for a short while.

Edward's last visit was in 1306, travelling in a horse litter owing to age and illness, and accompanied by Queen Margaret of France, his second wife. He arrived at Michaelmas and his stay extended until the following Easter, a duration of 6 months which put a huge burden upon the resources of the priory. It was while Edward was at Lanercost that the brothers of Robert de Brus and other Scottish captives were sent to Carlisle for execution by his order.

This last royal visit depleted the reserves of the priory, and the canons begged him for recompense, but a deal to acquire the church of 'Hautwyselle,' worth about 100 marks a year, fell through. However the king granted the appropriation of the churches of Mitford in Northumberland and Carlatton in Cumberland, for the relief of the Priory. In a letter to the Pope, Edward gave his reasons for generosity being the special devotion he felt to St Mary Magdalene, his long stay due to illness, and making good the damage of the Scots. Edward died shortly afterwards at Burgh by Sands in July 1307, whilst still campaigning against the Scots.

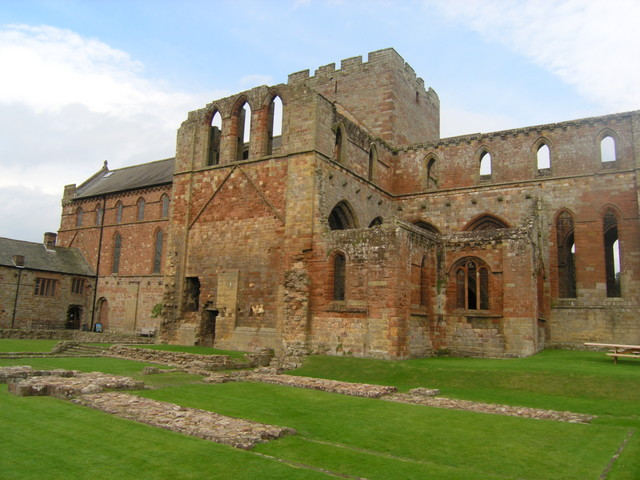
Lanercost Priory from the south. The foundations of the conventual buildings are in the foreground.

In August 1311, Robert Bruce, King of Scotland, came with his army and made it his headquarters for three days, "committing infinite evils" and imprisoning some canons, though later letting them free. By contrast in 1328, in fulfilment of the treaty between the Bruce and Edward III, a mutual interchange of good offices took place between the priory of Lanercost and Kelso Abbey in respect of their common revenues out of the church of Lazonby. Later though, in 1346, David II ransacked the conventual buildings and desecrated the church. Fresh from the overthrow of Liddel he "entered the holy place with haughtiness, threw out the vessels of the temple, stole the treasures, broke the doors, took the jewels, and destroyed everything they could lay hands on". As late as 1386, one of the priors was taken prisoner by the Scots and ransomed for a fixed sum of money and four score quarters of corn.

The fortunes of the priory were linked to the state of warfare and raids on the border. The priory was in relatively affluent circumstances before the outbreak of the war of Independence in 1296, and the annual revenue of the house was returned at £74 12s 6d in the 1291 valuation of Pope Nicholas IV. But by the taxation of 1318, the value had fallen almost to nothing.

== The parish church ==
Lanercost Priory was dissolved in 1538 by Henry VIII, and the conventual buildings were stripped of their roofs, excepting the church building which continued in use as the parish church. In the late 17th century, as the nave deteriorated, the congregation used just the north aisle which had been re-roofed.

In 1747, the nave was re-roofed, but by 1847 the Priory was in a state of disrepair to the extent that the east end roof collapsed. However, by 1849, The church was in use again after a major restoration by Anthony Salvin. In the 1870s, there was further restoration by the Carlisle architect C. J. Ferguson.

At the Dissolution, ownership had passed to the Dacre family, and then in the early 18th century to the Howards. In 1929, the Priory ruins were put into public ownership, and today they are managed by English Heritage.

== Church records ==
Parish registers for Lanercost St Mary Magdalene survive from 1684, with bishop's transcripts extant from 1666, and continue through the late 20th century. Bishop Nicolson noted in 1703 that no register books existed earlier, and the present registers were transcribed and published in 1908. The original records are held at Carlisle Record Office (CASCat reference PR121) and are accessible on microfilm.

== Architecture ==
=== Church ===
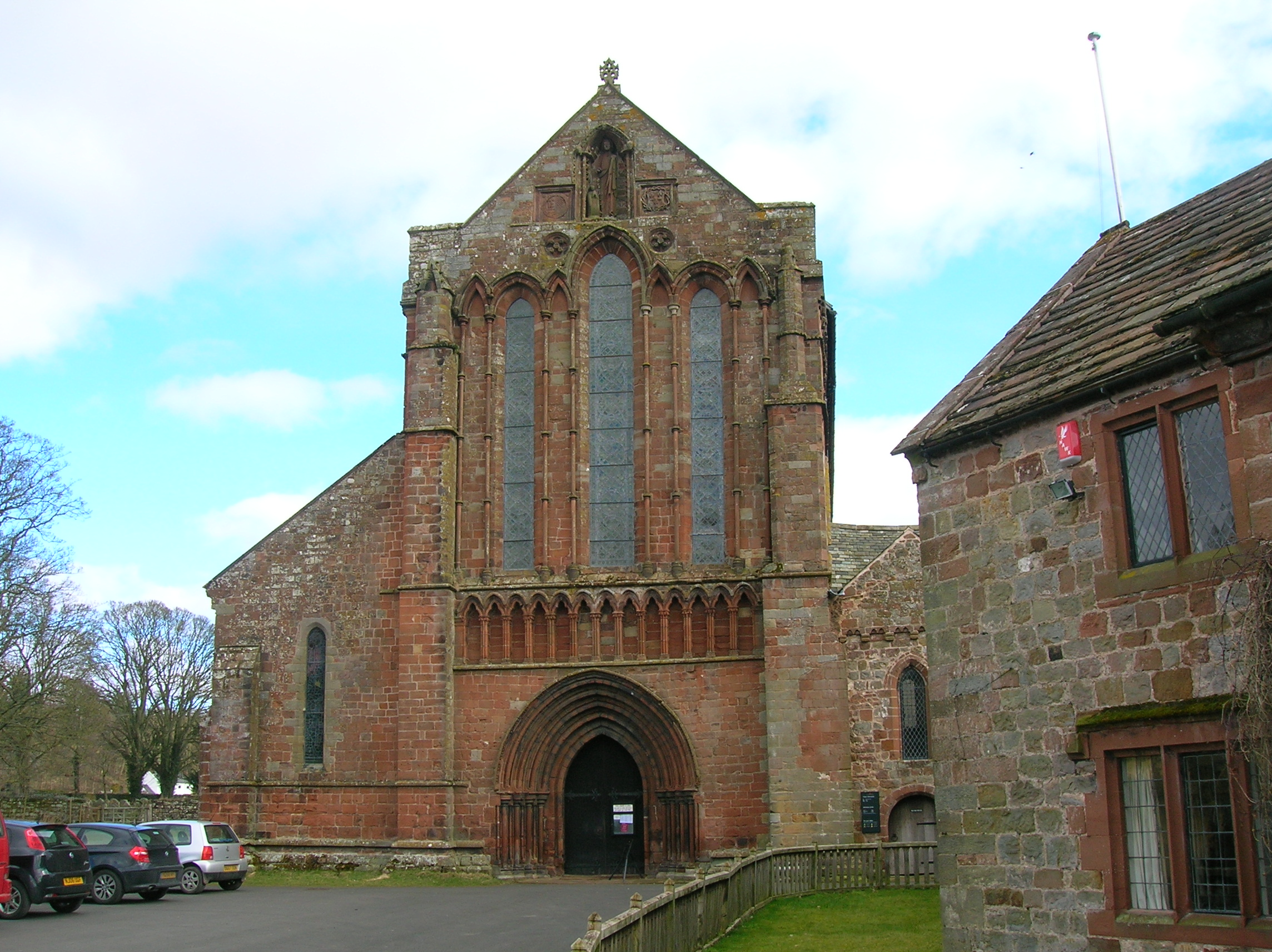
West front of Lanercost Priory, with the statue of Mary Magdalene at top

The nave has an aisle to the north but a blank wall with no aisle to the south, where it abuts the cloister. The statue of St Mary Magdalene, given by King Edward I, still survives in a niche high up on the west front.

The impressive ruined chancel and crossing of c.1220–1230 are in a good state of preservation; as high as the eaves, and would only require a roof and windows to be restored to the original condition. The chapels to the north of the chancel retain their stone vaults, which now cover the Dacre tombs. The vaults to the south were replaced by timber ceilings (now vanished) in the later Middle Ages. The oldest masonry is in the south transept, and dates from the late 12th century.

A dossal – an embroidered wall hanging – designed by William Morris in 1881, underwent restoration before being rehung behind the priory altar in 2013–14.

=== Other buildings ===
The cloister and monastic buildings have been largely dismantled, except for the west range, which was made into a house by Sir Thomas Dacre in the 16th century. As part of this conversion, the monastic kitchen was rebuilt and heightened into a pele tower. The undercroft of the south range also survives with its ribbed vault. This may have served as the canons' warming room.

Beyond the cloister, there is a so-called 'vicar's pele', which was greatly altered in the 19th century. The inner arch of the main gatehouse survives to the west of the church, with the stubs of the passage vault.

== Memorials ==
The priory has an unusual medieval stone carving called the Lanercost Cross with an inscription dating back to 1214. Originally the cross was set just outside the entrance to the church. Today, the stump of the cross remains, but the main shaft is housed inside the priory. In the churchyard is the tomb of Thomas Addison, scientist and physician. In the nave is a memorial to the Reverend Henry Whitehead, former vicar of Lanercost, best known for his pioneering epidemiological work with John Snow on cholera.

Humphrey Dacre, 1st Baron Dacre, and his widow Mabel were both buried at the Priory in the 15th century, as is Thomas Dacre, 2nd Baron Dacre.

== Other burials ==
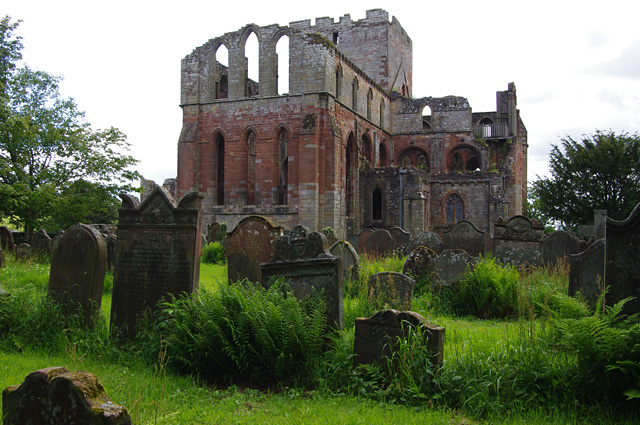
The Graveyard at Lanercost Priory

- Ralph Dacre, 1st Baron Dacre
- Hugh Dacre, 4th Baron Dacre
- William Dacre, 5th Baron Dacre
- Thomas Dacre, 6th Baron Dacre
- Philippa de Neville
- Thomas Dacre, 2nd Baron Dacre
- George Howard, 9th Earl of Carlisle
- Rosalind Howard, Countess of Carlisle
- Charles Howard, 10th Earl of Carlisle

The church is also home to a large graveyard to the Northeast of the Priory, the first recorded burial being in 1665 however it was most likely used long before then, each row has the stones facing west with many dating pre 1800.

== In popular culture ==
The final visit of Edward I and the daily life of the canons are contrasted in the 1985 song "Lanercost" by British folk rock band Steeleye Span.

== See also ==
- List of English abbeys, priories and friaries serving as parish churches
- Grade I listed buildings in Cumbria
- Grade I listed churches in Cumbria
- Listed buildings in Burtholme
