= Thomas Barrett-Lennard =

Thomas Barrett-Lennard may refer to:

- Sir Thomas Barrett-Lennard, 1st Baronet (1761–1857), British politician, MP for Essex South 1832–1835
- Thomas Barrett-Lennard (politician) (1788–1856), British Whig politician and MP, son of the above
- Thomas Barrett-Lennard, 17th Baron Dacre (1717–1786), English aristocrat
