= Lanercost (song) =

"Lanercost" is a folk song by the folk rock group Steeleye Span. It was released as the B-side of the single "Somewhere in London" in 1985. It then featured on their 1986 album Back in Line and was later included on the 1999 A Rare Collection 1972-1996.

"Lanercost" was written by Maddy Prior (who sings the lead vocals on the piece) and Rick Kemp.

== Lyrics and content ==
Lanercost is a village near to a priory of the same name in the north of Cumbria, close to the Scottish border. The lyrics describe part of the life of English King Edward I, who fought to subdue the Scottish. Towards the end of his life, the King spent time at Lanercost Priory, directing a campaign against Robert the Bruce.

The King, although ill, caught and hanged three of the Bruce's (four) brothers. Ultimately, however, he died when leading his army north.

Each of the four verses begins by describing the actions of the canons (priests) at the priory - fishing; praying; working in the scriptorium and finally carrying the King's coffin. The rest of each verse then discusses Edward and his actions - lying in bed "cursing fate" (as he is too ill to fight); delighting at his capture and execution of the Bruce's brothers; leaving to ride north and then dying before his work can be finished. The chorus is centered on a repetition of the Kyrie eleison (in fact spelled 'elaison' in the sleeve notes), presumably suggesting that this would have been sung by the canons themselves. The Kyrie lyrics are not included on the Shanachie LP liner notes.

== Variants ==
According to Reinhard Zierke, the single version has an instrumental ending whereas the album version ends with an a cappella chorus.
