= Nicholas Harrington =

Member of the Parliament of England

Sir Nicholas Harrington of Hornby, Lancashire (c. 1345/6 – 1404), was an English Member of Parliament who was born in Farleton, Lancashire. He was the third and youngest son of Sir John Harrington of Hornby and Katherine Banastre (died 1359) whose family was involved in the Banastre Rebellion.

== Early life ==
His father died in 1358, and his elder brothers, Robert and Thomas, both followed their father, in rapid succession; dying, supposedly, 'in parts beyond the sea' in two separate events (February and then August 1361 respectively. Harrington then being the remaining heir, entered his inheritance in circa 1360, having been a ward of Sir James Pickering, who had purchased the wardship from John of Gaunt. He went to Ireland in 1369 where he fought for at least two years, accompanied in service by his former guardian, under one William Windsor (who was married to Alice Perrers, King Edward III's mistress).

== Career and illegal activities ==
In 1373, Harrington was party, with Sir William Curwen, to a raid on Beaumont (near Carlisle, Cumberland). This specifically attacked the lands of Ralph, Lord Dacre, and the large attacking force carried away much of value. Called a 'a rapidly escalating vendetta,' it was doubtless part of the same Dacre family feud that saw Ralph Dacre murdered by his own brother Hugh two years later. Still retained by John of Gaunt, and with Pickering acting as his mainprisor he returned to Crown favour by 1379, with his appointment as Lancashire sheriff, and was finally issued an official pardon by Gaunt. In 1393, he received another pardon from Gaunt, this time for repeatedly poaching game and holding illegal hunts in Gaunt's ducal forests, which was then reissued four years later.

== Royal service ==
Knighted by April 1369, he was five-time MP for Lancashire; his final entry to the House of Commons of England was less than two years before his death. In 1379 was appointed Sheriff, an office he held for the next five years. He sat on a multitude of royal commissions of array, Oyer and terminer, assize, and shipwreck over thirty years until 1398.

== Family and death ==
Harrington was twice wed, firstly to Isabel English (by September 1369), and secondly he had married the twice-widowed Joan Venables by August 1397, because she died 18 August 1397.

By his first wife he had several children, William, James, Nicholas, Isabel I, Margaret, Agnes, Mary and Elizabeth (Isabel II).

His second marriage brought him an augmentation of his estates, as Joan was a widow, and controlled her dead husband's estates in Huyton and Knowsley. There was no issue from his second marriage. Harrington appears to have died sometime before February 1404, after which he leaves no official trace.

His estates passed to his eldest son, Sir William, and Nicholas and James entered the household of Henry IV as squires. Sir William became a Knight of the Garter displaying the arms Sable a fret argent, while Sir James combined the tinctures of his paternal arms (sable and argent) with the arms of Henry IV to create differenced arms, blazoned: Sable three leopards argent.

Via his daughter Isabel, he is the great-great-great-grandfather of Queen Katherine Parr and great-great-grandfather to Bishop of Durham Cuthbert Tunstall. Via his daughter Elizabeth he is the great-grandfather of Thomas Stanley, 1st Earl of Derby (husband of Lady Margaret Beaufort and step-father to Henry VII of England).
