= Anthony Atkinson =

Anthony Atkinson may refer to:

- Tony Atkinson (1944–2017), British economist
- Anthony Atkinson (politician) (1681–1743), Irish politician
