= Burtholme =

Civil parish in Cumbria, England

Coordinates: 54.970°N 2.692°W

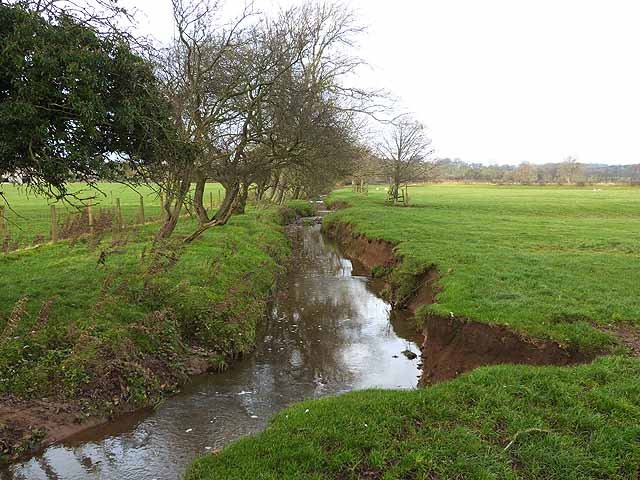
- Burtholme Beck

- Location within Cumbria
- OS grid reference: NY557641
- Civil parish: Burtholme
- Unitary authority: Cumberland
- Ceremonial county: Cumbria
- Region: North West
- Country: England
- Sovereign state: United Kingdom
- Post town: BRAMPTON
- Postcode district: CA8
- Dialling code: 016977
- Police: Cumbria
- Fire: Cumbria
- Ambulance: North West
- UK Parliament: Carlisle

Burtholme refers to any of a civil parish in Cumbria, England, a hamlet within that parish or a family name originally linked to the place. It also appears in Burtholme Beck, which marks a significant point on Hadrian's Wall.

== Burtholme Civil Parish ==
Burtholme is a civil parish within the Cumberland district in Cumbria, in North West England. Civil parishes such as Burtholme were established in 1894. The villages of Lanercost and Banks are in the parish. Burtholme sits within the ecclesiastical parish of Lanercost, which along with the civil parishes of Askerton, Kingwater and Waterhead are on the banks of the River Irthing. The population of this civil parish taken at the 2021 census was 195.

Hadrian's Wall runs through the parish.

== Burtholme ==
Burtholme is also a small hamlet within the parish. The land around the hamlet extends down to the River Irthing and presumably is the holme (a piece of flat low-lying ground by a river or stream) of Burtholme or Burt's holme. The name dates back to the Danelaw and was well established by the time that Lanercost Priory was founded in 1169, the founding charter of which made Burtholme Beck the western boundary of its land.

== Burtholme Beck ==
Burtholme Beck is a small beck running through the parish of Burtholme feeding into the River Irthing. It is crossed by Hadrian's Wall and is close to the point (Turret 53B) at which the building material used for Hadrian's Wall changed from Limestone (to the east) to red sandstone (to the west).

== See also ==
- Listed buildings in Burtholme
