= Robert Moore (Irish politician) =

Irish politician

The Honourable Robert Moore

Member of Parliament for County Louth
- In office 1715–1727 Serving with Richard Tisdall
- Preceded by: Richard Tisdall; Stephen Ludlow
- Succeeded by: Faithful Fortescue; William Aston

Member of Parliament for Belfast
- In office 1713–1715 Serving with Anthony Atkinson
- Preceded by: William Crafford; Samuel Ogle
- Succeeded by: George Macartney; John Ichingham Chichester

Personal details
- Born: 11 April 1688
- Died: 2 July 1728 (aged 40) Epsom, Surrey
- Spouse(s): Anne Roper, Baroness Teynham (m. 1725; died 1728)
- Relations: Charles Moore, Viscount Moore (brother); Henry Moore, 4th Earl of Drogheda (nephew); Edward Moore, 5th Earl of Drogheda (nephew)
- Parent(s): Henry Hamilton-Moore, 3rd Earl of Drogheda and Mary Cole

The Honourable Robert Moore (baptised 11 April 1688 – 3 July 1728) was an Anglo-Irish politician.

== Early life ==
Moore was baptised on 11 April 1688 at St Margaret's, Westminster. He was a younger son of Henry Hamilton-Moore, 3rd Earl of Drogheda and Mary Cole (d. 1726). Among his siblings were elder brother, Charles Moore, Viscount Moore, and sisters, Lady Alice Moore (wife of Sir Gustavus Hume, 3rd Baronet) and Lady Elizabeth Moore (wife of George Rochfort, MP for County Westmeath).

His paternal grandparents were Henry Moore, 1st Earl of Drogheda and Hon. Alice Spencer (sister of the 1st Earl of Sunderland, and younger daughter of the 2nd Baron Spencer). His maternal grandparents were Sir John Cole, 1st Baronet and Elizabeth Chichester (a daughter of Hon. John Chichester, MP, second son of the 1st Viscount Chichester). Among his extended family was uncle, Arthur Cole, 1st Baron Ranelagh.

== Career ==
Moore lived at West Lodge, Enfield Chase. He was returned as a Member of Parliament for County Louth in 1713 serving until 1715. In 1715, he was returned for Belfast, serving until 1727.

== Personal life ==
On 16 October 1725, Moore married, as her third husband, Lady Anne Roper (née Lennard), Baroness Teynham and suo jure Baroness Dacre at St. James, Westminster. Lady Anne was the eldest surviving daughter and heiress of Thomas Lennard, 1st Earl of Sussex and Lady Anne FitzRoy (herself the eldest illegitimate daughter of King Charles II and Barbara Palmer, 1st Duchess of Cleveland). Lady Anne was the widow of Richard Barrett-Lennard and Henry Roper, 8th Baron Teynham. Before his death, they had one son, Henry.

Moore died on 3 July 1728 at Epsom, Surrey. His widow died 26 June 1755 and was buried at St Anne Westminster.

Parliament of Ireland
Preceded by William Crafford; Samuel Ogle	Member of Parliament for Belfast; 1713–1715; With: Anthony Atkinson	Succeeded by George Macartney; John Ichingham Chichester
Preceded by Richard Tisdall; Stephen Ludlow	Member of Parliament for County Louth; 1715–1727; With: Richard Tisdall	Succeeded by Faithful Fortescue; William Aston
