= William Dacre, 2nd Baron Dacre =

English peer

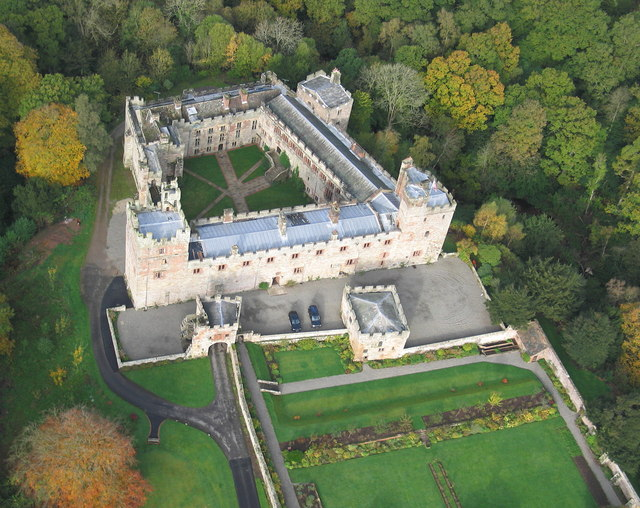
- Naworth Castle, seat of the Dacre family
- Born: 1319
- Died: 1361 (aged 41–42)
- Noble family: Dacre
- Spouse: Catherine Neville
- Father: Ralph Dacre, 1st Baron Dacre
- Mother: Margaret de Multon, 2nd Baroness Multon of Gilsland

William Dacre, 2nd Baron Dacre (ca. 1319–1361) was an English peer. In the final months of his life, he was also 3rd Baron Multon of Gilsland. In some sources, he is called William de Dacre.

== Life ==
Dacre was the son of Ralph Dacre, 1st Baron Dacre (ca. 1290–1339), by his marriage to Margaret de Multon (died 1361), later suo jure Baroness Multon of Gilsland.

Dacre inherited from his father (who commanded the English forces at the Battle of Dornock) the Barony of Dacre and from his mother that of Multon of Gilsland. He married Catherine Neville, daughter of Ralph Neville, 2nd Baron Neville de Raby, but died childless in 1361 and was succeeded in the baronies by his brother Ralph, who was later succeeded by another brother, Hugh.

He was summoned to Parliament on 25 November 1350.

Dacre held the Lancashire manors of Skelmersdale, Whiston, Speke, and Parr, and he obtained a charter for the holding of a three-day market and moveable fair at Prescot, then also in Lancashire, to begin on the Wednesday following Corpus Christi. In this grant, Dacre is described as "parson of the church of Prescote", and he was undoubtedly its patron. In 1375, his brother Ralph was the rector of Prescot.

Dacre died in 1361, holding also the manor of Halton in Lancashire.

Peerage of England
| Preceded by Ralph Dacre | Baron Dacre; 1339–1361 | Succeeded by Ralph Dacre |
| Preceded by Margaret Dacre | Baron Multon of Gilsland; 1361 | Succeeded by Ralph Dacre |
