= Baron Multon of Gilsland =

Barony in the Peerage of England

Baron Multon of Gilsland was a title in the Peerage of England. It was created when on 26 August 1307 Thomas de Multon was summoned to parliament. At his death, his daughter Margaret inherited the title; she married Ralph Dacre, who was summoned to parliament as Baron Dacre and not as Baron Multon in 1321. If the Multon barony was extant thereafter, it can be supposed to have descended with the new Dacre one.

== Barons Multon of Gilsland (1307) ==
- Thomas de Multon, 1st Baron Multon of Gilsland (ca. 1282–1313)
- Margaret de Multon, 2nd Baroness Multon of Gilsland (d. 1361)
- William Dacre, 2nd Baron Dacre, 3rd Baron Multon of Gilsland (ca. 1319–1361)
