= Banks, Cumbria =

Village in Cumbria, England

Coordinates: 54.974°N 02.673°W

Banks
- Village
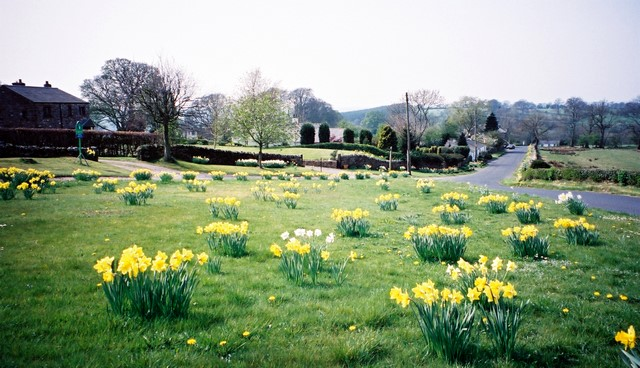
- Village green, Banks

- Location in the former City of Carlisle district Location within Cumbria
- OS grid reference: NY5664
- Civil parish: Burtholme
- Unitary authority: Cumberland
- Ceremonial county: Cumbria
- Region: North West
- Country: England
- Sovereign state: United Kingdom
- Post town: BRAMPTON
- Postcode district: CA8
- Dialling code: 016977
- Police: Cumbria
- Fire: Cumbria
- Ambulance: North West
- UK Parliament: Carlisle

Banks is a village in Cumbria, England, astride the course of Hadrian's Wall, 3 mile (5 km) NE of the market town of Brampton. The historic Lanercost Priory is just a mile (1.5 km) to the SW.

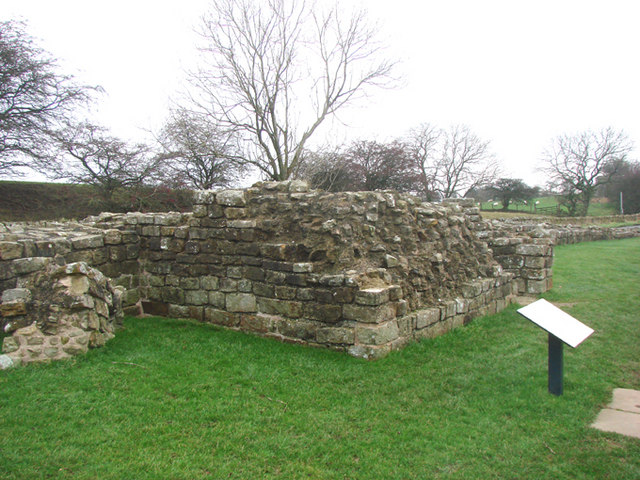
Banks East Turret

The village was previously called Bankys, Bankes, and les Bankes iuxta Lanercost. Its name derives from the nearby Roman fortifications. Banks East Turret is a relatively well-preserved turret with adjoining stretches of Hadrian's Wall.

== See also ==
- Listed buildings in Burtholme
