= John Harrington of Hornby =

Sir John Harrington of Hornby, Lancashire (About 1310 – 1359), was a fourteenth-century knight and founder of the medieval Harrington dynasty in the North of England, known as the Harringtons of Farleton and Hornby. They were a cadet branch of the Harringtons of Aldingham, Sir John being the second son of the first Lord Harrington, who died in 1347. At some point he married Katherine Banastre. Sir John the younger held Farleton manor jointly with Katherine for a peppercorn rent of an annual payment of one rose, and suit at his father's court. In 1354, Henry, Duke of Lancaster granted Harrington a lease of a manor in Hornby; Harrington already held Bolton-le-Moors, Chorley, and Aighton, jure uxoris. He died on 1 August 1359: his lands passed in quick succession to his eldest son, Robert, to Robert's brother Thomas (who both died in 1361), and thence to his Harrington's youngest son Nicholas.
