= Thomas Lennard, 1st Earl of Sussex =

English peer & cricketer (1654–1715)

The Right Honourable The Earl of Sussex
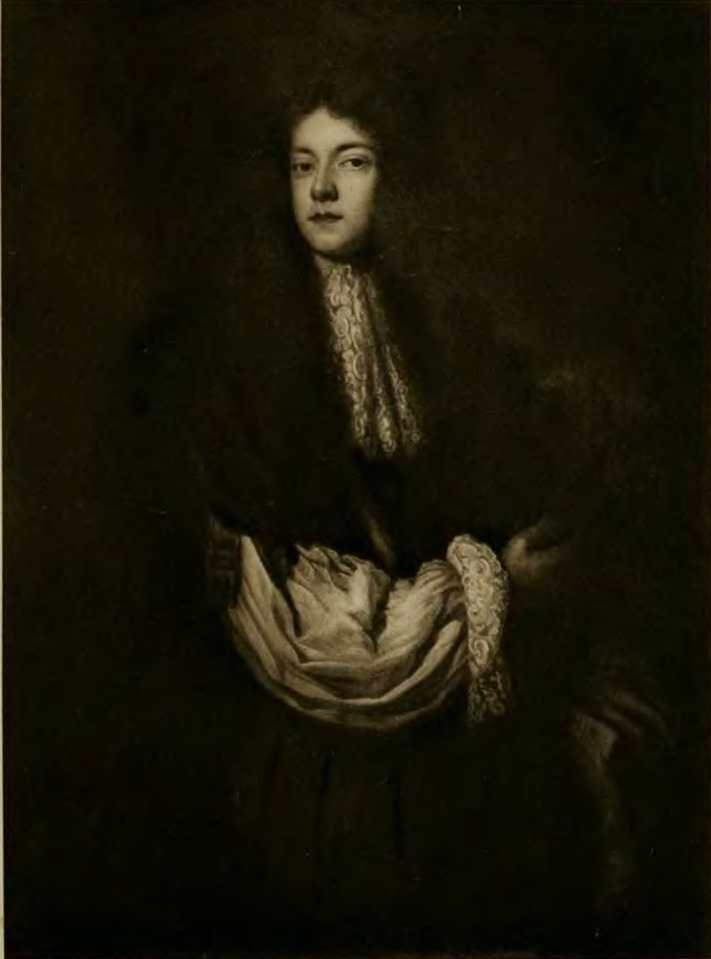
- Portrait of Lennard, ascribed to Willem Wissing
- Born: Thomas Lennard; 13 May 1654
- Died: 30 October 1715 (aged 61)
- Spouse: Lady Anne Fitzroy (m. 1674; died 1715)
- Children: 4
- Parent(s): Francis Lennard, 14th Baron Dacre; Elizabeth Bayning, Countess of Shepey
- Relatives: Paul Bayning, 1st Viscount Bayning (grandfather); Anne Manners, Lady Roos (cousin); Barbara Palmer, 1st Duchess of Cleveland (cousin)

Thomas Lennard, 1st Earl of Sussex, 15th Baron Dacre, (13 May 1654 – 30 October 1715) was an English peer. He became Earl of Sussex in 1674 when he married Lady Anne Fitzroy, illegitimate daughter of Charles II and Lady Barbara Palmer. The Baron Dacre title became abeyant in 1715 following his death.

== Early life ==
Arms of Lennard: Or, on a fess gules three fleurs-de-lys of the field

He was the son of Francis Lennard, 14th Baron Dacre (1619–1662) and the former Elizabeth Bayning (1624–1686), who was created suo jure Countess of Sheppey for life in 1680. His father served as MP for Sussex in 1654. Among his siblings were sisters, Elizabeth Lennard (the wife of William Brabazon, 3rd Earl of Meath and the Hon. William Moore) and Philadelphia Lennard (the wife of Daniel O'Brien, 3rd Viscount Clare).

His paternal grandparents were Richard Lennard, 13th Baron Dacre and Elizabeth Throckmorton (a daughter of Sir Arthur Throckmorton, MP for Colchester). His maternal grandparents were Paul Bayning, 1st Viscount Bayning and the former Anne Glemham (a daughter of Sir Henry Glemham). After the 1st Viscount Bayning's death, his grandmother married Dudley Carleton, 1st Viscount Dorchester. Among his maternal family were aunts Anne Bayning (the wife of Henry Murray, a Groom of the Bedchamber to King Charles I), Cecilia Bayning (the wife of Henry Pierrepont, 1st Marquess of Dorchester), and Mary Bayning (the wife of William Villiers, 2nd Viscount Grandison and mother of Barbara Villiers, Duchess of Cleveland).

== Career ==
Upon the death of his father on 12 May 1662, he succeeded as the 15th Baron Dacre. Less than five months after his wedding, he was created 1st Earl of Sussex on 5 October 1674.

=== Cricket ===
Lennard was a supporter of cricket which developed into a major sport during his lifetime. His 1677 accounts include an item which refers to £3 being paid to him when he went to a cricket match being played at "ye Dicker" (sic), which was then a common in the vicinity of Hailsham in East Sussex.

== Personal life ==
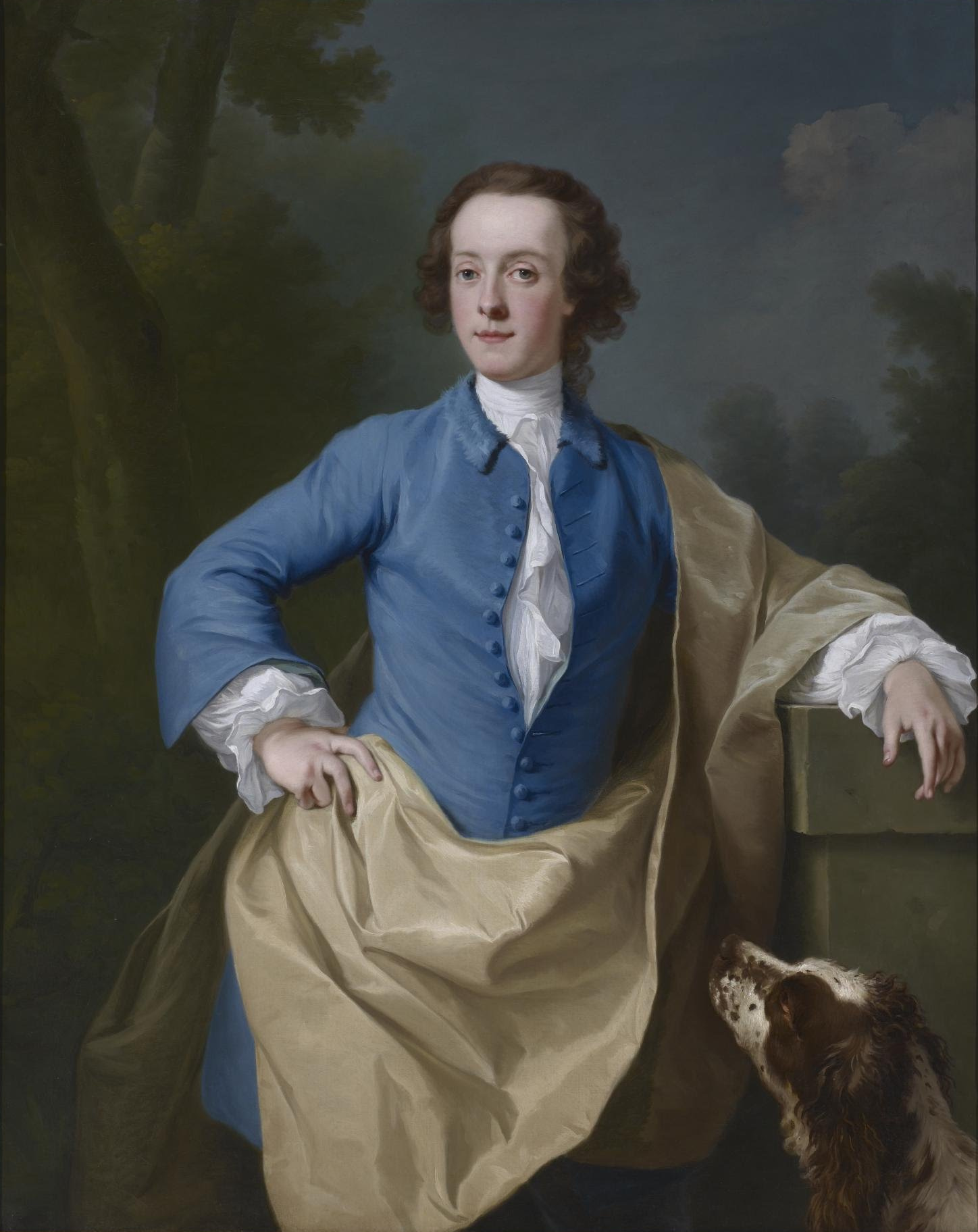
Portrait of his grandson, Thomas Barrett-Lennard, 17th Baron Dacre, by Andrea Soldi

On 16 May 1674, Lord Dacre was married to Lady Anne Fitzroy (1661–1721), the illegitimate daughter of King Charles II and Dacre's first cousin, Barbara Villiers, Duchess of Cleveland. Together, they were the parents of:

- Henry Lennard, who died young.
- Lady Barbara Lennard (1676–1741), who married Lt.-Gen. Charles Skelton.
- Charles Lennard, Lord Dacre (1682–c. 1683), who died young.
- Lady Anne Lennard (1684–1755), who married Richard Barrett (later Barrett-Lennard), son of Dacre Barrett and Lady Jane Chichester (eldest daughter of the 2nd Earl of Donegall), in c. 1716. After his death in 1716, she married Henry Roper, 8th Baron Teynham, in c. March 1717. After his death in 1723, she married Hon. Robert Moore, son of Henry Hamilton-Moore, 3rd Earl of Drogheda, in 1725.

Lord Sussex died on 30 October 1715. On his death, his earldom became extinct and his barony fell into abeyance between his two daughters. After Lady Barbara's death in 1741, the abeyance was terminated in favor of his younger daughter Anne, who became suo jure 16th Baroness Dacre.

=== Descendants ===
Through his daughter Anne, he was a grandfather of Thomas Barrett-Lennard, 17th Baron Dacre (1717–1786), Hon. Anna Maria Roper (1719–1782), Hon. Charles Roper (1721–1754), and the Rev. Hon. Richard Henry Roper (1723–1810).

== Bibliography ==
- McCann, Tim (2004). Sussex Cricket in the Eighteenth Century. Sussex Record Society.

Peerage of England
New creation	Earl of Sussex; 4th creation 1674–1715	Extinct
Preceded by Francis Lennard	Baron Dacre; 1st creation 1662–1715	In abeyance Title next held by Anne Barrett-Lennard
