= Henry Hamilton-Moore, 3rd Earl of Drogheda =

Anglo-Irish peer and soldier

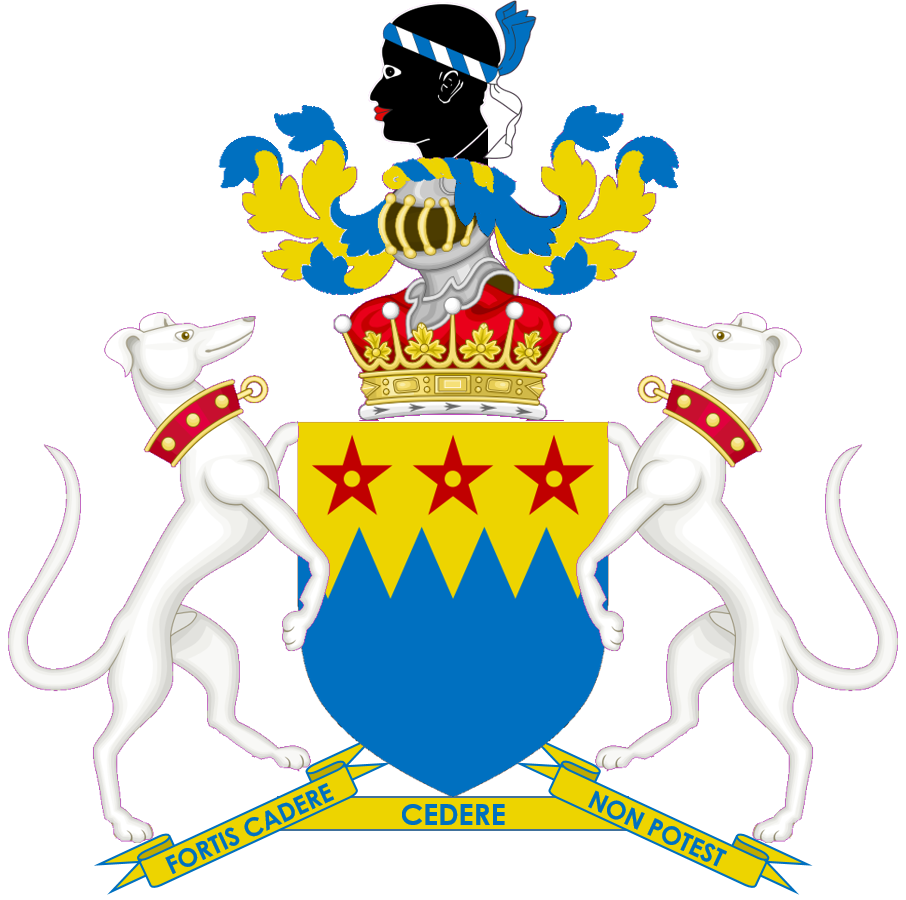

Henry Hamilton-Moore, 3rd Earl of Drogheda PC (Ire) (died 7 June 1714) was an Anglo-Irish peer and soldier.

== Early life ==
He was born Henry Moore as a younger son of Henry Moore, 1st Earl of Drogheda (d. 1675) and Hon. Alice Spencer. His elder brother, Charles, married Lady Letitia Isabella Robartes (eldest daughter of 1st Earl of Radnor). Among his siblings were Hon. William Moore (who married Lady Elizabeth Brabazon, widow of the 3rd Earl of Meath and daughter of the 14th Lord Dacre and Elizabeth Bayning, suo jure Countess of Sheppey), Lady Alice Moore (wife of the 2nd Earl of Clanbrassil and the 2nd Lord Bargeny), and Lady Mary Moore (wife of the 3rd Earl of Dalhousie and the 2nd Lord Bellenden).

His paternal grandparents were Charles Moore, 2nd Viscount Moore of Drogheda, and the Hon. Alice Loftus (youngest daughter of the 1st Viscount Loftus). His uncle was Henry Spencer, 1st Earl of Sunderland, and his maternal grandparents were William Spencer, 2nd Baron Spencer and Lady Penelope Wriothesley (eldest daughter of the 3rd Earl of Southampton).

== Career ==
Upon the death of his brother on 18 June 1679, he succeeded as the title of 3rd Earl of Drogheda, a title that had been created for his father in the Peerage of Ireland in 1661. He also succeeded to his family's subsidiary titles, as the 5th Baron Moore of Mellefont (which had been created for his great-grandfather, Garret Moore, in 1616) and the 5th Viscount Moore (created in 1622, also for his great-grandfather Garret). On the death of his sister, the Dowager Countess of Clanbrassil, who had devised upon him the Hamilton family estates in her will, he assumed the additional surname of Hamilton in 1677.

He was appointed Privy Counsellor for Ireland in 1680. From 1689 to 1698, he was Colonel of a Regiment of Foot. He was attainted in his absence by the Irish Parliament of King James II in 1689, against whom he fought at the Battles of the Boyne and Limerick on the side of King William III. From 1696 to 1697 and, again, from 1701 to 1702, he served as a Lord Justice of Ireland. In 1699, he was Commissioner for forfeited estates. He also served as Governor of Meath and Louth.

== Personal life ==
On 3 July 1675, he married Mary Cole (d. 1726), daughter of Sir John Cole, 1st Baronet and Elizabeth Chichester (a daughter of Hon. John Chichester MP, second son of the 1st Viscount Chichester, and of Hon. Mary Jones, a daughter of the 1st Viscount Ranelagh).. Mary was also a sister of Arthur Cole, 1st Baron Ranelagh. Together, they were the parents of:

- Charles Moore, Viscount Moore (1676–1714), MP for Drogheda who married Hon. Jane Loftus, only daughter and heiress of Arthur Loftus, 3rd Viscount Loftus.
- Hon. Henry Moore, the Rector of Malpas and Wilmslow who married Catherine (née Knatchbull) Rooke, widow of Vice-Admiral Sir George Rooke and only daughter of Sir Thomas Knatchbull, 3rd Baronet.
- Hon. John Moore (d. 1716), who married Elizabeth (née Porter) Devenish, widow of Edward Devenish of Lincoln's Inn, and youngest daughter of Sir Charles Porter, Lord Chancellor of Ireland, in 1708.
- Hon. William Moore (d. 1732), who married Lucy Parkinson, daughter of Rev. Edward Parkinson, of Ardee, in 1717.
- Hon. Robert Moore (1688–1762), MP for County Louth and Belfast who married, as her third husband, Lady Anne Lennard, suo jure Baroness Dacre, in 1725. The eldest surviving daughter and heiress of Thomas Lennard, 1st Earl of Sussex and Lady Anne FitzRoy (eldest illegitimate daughter of King Charles II), Anne was the widow of Richard Barrett-Lennard and Henry Roper, 8th Baron Teynham.
- Hon. Capel Moore, who married Lady Mary O'Neill, widow of Charles O'Neill, of Shane's Castle and eldest daughter of Charles Paulet, 2nd Duke of Bolton.
- Lady Alice Moore (d. c. 1750), who married Sir Gustavus Hume, 3rd Baronet.
- Lady Elizabeth Moore, who married George Rochfort, MP for County Westmeath, in 1704.

Lord Drogheda died on 7 June 1714 and was succeeded in his titles by his grandson, Henry, as his eldest son, Charles, predeceased him. His widow, the dowager Countess of Drogheda, died on 6 May 1726.

Peerage of Ireland
Preceded by Charles Moore	Earl of Drogheda; 1679–1714	Succeeded by Henry Moore
