= Anne Lennard, Countess of Sussex =

Illegitimate daughter of Charles II of England

The Right Honourable The Countess of Sussex
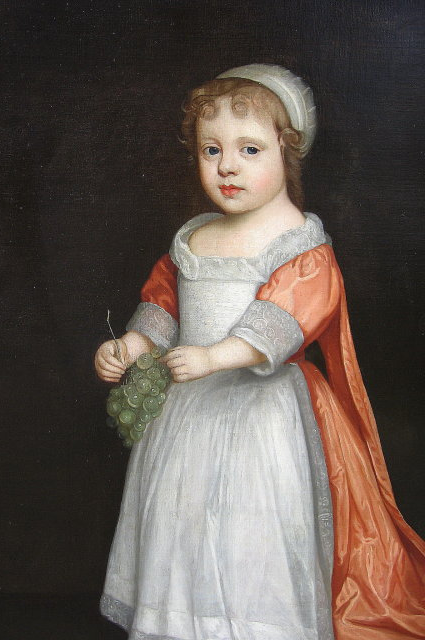
- Portrait of Anne Lennard by court painter Sir Peter Lely, circa 1665.
- Born: Anne Palmer; 25 February 1661; Westminster, England
- Died: 16 May 1721 or 1722 (aged 60 or 61); England
- Resting place: St Peter and St Paul New Churchyard, Lynsted, Swale Borough, Kent, United Kingdom
- Occupation: Courtier
- Spouse: Thomas Lennard, 1st Earl of Sussex (m. 1674; died 1715)
- Children: Barbara; Charles; Henry; Anne
- Parent(s): Charles II of England (disputed); Barbara Palmer, 1st Duchess of Cleveland

Anne Lennard, Countess of Sussex (née Palmer; 25 February 1661 – 16 May 1721 or 1722), formerly Lady Anne FitzRoy, was the eldest daughter of Barbara Villiers, mistress to King Charles II. She became the wife of Thomas Lennard, 1st Earl of Sussex.

== Life ==
Born Lady Anne Palmer in Westminster, she was the first child of Barbara Villiers, the only child of William Villiers, 2nd Viscount Grandison, and the wife of Roger Palmer, 1st Earl of Castlemaine. Anne's mother was one of the mistresses of King Charles II. According to legend, Anne was conceived on the night of Charles's coronation. This cannot be true as she was born two months earlier, but she must have been conceived about the date on which Charles assumed the throne at the Restoration. Both Villiers and the king acknowledged Anne as his daughter, and she was therefore known by the alias of Fitzroy, meaning "son of the king," but she has also been suggested as the daughter of Philip Stanhope, 2nd Earl of Chesterfield, "whom," says Lord Dartmouth, "she resembled very much both in face and person."

On 11 August 1674, at the age of thirteen, Lady Anne was married at Hampton Court to her second cousin 15th Baron Dacre, a Gentleman of the Bedchamber to the King. On the same day her ten-year-old sister Lady Charlotte Fitzroy was contracted to Sir Edward Lee (raised from an early baronetcy to the Earldom of Lichfield two months before, and also a Gentleman of the King's Bedchamber). Both the wedding and her dowry were paid for by Charles II. Dacre was subsequently created Earl of Sussex.

In the summer of 1678, Lady Sussex eloped from a convent in Paris with Ralph Montagu (afterwards 1st Duke of Montagu). He was successively the lover of mother and daughter (the Duchess of Cleveland and Lady Sussex). In a letter to King Charles, dated "Paris, Tuesday the 28th, 1678," her mother wrote:

I was never so surprised in my whole life-time as I was at my coming hither, to find my Lady Sussex gone from my house and monastery where I left her, and this letter from her, which I here send you the copy of. I never in my whole life-time heard of such government of herself as she has had since I went into England. She has never been in the monastery two days together, but every day gone out with the Ambassador (Ralph Montagu), and has often lain four days together at my house, and sent for her meat to the Ambassador; he being always with her till five o'clock in the morning, they two shut up together alone, and would not let my maitre d'hôtel wait, nor any of my servants, only the Ambassador's. This has made so great a noise at Paris, that she is now the whole discourse. I am so much afflicted that I can hardly write this for crying, to see a child, that I doted on as I did on her, should make me so ill a return, and join with the worst of men to ruin me.

Anne had a lesbian affair with her father's mistress, Hortense Mancini. This culminated in a friendly fencing match in St James's Park, with the women clad in nightgowns. After that, the Earl of Sussex ordered his wife to leave the country. There she refused to do anything but lie in bed, repeatedly kissing a miniature of Hortense.

Anne's husband the Earl of Sussex was a "popular but extravagant man" who, by extravagance and losses by gambling, had to sell the estate of Herstmonceaux and others. Lord and Lady Sussex separated in 1688, and she was widowed in 1715. The dowager countess of Sussex died 16 May 1721 or 1722, and was buried at Linsted, County Kent.

== Issue ==
The children of her union with Sussex were two sons, who died in infancy; and two daughters, who lived to adulthood, co-heirs of the Barony of Dacre:

1. Barbara Lennard (12 July 1676, Westminster, London – 1741, Paris), married Charles Skelton, Esq., Lieutenant-General in the French service, and Grand Croix de St. Louis. Died without issue.
2. Charles Lennard, Lord Dacre (25 May 1682, Windsor Castle – 13 March 1684)
3. Henry Lennard: born about 1683 at Herstmonceaux, Sussex; died in infancy.
4. Anne Lennard (17 August 1684, Sussex – 26 June 1755, London), 16th Baroness Dacre in her own right. Married four times;

(1) First, to Richard Barrett-Lennard, Esq. (died 1716), son of Dacre Barrett-Lennard and his wife Jane, eldest daughter of Arthur Chichester, the second Earl of Donegal. Died a few months after his marriage to the Lady Anne in 1716, leaving his wife with child. Their son was Thomas Barrett-Lennard, 17th Baron Dacre (1717 – 12 January 1786), who died without legitimate issue.
(2) Secondly, to Henry Roper, 8th Baron Teynham (died 16 May 1723). Had, among other children, Charles, who m. Gertrude, sister and co-heir of John Trevor, esq. of Glynde, in Sussex, and left at his decease, in 1754,

Charles Trevor-Roper, 18th Baron Dacre (1745–1794). Died without issue, and the title devolved upon his nephew.
Gertrude (d. 3 October 1819), who succeeded her brother, as Baroness Dacre. The Hon. Gertrude Roper m. Thomas Brand, esq. of the Hoo, in the county of Herts; by whom she had issue,

Thomas, 20th Baron Dacre
Gertrude.
Henry, C.B., major-general in the army, who distinguished himself during the war in Spain.

(second son) Henry Brand, 1st Viscount Hampden.

(3) Thirdly, to Hon. Robert Moore (d. 1728), fifth son of Henry Hamilton-Moore, 3rd Earl of Drogheda, in London, by whom she had one son, Henry.
(4) Fourth, to Joseph Williams by whom she had one son, Jeremiah Williams
