= Ralph Dacre, 3rd Baron Dacre =

English noble and clergyman

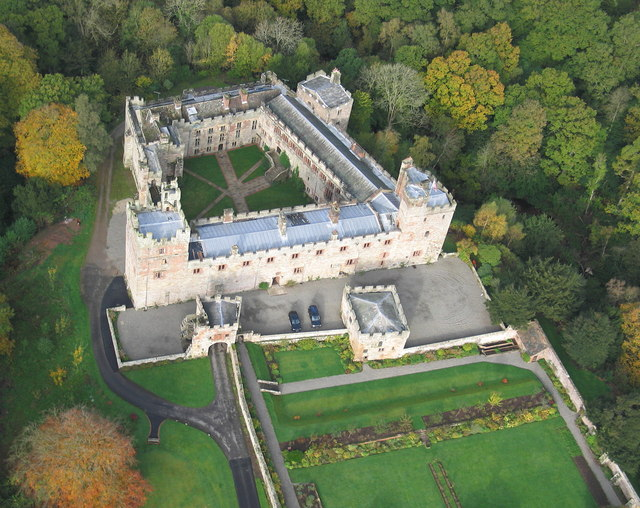
- Naworth Castle, seat of the Dacre family
- Died: 1375
- Noble family: Dacre
- Father: Ralph Dacre, 1st Baron Dacre
- Mother: Margaret de Multon, 2nd Baroness Multon of Gilsland

Ralph Dacre, 3rd Baron Dacre (died 1375) was an English noble and clergyman. He was the third son of Ralph Dacre, 1st Baron Dacre and his wife Margaret de Multon, 2nd Baroness Multon of Gilsland, with two older brothers (William and Thomas) and one younger brother (Hugh). He would become the second of three of the brothers to succeed to the title of Baron Dacre.

As the third son, Ralph Dacre pursued a clerical career. He was placed as the rector of the church of Prescot in 1346 (while still several months below canonical age), and was confirmed in this position in 1350 by Pope Clement VI. He is mentioned as "parson of Prescot" in visitation pedigrees, and he retained his position as rector until shortly before his death in 1375, when he resigned in favour of John Fairfax.

Ralph Dacre succeeded to the title of Baron Dacre in 1361, on the death of his eldest brother William without issue (the next-oldest brother, Thomas, also being dead without issue before this time). He was summoned to Parliament in 1362. His time as baron was turbulent, with a particularly violent feud developing that would ultimately claim his life. In 1373, Nicholas Harrington led an armed party against Dacre's lands that caused extensive damage, including the destruction of buildings and the theft of cattle and other valuables.

Ralph Dacre died intestate, unmarried, and childless in 1375. His brother Hugh succeeded him as the fourth Baron Dacre.

Peerage of England
| Preceded by William Dacre | Baron Dacre; 1361–1375 | Succeeded by Hugh Dacre |
