= Charles Moore, Viscount Moore =

The Honourable Charles Moore (baptised 1 December 1676 – 21 May 1714), styled Viscount Moore, was a Member of the Irish Parliament for Drogheda.

== Early life ==
Moore was baptised 1 December 1676. He was the eldest son, and heir apparent, of Henry Hamilton-Moore, 3rd Earl of Drogheda and Mary Cole (d. 1726). Among his siblings were brother Robert Moore and sisters, Lady Alice Moore (wife of Sir Gustavus Hume, 3rd Baronet) and Lady Elizabeth Moore (wife of George Rochfort, MP for County Westmeath).

His paternal grandparents were Henry Moore, 1st Earl of Drogheda and Hon. Alice Spencer (sister of the 1st Earl of Sunderland, and younger daughter of the 2nd Baron Spencer). His maternal grandparents were Sir John Cole, 1st Baronet and Elizabeth Chichester (a daughter of Hon. John Chichester, MP, second son of the 1st Viscount Chichester). Among his extended family was uncle, Arthur Cole, 1st Baron Ranelagh.

== Career ==
Lord Moore was a Member of the Irish House of Commons for Drogheda from 1692 to 1699 and, again, from 1703 to 1713.

As the heir apparent to the earldom of Drogheda, he was styled Viscount Moore. Moore predeceased his father, however, so the earldom passed to his eldest son, Henry, in 1714.

== Personal life ==
On 24 August 1699, Moore married Hon. Jane Loftus (d. 1713), only daughter and heiress of Arthur Loftus, 3rd Viscount Loftus, and, his second wife, Anne (née Hawkins) Owens, widow of Sir Andrew Owens and daughter of William Hawkins. Before his death, they were the parents of:

- Henry Moore, 4th Earl of Drogheda (1700–1727), who married Hon. Charlotte Boscawen, second daughter of Hugh Boscawen, 1st Viscount Falmouth, and Charlotte Godfrey (eldest daughter and co-heirss of Col. Charles Godfrey, Master of the Jewel Office, and Arabella Churchill, a mistress of King James II, sister of John Churchill, 1st Duke of Marlborough), in c. 1719.
- Edward Moore, 5th Earl of Drogheda (1701–1758), who married Lady Sarah Ponsonby, eldest daughter of Brabazon Ponsonby, 1st Earl of Bessborough, in 1727. After her death in c. 1736, he married Bridget Southwell, daughter of William Southwell, Governor of Monjuich, in 1737.

Lord Moore died on 21 May 1714.
