= Carrickfergus and Belfast (constituency) =

Constituency in Ireland

Carrickfergus and Belfast was a constituency in Ireland, that returned a single Member of Parliament to sit in the House of Commons of the Commonwealth of England, Scotland and Ireland.

It was represented in the three Protectorate Parliaments, between 1654 and 1659.

== Representation and Electorate ==
Ireland was united with England and Scotland under a republican government, after the defeat of the Royalists in the English Civil War and related conflicts, which had affected all three kingdoms.

Under the Instrument of Government, of 15 December 1653, the Lord Protector and the English Council of State were given power to provide for Irish representatives in the Westminster Parliament.

Provision for thirty Members of Parliament was made by An Ordinance by the Protector for Elections in Ireland of 27 June 1654. Carrickfergus and Belfast was one of the constituencies established by the Ordinance. The place of election was at Belfast.

Belfast was a borough, which had been enfranchised in 1613. According to Samuel Lewis in A Topographical Dictionary of Ireland in Parliament of Ireland elections the voters were the free burgess members of the corporation (the local Council). This group numbered twelve in the 18th century, although many Irish boroughs had larger corporations in earlier times than in the 18th century.

Carrickfergus, one of the oldest Parliamentary boroughs in Ireland, was a county of itself. This was a status similar to the later County Boroughs. The town had been enfranchised in 1326, before County Antrim existed as a sub-division of Ireland and Carrickfergus was included in that geographical county (but not for the purposes of administration). In Irish Parliament elections it was one of the few boroughs with a fairly large electorate. According to Samuel Lewis in A Topographical Dictionary of Ireland it consisted of the mayor, aldermen, burgesses, and freemen of the town as well as the freeholders of land valued at 40 shillings per annum or more.

== Boundaries and boundary changes ==
The constituency comprised the County Antrim boroughs of Belfast and Carrickfergus.

Both before and after the Commonwealth, Belfast (Parliament of Ireland constituency) and Carrickfergus (Parliament of Ireland constituency) each sent two members to the Parliament of Ireland.

== Parliaments in which the constituency was represented ==
=== First Protectorate Parliament ===
The First Protectorate Parliament was summoned by the Lord Protector Oliver Cromwell under the terms of the Instrument of Government. It sat for one term from 3 September 1654 until 22 January 1655 with William Lenthall as the Speaker of the House.

=== Second Protectorate Parliament ===
The Second Protectorate Parliament sat for two sessions from 17 September 1656 until 4 February 1658 with Thomas Widdrington as the Speaker of the House.

=== Third Protectorate Parliament ===
The Third Protectorate Parliament sat for one session from 27 January 1659 until 22 April 1659 with Chaloner Chute and Thomas Bampfield as the Speakers of the House.

== See also ==
- List of Irish constituencies
- Irish House of Commons
