= Listed buildings in Burtholme =

Burtholme is a civil parish in the Cumberland district in Cumbria, England. It contains eleven listed buildings that are recorded in the National Heritage List for England. Of these, six are listed at Grade I, the highest of the three grades, and the others are at Grade II, the lowest grade. The parish includes the villages of Lanercost and Banks, and is otherwise rural. Historically, the most important building in the parish was Lanercost Priory. Following the Dissolution of the Monasteries, parts of the priory buildings have been converted for other uses, and these comprise five of the listed buildings in the parish. The other listed buildings include a medieval cross base, houses, farmhouses, and farm buildings.

== Key ==
Grade	Criteria
I	Buildings of exceptional interest, sometimes considered to be internationally important
II	Buildings of national importance and special interest

== Buildings ==
Name and location	Photograph	Date	Notes	Grade
Cross base 54.96638°N 2.69544°W		1214	The cross is in sandstone. It consists of a stepped plinth, a chamfered square socket stone, and a fragment of a shaft. The shaft has dog-tooth decoration and an inscription. Part of the shaft has been incorporated in the north aisle of the church.	I
Dacre Hall; 54.96595°N 2.69532°W		Early 13th century	Originally the west range of the cloisters of Lanercost Priory, and later converted into a church hall. It was altered in 1559, and again in the early 19th century. The building is in red sandstone and calciferous sandstone, mainly from the Roman wall, and has a green slate roof. It is in two storeys and has five bays. Most of the windows are mullioned.	I
Gateway arch 54.96619°N 2.69728°W		Early 13th century	This was originally part of the gate tower of Lanercost Priory. It is built in red sandstone and calciferous sandstone from the Roman wall. It is a chamfered segmental arch, with a hood mould, moulded corbel stops, and fragments of fan vaulting. At the rear are flanking buttresses.	I
St Mary's Church; 54.96612°N 2.69513°W		Early 13th century	The church has been developed from the nave of Lanercost Priory. It is built in red sandstone and calciferous sandstone from the Roman wall, and has a green slate roof. The church has a chamfered plinth, string courses, buttresses and a dentilled moulded cornice, and consists of a nave with a clerestory and a north aisle.	I
Vicarage; 54.96594°N 2.69582°W	—	Early 13th century	The vicarage has been developed from the former guest house of the outer court of Lanercost Priory. It was altered in the 16th century, in 1850–51 by Anthony Salvin, and from 1873 by C. J. Ferguson. It is built in red sandstone and calciferous sandstone from the Roman wall, and has roofs of slate or sandstone slate. To the left is a three-storey, single-bay tower. Most of the windows are mullioned and transformed. Inside the vicarage is a spiral staircase.	I
North walls, Lanercost Priory; 54.96686°N 2.69539°W	—	13th century	The wall to the north of the priory and the graveyard is in mixed red sandstone and calciferous sandstone from the Roman wall. There is an entrance for a footpath with a chamfered surround. The graveyard wall, dating probably from the 18th century, adjoins the north transept, and is built in material from the demolished priory.	I
Barn, Abbey Farm; 54.96573°N 2.69578°W	—	Mid 16th century	The barn originated as the west range of a house. The barn is built in mixed red sandstone and calciferous sandstone from Lanercost Priory, and has a roof of sandstone slate with coped gables. It is a long barn in two storeys.	II
Holmehead; 54.96768°N 2.67366°W	—	Late 16th or early 17th century	Originally a bastle house, it was altered in the 19th century. The building has extremely thick stone walls and a Welsh slate roof. There are two storeys and three bays, with a recessed bay to the right. The doorway has a chamfered surround, and most of the windows are sashes. Above the doorway is a gabled dormer with a casement window.	II
Bell's Cottage; 54.97404°N 2.67711°W	—	Late 17th century	The house is built in stone from the Roman wall, and has a roof of Welsh slate with coped gables. There are two storeys and three bays. The windows include chamfered mullioned windows, fire windows, windows from later dates, and some blocked windows. Inside the house is a bressumer.	II
Banks Foot and outbuildings 54.97202°N 2.68092°W	—	Late 18th or early 19th century	The farmhouse and outbuildings are in red sandstone and calciferous sandstone and have Welsh slate roofs. The house is in two storeys with three bays, and has quoins, and a cornice. The doorway has a fanlight, a quoined surround and an entablature with a keystone. The windows are sashes in plain surrounds, and at the rear is a round-headed stair window. The outbuildings form an L-shaped plan to the right, and include a hexagonal gin gang with a hipped green slate roof.	II
St Mary's Vale; 54.96537°N 2.68178°W	—	Early 19th century	A stuccoed house on a squared plinth with a hipped green slate roof. There are two storeys and three bays, flanked by single-bay extensions. On the front, the door and the sash windows have plain surrounds, and at the rear the windows are casements.	II
