= Baron Dacre =

Title in the Peerage of England

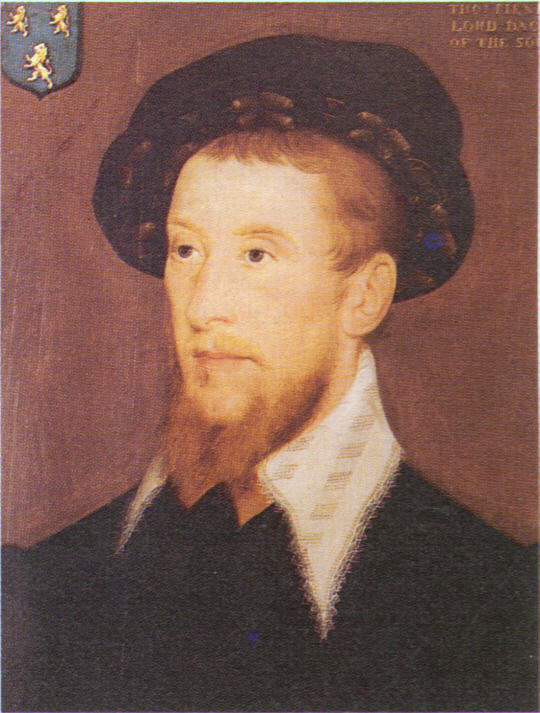
Thomas Fiennes, 9th Baron Dacre. Executed in 1541, when title was forfeit. Arms of Fiennes, Barons Dacre: Azure, three lions rampant or.

Baron Dacre is a title that has been created three times in the Peerage of England, each time by writ.

== History ==
The first creation came in 1321, when Ralph Dacre was summoned to Parliament as Lord Dacre. He married Margaret, 2nd Baroness Multon of Gilsland, heiress of a large estate in Cumbria centred on Naworth Castle and lands in North Yorkshire around what is now Castle Howard. However, the status of the Multon barony is uncertain after Margaret's death in 1361. Lord Dacre's younger son, the third Baron, was murdered in 1375. He was succeeded by his younger brother, the fourth Baron. The latter's grandson was Thomas Dacre, the sixth Baron.

The second creation was when the sixth Baron's second son (Ralph Dacre) was summoned to Parliament as Lord Dacre (of Gilsland) in 1459 (see below). However, this new creation became extinct on his death in 1461, having been killed at the Battle of Towton and buried in the churchyard of nearby All Saints' Church, Saxton, Yorkshire, where survives his inscribed chest tomb. It's alleged that he was buried with his horse and the vertebrae of a horse was found extending into Dacre’s grave during the 19th century.

The third creation was when the sixth Baron's third son (Humphrey Dacre) was summoned to Parliament as Lord Dacre (of Gilsland) in 1482 (for more information on this creation, see below).

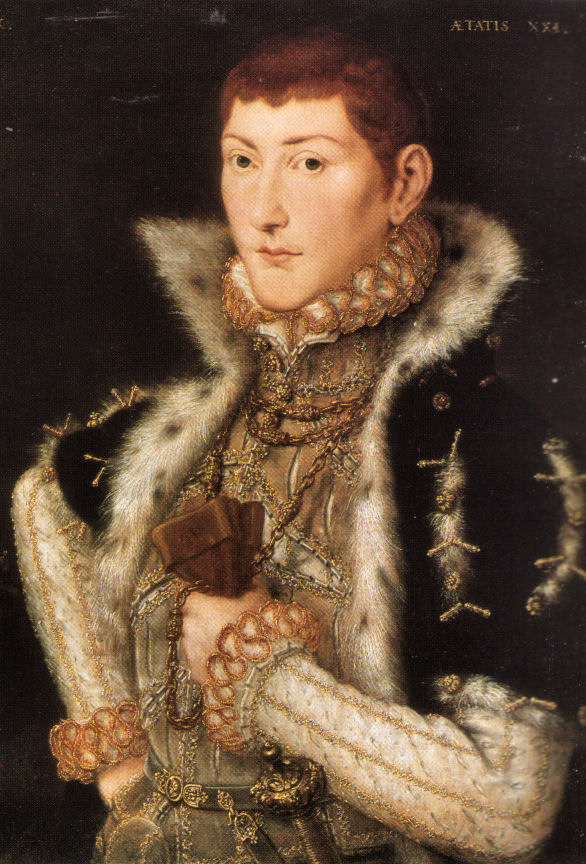
Gregory Fiennes, 10th Baron Dacre (1539–94), son of the 9th Baron Dacre. He was restored to the title in 1558. Portrait by Hans Eworth (detail).

The sixth Baron was succeeded by his granddaughter Joan, the seventh Baroness, the only surviving child of the sixth Baron's eldest son Sir Thomas Dacre (1410–1448). She was the wife of Sir Richard Fiennes of Herstmonceux Castle, Sussex. Richard was summoned to Parliament in 1459 as Lord Dacre in right of his wife.

Thus after Thomas Dacre's death in 1458, there were two lines of Barons Dacre simultaneously, confirmed by King Edward IV. One line descending from his deceased eldest son's daughter which were known as his "heirs general" and were the Fiennes peers, seated in Herstmonceux Castle, Sussex. They were known as "Baron Dacre of the South". As his first and second sons were deceased, the second line of Dacres descended from his third son, Humphrey, and were known as his "heirs male". They were seated at Naworth Castle and Gilsland in Cumberland and were known as "Baron Dacre of the North". This distinction came to an end in 1569, when the Gilsland title became abeyant due to George Dacre, 5th Baron Dacre dying in an accident as a child. His sisters inherited the Dacre properties in the north of England which then came under the control of the Duke of Norfolk following their marriages into the Howard family. From 1569 onwards, the title of Baron Dacre simply continued in the Sussex line until the 17th century when the title of Baron Dacre of Gilsland was recreated for Charles Howard (see further below for details).

The great-great-grandson of the 7th Baroness, the ninth Baron, was a member of the jury at the trial of Anne Boleyn in 1536 and in 1537 attended the baptism of Prince Edward and bore the canopy at Queen Jane's funeral. However in 1541 he went on an illegal night-time hunting party to kill deer with others. During this escapade, a gamekeeper saw them and in the ensuing melee the gamekeeper was killed. Despite initially pleading not guilty he and his companions were persuaded to plead guilty and, as they were royal favourites, throw themselves upon the king's mercy in the hope of a reprieve. However this did not happen and Fiennes was convicted of murder and executed, whereupon his title was forfeited. However, his son Gregory was restored to the title in 1558. He was succeeded by his sister Margaret, the eleventh Baroness, the wife of Sampson Lennard. Their great-grandson, the fourteenth Baron, married Elizabeth Bayning, daughter of Paul Bayning, first Viscount Bayning of Sudbury, who in 1674 (after the title had become extinct) was created Viscountess Bayning for life.

Their son, Thomas Lennard, 15th Baron Dacre, was created Earl of Sussex in 1674. He married Anne Fitzroy, eldest daughter of Barbara Villiers, mistress to King Charles II. However, his earldom became extinct on his death in 1715, while the barony of Dacre fell into abeyance between his two daughters, Barbara and Anne. When Barbara died childless in 1741, the abeyance was terminated the same year in favour of Anne, the 16th Baroness. She was married three times, firstly to Richard Barrett, secondly to Henry Roper, 8th Baron Teynham, and thirdly to the Hon. Robert Moore, son of Henry Hamilton-Moore, 3rd Earl of Drogheda (younger son of the first Earl of Drogheda).

The 16th Baroness was succeeded by Thomas Lennard, the 17th Baron, her son from her first marriage. He died without legitimate issue and was succeeded by his nephew, the 18th Baron. He was the son of the Hon. Charles Roper, son of the late Lady Dacre's second marriage to Lord Teynham (the barony of Teynham had been passed on to a son from an earlier marriage of Lord Teynham). On his death, the title passed to his sister Gertrude, the 19th Baroness. She was the wife of Thomas Brand.

Arms of Lennard: Or, on a fess gules three fleurs-de-lys of the field

Arms of Roper: Per fesse azure and or, a pale counter-changed and three buck's heads erased of the second

The 19th Baroness was succeeded by her son, the 20th Baron. He notably represented Hertfordshire in the House of Commons. His younger brother, the 21st Baron, was a General in the Army. In 1824 he assumed by Royal licence the surname of Trevor in lieu of Brand. He was succeeded by his eldest son, the 22nd Baron. He sat as Member of Parliament for Hertfordshire and also served as Lord Lieutenant of Essex. When he died, the title passed to his younger brother, the former Speaker of the House of Commons, Henry Brand, 1st Viscount Hampden, who became the 23rd Baron Dacre as well.

The barony remained a subsidiary title of the viscountcy until the death of his great-grandson, the fourth Viscount and 26th Baron, in 1965. The fourth Viscount was succeeded in the viscountcy by his younger brother while, the barony fell into abeyance between his two surviving daughters, the Hon. Rachel Leila Douglas-Home and the Hon. Tessa Mary Thompson. The abeyance was terminated in 1970 in favour of the elder daughter, the 27th holder of the title. She married the Hon. William Douglas-Home, second son of Charles Cospatrick Archibald Douglas-Home, 13th Earl of Home, and younger brother of Prime Minister Alec Douglas-Home. As of 2017 the title is held by her granddaughter, the 29th Baroness, who succeeded her father in 2014.

As mentioned above, the second creation of the barony came in 1459 in favour of Ralph Dacre, second son of the sixth Baron of the first creation, and became extinct on his death in 1461. The third creation came in 1482 in favour of Humphrey Dacre, third son of the sixth Baron of the first creation. This title fell into abeyance on the death of the fifth Baron in 1569. In 1651 the title of Baron Dacre of Gilsland was recreated for Charles Howard, who was made Earl of Carlisle at the same time. He was the great-grandson of Elizabeth Dacre, daughter of the 4th Baron Dacre of the 1482 creation. For more information on this creation, see Earl of Carlisle.

The noted historian Hugh Trevor-Roper, Baron Dacre of Glanton, was the great-great-great-grandson of the Rev. and Hon. Richard Henry Roper, second and youngest son of Anne, 16th Baroness Dacre, from her second marriage to Henry Roper, 8th Baron Teynham. For this reason, he chose Dacre of Glanton as the title of the life peerage which he was awarded in 1979.

Thomas Barrett-Lennard, illegitimate son of Thomas Barrett-Lennard, 17th Baron Dacre, was created a baronet in 1801 (see Barrett-Lennard baronets of Belhus for more information).

== Barons Dacre, first creation (1321) ==
- Ralph Dacre, 1st Baron Dacre (c. 1290–1339), married Margaret de Multon, 2nd Baroness Multon of Gilsland.
- William Dacre, 2nd Baron Dacre (1319–1361)
- Ralph Dacre, 3rd Baron Dacre (1321–1375)
- Hugh Dacre, 4th Baron Dacre (1335–1383)
- William Dacre, 5th Baron Dacre (1357–1398)
- Thomas Dacre, 6th Baron Dacre (1386–1458)

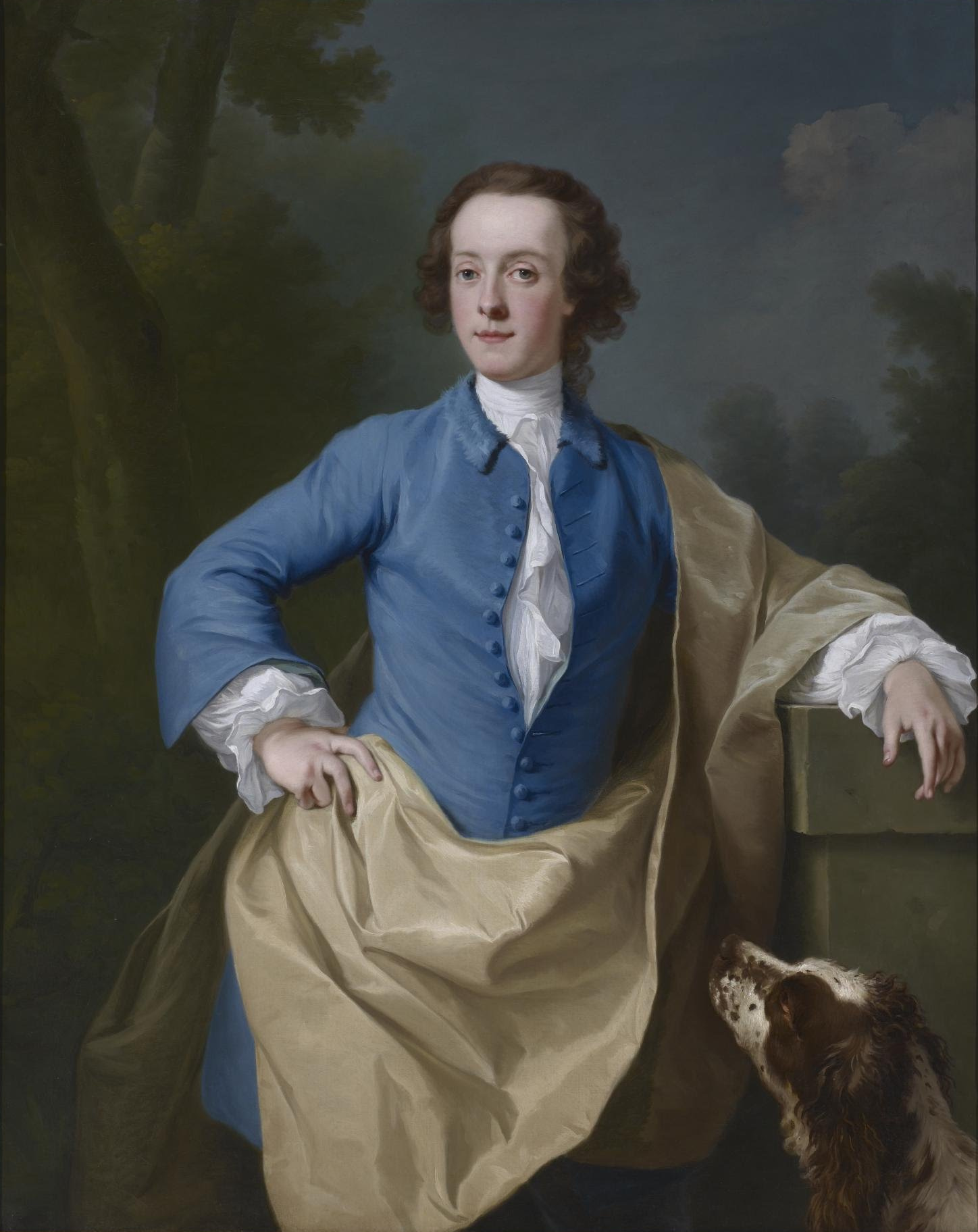
Portrait by Andrea Soldi of Thomas Barrett-Lennard, 17th Baron Dacre (1736-1744)

- Joan Dacre, 7th Baroness Dacre (1433–1486) with:
  - Richard Fiennes, 7th Baron Dacre (jure uxoris) (d. 1483)
- Thomas Fiennes, 8th Baron Dacre (1474–1534)
- Thomas Fiennes, 9th Baron Dacre (d. 1541) (forfeit 1541)
- Gregory Fiennes, 10th Baron Dacre (1558–1594) (restored 1558). His wife Anne (d. 1595), daughter of Richard Sackville, was co-founder of Emanuel School.
- Margaret Fiennes, 11th Baroness Dacre (1541–1612)
- Henry Lennard, 12th Baron Dacre (1570–1616)
- Richard Lennard, 13th Baron Dacre (1596–1630)
- Francis Lennard, 14th Baron Dacre (1619–1662)
- Thomas Lennard, 1st Earl of Sussex, 15th Baron Dacre (1654–1715) (abeyant 1715). He married Lady Anne Palmer.
- Anne Barrett-Lennard, 16th Baroness Dacre (1684–1755) (abeyance terminated 1741)
- Thomas Barrett-Lennard, 17th Baron Dacre (1717–1786)
- Trevor Charles Roper, 18th Baron Dacre (1745–1794)
- Gertrude Brand, 19th Baroness Dacre (1750–1819)
- Thomas Brand, 20th Baron Dacre (1774–1851)
- Henry Otway Trevor, 21st Baron Dacre (1777–1853)
- Thomas Crosbie William Trevor, 22nd Baron Dacre (1808–1890)
- Henry Bouverie William Brand, 1st Viscount Hampden, 23rd Baron Dacre (1814–1892)
- Henry Robert Brand, 2nd Viscount Hampden, 24th Baron Dacre (1841–1906)
- Thomas Walter Brand, 3rd Viscount Hampden, 25th Baron Dacre (1869–1958)
- Thomas Henry Brand, 4th Viscount Hampden, 26th Baron Dacre (1900–1965) (abeyant 1965)
- Rachel Leila Douglas-Home, 27th Baroness Dacre (1929–2012) (abeyance terminated 1970), Became sister-in-law of Prime Minister Alec Douglas-Home.
- James Thomas Archibald Douglas-Home, 28th Baron Dacre (1952–2014)
- Emily Beamish, 29th Baroness Dacre (b. 1983). She is the only child of the 28th Baron and succeeded to the title.

The heir apparent is the present holder's son, the Hon. Arthur James Victor Beamish (b. 2020).

== Ancestry ==
Ancestors of Baron Dacre

8. Charles Douglas-Home, 13th Earl of Home
4. Hon. William Douglas-Home
9. Lady Lillian Lambton
2. James Douglas-Home, 28th Baron Dacre
10. Thomas Brand, 4th Viscount Hampden
5. Rachel Brand, 27th Baroness Dacre
11. Leila Seely
1. Emily Douglas-Home, 29th Baroness Dacre
6. William Stephenson
3. Christine Stephenson

== Barons Dacre (of Gilsland), second creation (1459) ==
- Randolph Dacre, 1st Baron Dacre (d. 1461), killed at the Battle of Towton and buried in the churchyard of nearby All Saints' Church, Saxton, Yorkshire, where his inscribed chest tomb survives.

== Barons Dacre (of Gilsland), third creation (1482) ==
- Humphrey Dacre, 1st Baron Dacre (d. 1485)
- Thomas Dacre, 2nd Baron Dacre (c. 1464–1525)
- William Dacre, 3rd Baron Dacre (1497–1563)
- Thomas Dacre, 4th Baron Dacre (c. 1526–1566)
- George Dacre, 5th Baron Dacre (1561–1569) (abeyant)

== Barons Dacre of Gilsland (1661) ==
- see Earl of Carlisle (1661 creation)

== Baron Dacre of Glanton, life peerage (1979) ==
- Hugh Trevor-Roper, Baron Dacre of Glanton (1914–2003)

== See also ==
- Viscountess Bayning
- Viscount Hampden (1884 creation)
- Baron Teynham
- Barrett-Lennard baronets of Belhus
- Earl of Home
- Earl of Carlisle (1661 creation)
