= Henry Roper, 8th Baron Teynham =

English aristocrat (c.1676–1723)

Henry Roper, 8th Baron Teynham (c. 1676 – 16 May 1723) was an English aristocrat.

== Early life ==
Roper was born c. 1676. He was the son of Christopher Roper, 5th Baron Teynham and Hon. Elizabeth Browne. Both of his elder brothers, John and Christopher, succeeded to their father's barony but died unmarried.

His paternal grandparents were Christopher Roper, 4th Baron Teynham and Philadelphia Knollys (a daughter of Sir Henry Knollys of Grove Place). His maternal grandparents were Francis Browne, 3rd Viscount Montagu and Lady Elizabeth Somerset (a daughter of the 1st Marquess of Worcester).

== Career ==
On 23 September 1699, upon the death of his brother Christopher, Roper succeeded as the 8th Baron Teynham, of Teynham, Kent. He conformed to Church of England. He served as a Gentlemen of the Bedchamber to George I of Great Britain.

== Personal life ==
On 25 January 1703/4, he married Hon. Catherine Smythe, daughter of Philip Smythe, 2nd Viscount Strangford and, his second wife, the former Mary Porter (a daughter of Royalist George Porter). Before her death, they were the parents of:

- Hon. Anne Roper, who married John Webb, a son of Sir John Webb, 3rd Baronet.
- Philip Roper, 9th Baron Teynham (1707–1727), who died unmarried.
- Henry Roper, 10th Baron Teynham (c. 1708–1781), who married Catherine Powell, daughter of John Powell, in 1733. After her death in 1765, he married Ann Brinkhurst, daughter of John Brinkhurst, in 1766. After her death in 1771, he married Elizabeth (née Newport) Davis, widow of Thomas Davis, in 1772.

On 22 January c. 1715, he married Mary Gage, daughter of Sir John Gage, 4th Baronet and Mary Stanley. After her death in c. December 1716, he married Lady Anne Barrett-Lennard (née Lennard), suo jure Baroness Dacre, in March c. 1717. Lady Anne, the widow of her second cousin Richard Barrett-Lennard, was the eldest surviving daughter and heiress of Thomas Lennard, 1st Earl of Sussex and Lady Anne FitzRoy (herself the eldest illegitimate daughter of King Charles II and Barbara Palmer, 1st Duchess of Cleveland). Before his death, they were the parents of:

- Hon. Anna Maria Roper (1719–1782), who married Capt. Peter Tyler.
- Hon. Charles Roper (1721–1754), who married Gertrude Trevor, daughter of John Morley Trevor, in 1744.
- Rev. Hon. Richard Henry Roper (1723–1810), who married Hon. Mary Chetwynd, daughter of William Chetwynd, 3rd Viscount Chetwynd, in 1755. After her death, he married Mary Tenison, daughter of Capt. Thomas Tenison, in 1760.

Lord Teynham died on 16 May 1723, from a self inflicted gunshot. After his death, his widow married Irish MP, Robert Moore, a younger son of the 3rd Earl of Drogheda.

=== Descendants ===
Through his eldest son from his second marriage, Hon. Charles Roper, was the posthumously the grandfather of Trevor Charles Roper, 18th Baron Dacre, and Gertrude Trevor Roper, 19th Baroness Dacre. Through his youngest son from his second marriage, Rev. Richard Henry Roper, he was the great-great-great-grandfather of the historian Hugh Trevor-Roper, Baron Dacre of Glanton.

Peerage of England
Preceded by Christopher Roper	Baron Teynham; 1699–1723	Succeeded by Philip Roper
