= Hugh Dacre, 4th Baron Dacre =

English peer

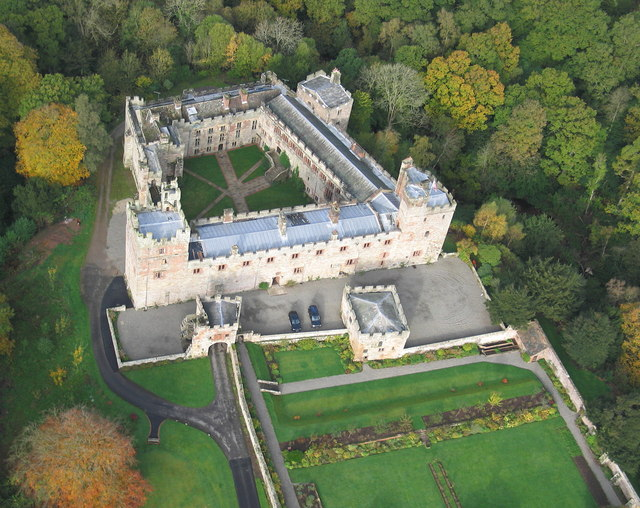
- Naworth Castle, seat of the Dacre family
- Born: 1335
- Died: 1383 (aged 47–48)
- Noble family: Dacre
- Spouse: Ela Maxwell
- Issue: William Dacre, 5th Baron Dacre
- Father: Ralph Dacre, 1st Baron Dacre
- Mother: Margaret de Multon, 2nd Baroness Multon of Gilsland

Hugh Dacre, 4th Baron Dacre (1335–1383) was an English nobleman. He was born in 1335, the youngest son of Ralph Dacre, 1st Baron Dacre and his wife Margaret de Multon, 2nd Baroness Multon of Gilsland. His two older brothers preceded him in the barony, but both died childless. His brother William, the second baron, married but died childless in 1361. His brother Ralph, the third baron, was a clergyman who died unmarried, after being the recipient of a violent feud with another northern family and without issue in 1375.

Dacre, like many noblemen of his time, pursued a military career. He fought in the Hundred Years War in France and Flanders. Upon his return to England, he was one of the commissioners of the Western Marches.

Dacre married Ela (or Elizabeth) Maxwell, said to be the daughter of Alexander Maxwell, of the family that owned Caerlaverock Castle in Scotland. Their son, William succeeded to the barony upon Hugh's death in 1383.

Peerage of England
| Preceded by Ralph Dacre | Baron Dacre; 1375–1383 | Succeeded by William Dacre |
