= Henry Moore, 4th Earl of Drogheda =

Irish peer and rake

The Right Honourable The Earl of Drogheda

Member of Parliament for Camelford
- In office 1722–1727 Serving with William Sloper
- Preceded by: James Montagu; Richard Coffin
- Succeeded by: Sir Thomas Hales; John Pitt

Personal details
- Born: Henry Moore; 7 October 1700
- Died: 29 May 1727 (aged 26)
- Spouse: Hon. Charlotte Boscawen (m. 1720; died 1727)
- Relations: Edward Moore, 5th Earl of Drogheda (brother)
- Children: 1
- Parent(s): Charles Moore, Viscount Moore; Lady Jane Loftus

Henry Moore, 4th Earl of Drogheda (7 October 1700 – 29 May 1727), styled Viscount Moore from 21 May to 7 June 1714, was an Irish peer and rake who briefly served in the Parliament of Great Britain as a Whig. He inherited his title and estates at the age of 13, when his father and grandfather died in quick succession. Drogheda rapidly became a debauchee, and after squandering large sums, died at the age of 26, leaving his younger brother a heavily encumbered estate.

== Early life ==
Moore was the eldest son of Charles Moore, Viscount Moore by his wife Lady Jane Loftus, the daughter of Arthur Loftus, 3rd Viscount Loftus. His father, Charles, was the heir apparent of Henry Hamilton-Moore, 3rd Earl of Drogheda.

Viscount Moore died on 21 May 1714, followed shortly after by his father the 3rd Earl on 7 June, upon which Henry succeeded in the earldom and family estates and quickly became a drunkard.

== Career ==
Sent on the Grand Tour by his guardian, the Dowager Countess of Drogheda, he escaped from his governor in Brussels in June 1717. Proceeding alone to Paris, he returned home when he ran out of money. In 1719, his grandmother obtained a release of responsibility for him from the Lord Chancellor of Ireland, writing that "he exceeds all the youth that ever went before him for wickedness". Drogheda regularly overspent his allowance of £1,500 per year.

Drogheda's father-in-law was the Walpole–Townshend ministry's electoral manager for the Cornish boroughs and obtained for him a seat at Camelford at the 1722 election. In 1725, upon the death of his maternal grandfather Viscount Loftus, he inherited the Loftus estate of Monasterevin.

== Personal life ==
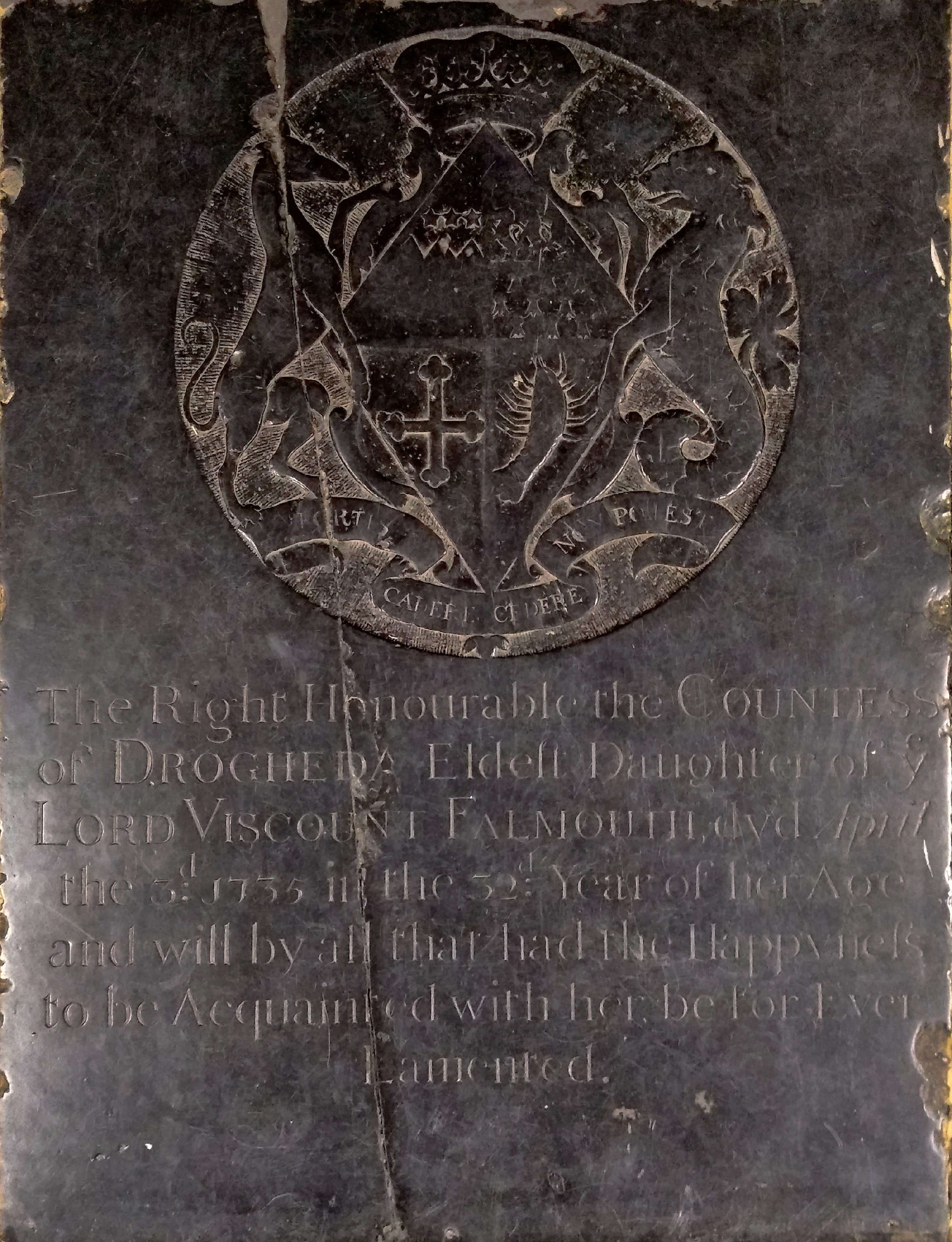
St Mary's Church, Twickenham

In 1720, he married Hon. Charlotte Boscawen, the daughter of Hugh Boscawen, 1st Viscount Falmouth, on 11 February, by whom he had one daughter, who died in infancy. His wife died on 3 April 1735 and is buried in the nave of St Mary's Church, Twickenham next to where the poet Alexander Pope was later buried.

Drogheda continued to spend immense sums on racing and other extravagances and died in Dublin on 29 May 1727. He was succeeded by his brother Edward, who had to sell much of the Moore estates in County Louth to meet Henry's debts of over £180,000; thenceforth the family made their seat at Monasterevin, where they later built Moore Abbey.

Parliament of Great Britain
Preceded by James Montagu; Richard Coffin	Member of Parliament for Camelford; 1722–1727; With: William Sloper	Succeeded by Sir Thomas Hales; John Pitt
Peerage of Ireland
Preceded by Henry Hamilton-Moore	Earl of Drogheda; 1714–1727	Succeeded by Edward Moore
