= Belfast (Parliament of Ireland constituency) =

Pre-1801 Irish constituency

Coordinates: 54.597°N 5.930°W

- Former borough constituency for the Irish House of Commons
- County: County Antrim
- Borough: Belfast

1613–1801
- Seats: 2
- Replaced by: Belfast

Belfast was a constituency in the Irish House of Commons, the house of representatives of the Kingdom of Ireland, until 1800.

== History ==
Belfast in County Antrim was enfranchised as a borough constituency in 1613. It continued to be entitled to send two Members of Parliament to the Irish House of Commons until the Parliament of Ireland was merged into the Parliament of the United Kingdom on 1 January 1801.

During the Commonwealth of England, Scotland and Ireland Belfast was represented from 1654 in the Westminster Parliament as part of the Carrickfergus and Belfast constituency. Belfast was the place of election in this single-member constituency. See First Protectorate Parliament for further details.

In 1661, following the restoration of the king, the Parliament of Ireland was re-established as it had existed before the Protectorate. In the Patriot Parliament of 1690 summoned by King James II, Belfast was represented by one member.

Under the Acts of Union 1800 the Parliament of Ireland was merged with the Parliament of Great Britain to form the Parliament of the United Kingdom. The 300 members of the Irish House of Commons were reduced to 100 Irish members of the United Kingdom House of Commons. As part of that process Belfast lost one of its seats.

== Members of Parliament, 1613–1801 ==
Election	First MP	Second MP	
1613	Sir John Blennerhassett	George Trevelyan	
1634	Charles Price	Thomas Bramston	
1634	Charles Price	John Ingersall	
1639	Sir William Wrey	George Rawdon	
1654–1660	Commonwealth – See Carrickfergus and Belfast (constituency)		
1660	Sir Jerome Alexander		
1661	William Knight	Henry Davys	
1689	Mark Talbot	Belfast had only one seat	
1692	Sir Richard Levinge (Note: Also elected for Blessington, for which he chose to sit.)	James Macartney	
1692	George Macartney	James Macartney	
1695	Charles Chichester	James Macartney	
1703	William Crafford	William Cairnes	
1707	William Crafford	Samuel Ogle	
1713	Robert Moore	Anthony Atkinson	
1715	George Macartney	John Ichingham Chichester	
1721	George Macartney	George Macartney	
1725	George Macartney	John Chichester	
1727	George Macartney	David John Barry	
1745	George Macartney	John Chichester	
1747	George Macartney	William Macartney	
1757	Arthur Barry	William Macartney	
1761	John Chichester	John Ludford	
1768	Hon. Henry Skeffington	George Hamilton	
1776	Hon. Henry Skeffington	Barry Yelverton (Note: Also elected for Carrickfergus, for which he chose to sit.)	Patriot
1777	Hon. Henry Skeffington	Alexander Crookshank	
1784	Hon. Henry Skeffington	Joseph Hewitt	
1792	Hon. Henry Skeffington	Sir William Godfrey, 1st Bt	
1797	Lord Spencer Stanley Chichester	George Crookshank	
1798	Alexander Hamilton	George Crookshank	
January 1800	James Edward May	George Crookshank	
February 1800	James Edward May	John Congreve	
1801	Succeeded by the Westminster constituency Belfast		

== Bibliography ==
- O'Hart, John (2007). The Irish and Anglo-Irish Landed Gentry: When Cromwell came to Ireland. Vol. II. Heritage Books. ISBN 978-0-7884-1927-0.
- Leigh Rayment's historical List of Members of the Irish House of Commons. Cites: Johnston-Liik, Edith Mary (2002). The History of the Irish Parliament 1692-1800 (6 volumes). Ulster Historical Foundation.
