= Battle of Dornock =

Battle on 25 March 1333 during the Second War of Scottish Independence

Coordinates: 54.984°N 3.202°W

- Part of Second War of Scottish Independence
Date	25 March 1333
Location	Dornock, on the western Anglo-Scottish border
Result	English victory

Belligerents
Kingdom of England	Kingdom of Scotland

Commanders and leaders
Ralph Dacre, 1st Baron Dacre; Anthony de Lucy, 1st Baron Lucy	Sir William Douglas, Lord of Liddesdale (POW)

Strength
800	50+

Casualties and losses
2	26+ killed

The Battle of Dornock was fought on 25 March 1333 during the Second War of Scottish Independence.

== Background ==
In 1333 Edward Balliol, a claimant to the Scottish throne, sought support from the English King Edward III. In exchange for ceding the region of Lothian to England, Balliol was given assistance and replenished forces. He returned to Scotland and attacked the Scots at Berwick-upon-Tweed. After several retaliatory and counterattacks from both sides, the attempt failed and no tactical advantage was gained.

== Build Up ==
In response, William of Lochmaben, Sir Ralph Dacre and Sir Anthony Lucy led an English force of 800 men into Dumfriesshire. William Douglas, Lord of Liddesdale and 50 Scottish defenders along with Sir Humphrey Boys and Sir Humphrey Jardine moved to intercept them.

== The battle ==
On 25 March 1333, the small Scottish force intercepted the English at the village of Dornock. Little is known about the battle itself, as it was reportedly over very quickly, but 24 Scots (along with the two Humphreys) were killed and Douglas was taken prisoner. England reported only two losses.

== Aftermath ==
The rest of the Scots fled, and Douglas was imprisoned for two years under special instructions from King Edward. The Scottish poet Andrew Wyntoun noted the battle in his verse:

That ikle tyme at Lowchmabne
Off Annandyrdale the floure was tane

With off the West Marche men
That had thame in till Ingland then.
Amang thaim Williame of Dowglas
Takyn an till presone was.
That was bot erlys for to tell

Off infortwne that efftyr fell.

A well in the area was known as the sword well by the late 18th century, probably because artefacts of the battle were discovered near to there.

== Sources ==
=== Primary ===
- Knighton, Henry, Chronicon, ed. Joseph Rawson Lumby, 1889–1895.
- The Lanercost Chronicle, ed. and trans H. Maxwell, 1913.
- Wyntoun, Andrew of, The Original Chronicle of Scotland, ed. F. J. Amours, 1907.

=== Secondary ===
- Neilson, G., The Battle of Dornock, in Transactions of the Dumfriesshire and Galloway Antiquarian and Natural History Society, 1895–6.
- Nicholson, R., Edward III and the Scots, 1965.
