= Francis Blake (1638–1718) =

English politician, landowner and magistrate

Sir Francis Blake (October 1638 – 8 January 1718) was an English politician, landowner, and magistrate who served as a Member of Parliament for Berwick-upon-Tweed and Northumberland in several Parliaments between 1689 and 1705. A prominent country Whig, he played an active role in local government in Middlesex and Northumberland, acquired the Ford Castle estate through marriage after lengthy legal disputes, and was knighted by William III of England in 1689.

== Early life and family background ==
Francis Blake was born in 1638, the eldest son of Francis Blake (died c. 1692) of Highgate, Middlesex, and his wife Catherine, daughter and heiress of Sir Bartholomew Vincent of Highgate. His father was a successful London merchant and financier who accumulated considerable wealth through money lending, enabling the family to purchase lands in Middlesex and Oxfordshire, including the manor of Cogges.

In 1657, Blake was admitted to the Middle Temple to receive a legal education. Through his father's financial ventures and strategic investments, the family expanded their interests into northern England, laying the groundwork for Blake's later political and territorial influence in Northumberland.

== Marriage and the Ford Castle estate ==
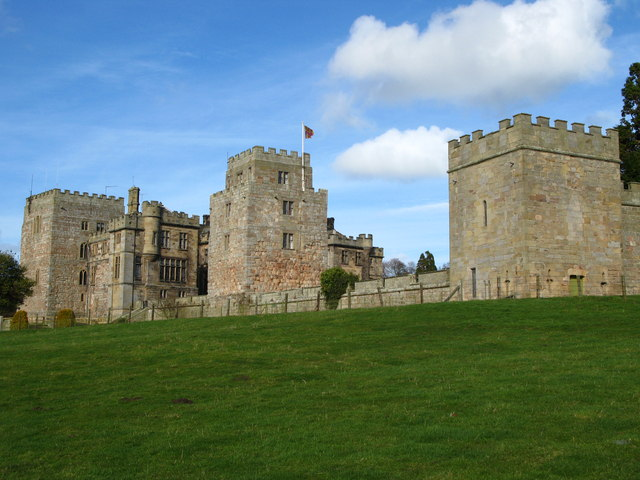
Ford Castle entered the possession of Francis Blake through his marriage to Elizabeth Carr in around 1662

Around 1662, Blake married Elizabeth (died 1701), daughter and co-heiress of William Carr of Ford Castle, Northumberland. The marriage eventually brought the ancient estate of Ford Castle into the Blake family, though Blake's possession of the property was marred by decades of complex and bitter litigation.

The Carr family estates were heavily burdened with debt and mortgages, many of which had been acquired by Blake's father. Following the death of William Carr, competing claims arose between Blake, representing his wife's interest, and other claimants, notably Lady Elizabeth Delaval and Thomas Carr. The protracted legal disputes involved proceedings in the Court of Chancery and Parliament. Blake eventually secured clear title to Ford Castle and its associated lands, establishing the estate as the primary seat of his family's northern interests and providing him with significant local electoral influence in the borough of Berwick-upon-Tweed.

== Local government and the Exclusion Crisis ==
Blake entered public administration in the 1670s. He was appointed a justice of the peace (J.P.) for Middlesex in 1673 and served as a commissioner for assessment for the county between 1677 and 1680.

During the political instability of the Exclusion Crisis (1679–1681), Blake aligned himself with the Whig opposition, which sought to exclude the Catholic James, Duke of York (later James II), from the throne. As a result of his anti-Catholic and exclusionist sympathies, Blake was removed from the Middlesex commission of the peace in 1680 during the Tory reaction led by the Crown.

== Revolution of 1688 and knighthood ==
Following the Glorious Revolution of 1688 and the accession of William III and Mary II, Blake was fully restored to favour in local administration. In 1689, he was reappointed as a justice of the peace for Middlesex and was additionally added to the commission of the peace for Northumberland. He was also appointed a deputy lieutenant for Northumberland and served as a commissioner for assessment for the county from 1689 to 1690.

On 18 August 1689, Blake was knighted by William III at Hampton Court Palace in recognition of his loyalty to the new Protestant regime and his standing in local government. Upon his father's death around 1692, he succeeded to the family's Middlesex and Oxfordshire properties, further augmenting his personal wealth.

== Parliamentary career ==
Blake's parliamentary career spanned over two decades, during which he served in eight Parliaments as a representative for the borough of Berwick-upon-Tweed, a constituency where his northern estates gave him substantial interest.

Blake was first elected to Parliament for Berwick-upon-Tweed at the general election of January 1689 for the Convention Parliament. In the House of Commons, he acted as a firm Whig. He supported the declaration that James II had abdicated the throne and voted in favour of filling the vacant throne with William and Mary.

Although he did not sit in the Parliaments of 1690 or 1695, Blake returned to the House of Commons at the general election of August 1698, once again representing Berwick-upon-Tweed. He was re-elected in the January 1701, November 1701 and 1702 general elections. Blake's political voting record reflected a consistent Whig orientation. In 1704 he voted against the Tack. He strongly supported measures securing the Protestant succession, including the Association of 1696 and the Abjuration Oath. While generally supporting the Whig administrations and military measures under William III and Queen Anne, Blake occasionally took an independent "Country" stance on matters of taxation and executive patronage. He monitored northern border affairs and constituency interests relating to Berwick-upon-Tweed and Northumberland, including local trade, fortification, and taxation matters. He stood for election, unsuccessfully, in the 1705 English general election and the 1708 British general election.

Because all three of his sons died before him, Sir Francis Blake was succeeded in his estates by his grandson, Francis Blake, who was later created a baronet (the Blake baronets of Twizell) in 1774. Blake died in 1718 at the age of 80 and was succeeded in his Northumberland and Middlesex estates by his grandson.
