= William Dacre, 5th Baron Dacre =

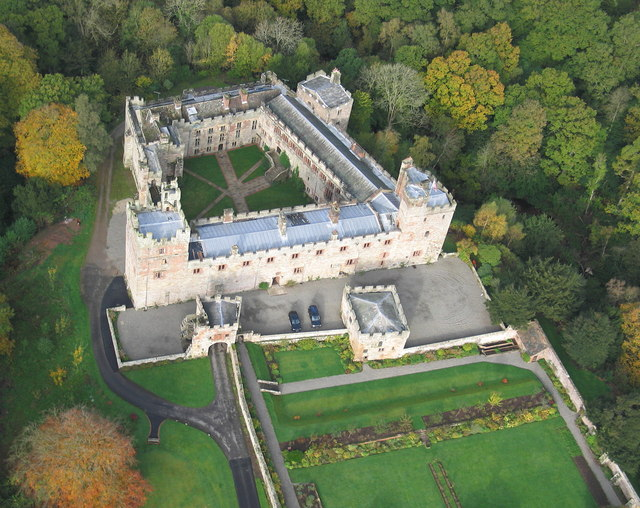
- Naworth Castle, seat of the Dacre family
- Born: 1357
- Died: 20 July 1398 (aged 40–41)
- Noble family: Dacre
- Spouse: Joan Douglas
- Issue: Thomas Dacre, 6th Baron Dacre
- Father: Hugh Dacre, 4th Baron Dacre
- Mother: Ela Maxwell

William Dacre, 5th Baron Dacre (1357–20 July 1398) was an English nobleman and soldier. He was born in 1357, son of Hugh Dacre, 4th Baron Dacre and his wife Ela Maxwell, daughter of Alexander Maxwell of Caerlaverock. He succeeded his father as Baron Dacre upon the latter's death in 1383.

Dacre's military career began in 1382 in Scotland, where he was knighted while serving under the banner of Richard le Scrope. He was part of Richard II's invading army during the 1385 punitive expedition into Scotland.

Dacre was called to give a deposition in the celebrated case of Scrope v Grosvenor. He testified in favour of Scrope, and against Sir Robert Grosvenor.

Dacre married Joan Douglas, said to be an illegitimate daughter of the Earl of Douglas. (Note: Burke identifies her father as the 1st Earl of Douglas, but gives the incorrect first name of "James" rather than "William") Their son, Thomas succeeded to the barony upon William Dacre's death in 1398.

== Notes ==
Peerage of England
| Preceded by Hugh Dacre | Baron Dacre; 1383–1398 | Succeeded by Thomas Dacre |
