= Lanercost =

Village in Cumbria, England

Coordinates: 54.966°N 2.698°W

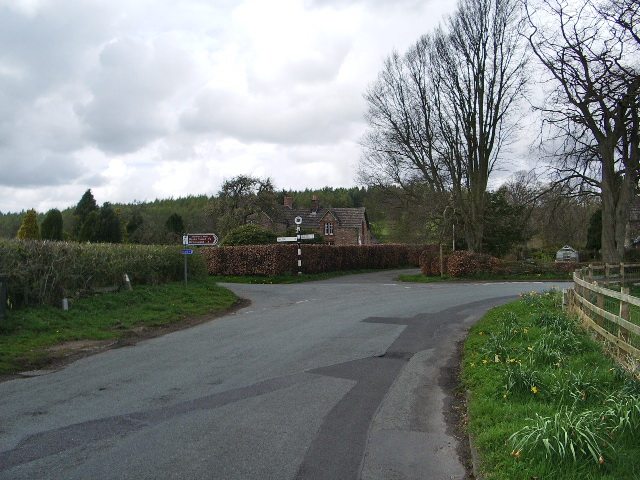
- Lanercost

- Location in the former Carlisle district, Cumbria Location within Cumbria
- OS grid reference: NY533638
- Civil parish: Burtholme
- Unitary authority: Cumberland
- Ceremonial county: Cumbria
- Region: North West
- Country: England
- Sovereign state: United Kingdom
- Post town: BRAMPTON
- Postcode district: CA8
- Dialling code: 016977
- Police: Cumbria
- Fire: Cumbria
- Ambulance: North West
- UK Parliament: Carlisle

Lanercost is a village in the northern part of Cumbria, England. The settlement is in the civil parish of Burtholme, in the Cumberland local government district. Lanercost is known for the presence of Lanercost Priory and its proximity to Hadrian's Wall.

== History ==
The toponym is of Primitive Welsh or Cumbric origin. The first element is a Cumbric form of the Welsh llanerch, "glade or laund". The second element is possibly the personal name Awst (from the Latin Augustus).

Lanercost Priory was founded in 1165 as an Augustinian house of Canons.

== See also ==
- Listed buildings in Burtholme
