= Margaret de Multon, 2nd Baroness Multon of Gilsland =

Margaret de Multon (died 1361) was the second to hold the title Baroness Multon of Gilsland. The title Baron Multon of Gilsland was created once in the Peerage of England. On 26 August 1307 Thomas de Multon was summoned to parliament as Baron Multon of Gilsland. As the only daughter and heiress, Margaret inherited the title and estates of her father. She married Ranulph (Ralph) de Dacre, who was summoned to parliament as Lord Dacre in 1321. The title and estates after Margaret inherited them were conveyed to the Dacre family jure uxoris.

She was succeeded by her son William Dacre, 2nd Baron Dacre.

Margaret was a daughter of Thomas de Multon.
