= Anthony Atkinson (politician) =

Irish politician

Anthony Atkinson was an Irish politician.

Atkinson was born in 1681 at Roscrea and educated at Trinity College, Dublin. A barrister, he was an MP in the Irish House of Commons for St Johnstown from 1711 to 1713, and for Belfast from 1713 to 1715. He died in 1743.
