= Ralph Dacre, 1st Baron Dacre =

English peer

- Arms of Dacre: Gules, three escallops argent
- Born: ca. 1290
- Died: 1339
- Noble family: Dacre
- Spouse: Margaret de Multon, 2nd Baroness Multon of Gilsland
- Issue: William Dacre; Thomas Dacre; Ralph Dacre; Hugh Dacre
- Father: William Dacre
- Mother: Joan Gernet

Ralph (or Ranulph) Dacre, 1st Baron Dacre (ca. 1290 – April 1339) was an English peer. The Dacres were a family pre-eminent in Cumberland where they were famous for their exploits in checking and avenging the depredations of the Scots. The family was among the oldest and most powerful on the northern border together with the families of Neville and Percy, to whom they were related.

Dacre was the son of Sir William Dacre of Cumberland (son of Ralph de Dacre and Joane de Lucy) and Joane Gernet. His great-grandfather, William de Dacre of Dacre (died c.1258), had been a Sheriff of Cumberland and then Sheriff of Yorkshire, as well as holding the office of Governor of Carlisle. He had five siblings:

- Margaret Joan Harington (married into Harington family
- Thomas Dacre
- Elizabeth Dacre
- Joan Tunstall (married Henry de Tunstall)
- Mary Dacre

In 1335, a licence to crenellate his home, Naworth Castle, was granted to Ralph during the reign of Edward III.

In 1321 he was summoned to the House of Lords as Lord Dacre. In 1331 he was appointed High Sheriff of Cumberland and Governor of Carlisle.

He married Margaret de Multon, Baroness Multon of Gilsland. Dacre carried off his bride-to-be, a ward of Edward II, from Warwick Castle where she was in the care of Thomas de Beauchamp; the official record states:

Ranulph de Dacre pardoned for stealing away in the night, out of the King's custodie, from his Castell of Warwick, of Margaret, daughter and heir of Thomas Multon of Gillsland, who held of the King in capite and was within age, whereof the said Ranulph standeth indighted in curia Regis.

He commanded the English in the Battle of Dornock. On the 25th March 1333, a Scottish force intercepted the English at the village of Dornock, Dumfriesshire. Little is known about the battle itself, as it was reportedly over very quickly with the Scots fleeing the scene. Lord Dacre died in April 1339 and was succeeded in the barony by his eldest son, William. His third and fourth sons Ralph and Hugh also succeeded in turn. Another son, Thomas, died without issue and did not succeed to the barony.

== Notes ==
Peerage of England
Preceded by New Creation	Baron Dacre; 1321–1339	Succeeded by William Dacre
