= Kathleen Pelham Burn =

British socialite and aviator

Kathleen Pelham Burn CBE CMG
- Born: 1887
- Died: 18 March 1966 (aged 78–79)
- Other names: Lady Kathleen Moore
- Spouses: Henry Moore, 10th Earl of Drogheda (m. 1909; div. 1922) Guillermo de Landa y Escandon (m. 1922; div. 1929)
- Children: Charles Moore, 11th Earl of Drogheda; Lady Patricia Doreen Moore

Kathleen Pelham Burn CBE CMG (1887 – 18 March 1966) was a British socialite, aviator, and sportswoman. She was one of the "bright young things".

== Early life ==
Kathleen was born into a wealthy family, her mother's side from mining, her father's Scottish landowners. She was the daughter of Charles Maitland Pelham-Burn and Isabella Romanes Russel, whose family owned Dundas Castle. Her father was an officer in the Seaforth Highlanders.

Her paternal grandfather was Maj.-Gen. Henry Pelham Burn and her maternal grandparents were Eliza (née Curle) Russel and James Russel, who took over for the coal and iron businesses of his father.

== Interests ==
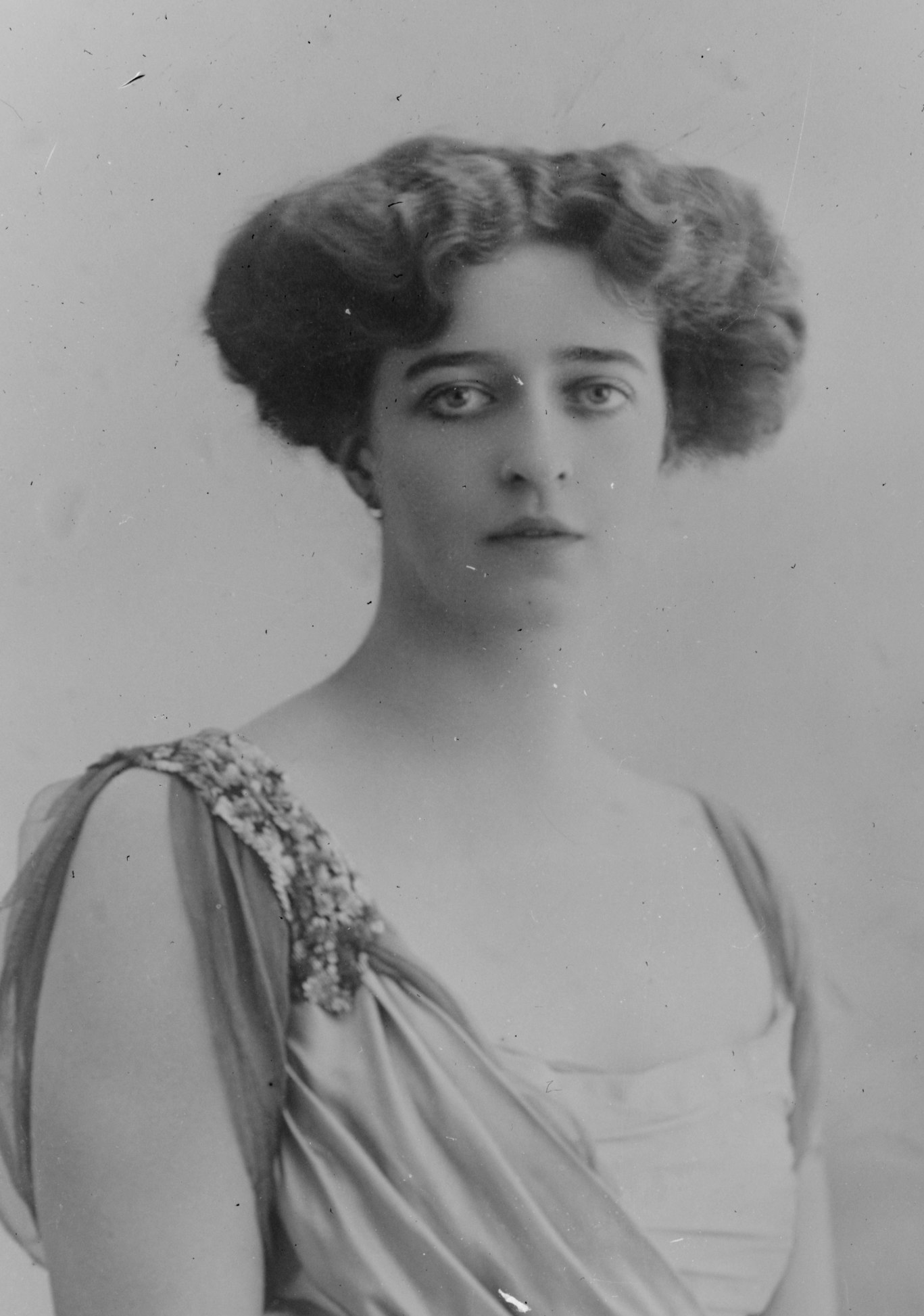
Pelham Burn in 1909

Pelham Burn was interested in various pursuits. Turtle Bunbury describes her as "an enigmatic cigarette-smoking 20th century lady famous for dabbling in the occult".

She had the ability to "pursue her manifold interests with great vigour" from her youth. She was particularly interested in flying; she became one of the first women to fly as a passenger in a plane. She later became known as "the Flying Countess" for her many passenger journeys and then for flying in aircraft exhibitions across the UK and Ireland to raise money for the Royal Air Force during World War II. She had also worked for aviation charities during World War I, and was a guest at Edward Maitland's pre-flight celebrations of the R34 successfully attempting the first return Atlantic crossing.

Her other interests included driving fashionable cars around London and playing tennis at All England Lawn Tennis and Croquet Club (Wimbledon), being one of its first members. She competed in The Championships, Wimbledon once, in 1914, though she went out in the second round. She was patron and president of the London Ladies' Motor Club, frequently played golf, and was a lover of contemporary art, but not music or literature.

Bunbury notes that she held séances that were social events attended by celebrities of the day, including Jacob Epstein, Augustus John, and Wyndham Lewis.

In 1919 she was appointed Companion, Order of St. Michael and St. George. She was also a Commander of the Order of the British Empire.

== Personal life ==
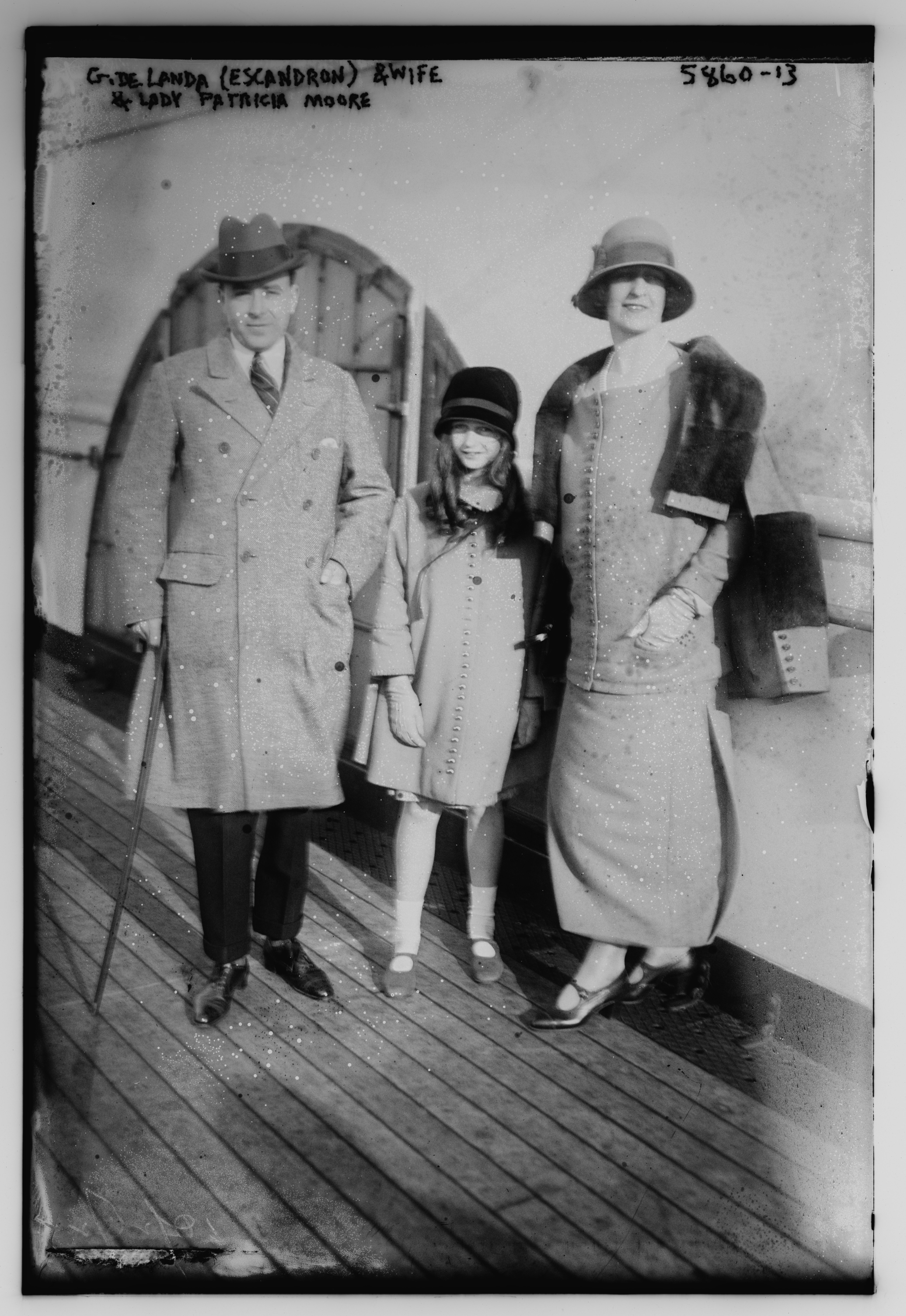
Photograph of Kathleen, her second husband, Guillermo de Landa y Escandron, and her daughter, Lady Patricia Moore, October 25, 1922

Pelham Burn's first husband was the Anglo-Irish civil servant Henry Ponsonby Moore, 10th Earl of Drogheda. They wed on 3 March 1909 and divorced in 1922; Pelham Burn filed for divorce in 1921 on account of Henry's unfaithfulness. The marriage gave two children: Charles (born 1910) and Patricia (born 1912), whom Pelham Burn was granted custody of in the divorce. The couple had been married in "a grand ceremony in St. Giles's Cathedral, Edinburgh" and lived in London at 40 Wilton Crescent; they also owned Moore Abbey. Charles later said that his parents seemed to live separate lives and their divorce was not surprising. Before their divorce in 1922, they were the parents of:

- Charles Moore, 11th Earl of Drogheda (1910–1989), who married British radio performer Joan Eleanor (née Birkbeck) Carr in 1935.
- Lady Patricia Doreen Moore (1912–1947), who married Sir Herbert Latham, 2nd Baronet, son of Sir Thomas Latham, 1st Baronet, in 1933. After he was arrested, attempted suicide, and imprisoned for indecency, they divorced in 1941, and she married Richard Aherne, son of William Aherne, at the home of actor Cary Grant in 1943. They divorced in 1943.

On 31 August 1922, Pelham Burn married Guillermo "Billy" de Landa y Escandon, a Mexican playboy and son of former Mexico City Governor Guillermo Landa y Escandón. They divorced in 1929.

=== Sexuality ===
She is accounted by her son as being bisexual, as he wrote: "All her life she was attracted by men and women [...] she knew intimately Donald Campbell, Alan Cobham, Kaye Don, Jim Mollison, Amy Johnson, and plenty of others besides." She may have also had an affair with Wyndham Lewis during her first marriage, whom she also commissioned for art against her husband's wishes.

Peerage of Ireland
Preceded by Anne Tower Moir	Countess of Drogheda; 1909–1922	Succeeded by Olive Mary Paget
