= Henry Moore, 10th Earl of Drogheda =

Anglo-Irish peer, officer and civil servant

The Right Honourable The Earl of Drogheda KCMG PC

Representative peer of Ireland
- In office 1913–1957
- Preceded by: The Lord Dunboyne
- Succeeded by: Position lapsed

Personal details
- Born: Henry Charles Ponsonby Moore; 21 April 1884
- Died: 22 November 1957 (aged 73)
- Spouse(s): Kathleen Pelham Burn; Olive Mary Meatyard
- Children: Charles Moore, 11th Earl of Drogheda; Lady Patricia Aherne
- Parent(s): Ponsonby Moore, 9th Earl of Drogheda; Anne Tower Moir

Henry Charles Ponsonby Moore, 10th Earl of Drogheda KCMG PC (21 April 1884 – 22 November 1957) was an Anglo-Irish civil servant, British Army officer, barrister and peer.

== Early life ==
He was the son of Ponsonby Moore, 9th Earl of Drogheda and Anne Tower Moir. His sister was Lady Beatrice Minnie Ponsonby Moore, who married Capt. Struan Robertson Kerr-Clark. After he was killed in action during World War I, she married James Hope, 1st Baron Rankeillour (son of James Hope-Scott and Lady Victoria Alexandrina Fitzalan-Howard, a daughter of the 14th Duke of Norfolk), in 1941. His father inherited the earldom of Drogheda in 1892 upon the death of his distant cousin, Henry Moore, 3rd Marquess of Drogheda, after which the marquessate and barony of 1801 became extinct.

His paternal grandparents were Ponsonby Arthur Moore (a descendant of the 5th Earl of Drogheda) and Augusta Sophia Gardner (a daughter of Gen. Hon. William Henry Gardner and grandson of the Adm. Alan Gardner, 1st Baron Gardner). His maternal grandparents were Flora (née Towers) Moir and George Moir, a well-known Scottish advocate and author.

== Career ==
He was educated at Eton and Trinity College, Cambridge, before working as a clerk in the Foreign Office between 1907 and 1917. On 28 October 1908 he succeeded to his father's title and in 1913 was elected as an Irish representative peer, entitling him to a seat in the House of Lords. Having left the Foreign Office, on 31 July 1917 he commissioned into the Irish Guards and subsequently saw active service in the First World War. In 1919 he was made a Companion of the Order of St Michael and St George. He relinquished his commission in 1921.

After leaving the Army, Drogheda trained in law and became a member of the Inner Temple. A qualified barrister, he mainly practiced in the divorce court and was "instrumental in furthering divorce reform in the House of Lords."

=== Public service ===
During the Second World War, he served as Director-General of the Ministry of Economic Warfare between 1942 and 1945. On 1 January 1945 he was knighted as a Knight Commander of the Order of St Michael and St George. Between 1946 and 1957 he was Chairman of Committees and Deputy Speaker of the House of Lords, and in 1951 he was made a member of the Privy Council of the United Kingdom. On 30 January 1954 he was made Baron Moore, of Cobham in the County of Surrey in the Peerage of the United Kingdom, thus entitling him and his descendants to automatic seats in the House of Lords.

Between 1918 and 1922, Drogheda served as the last Lord Lieutenant of Kildare.

== Personal life ==
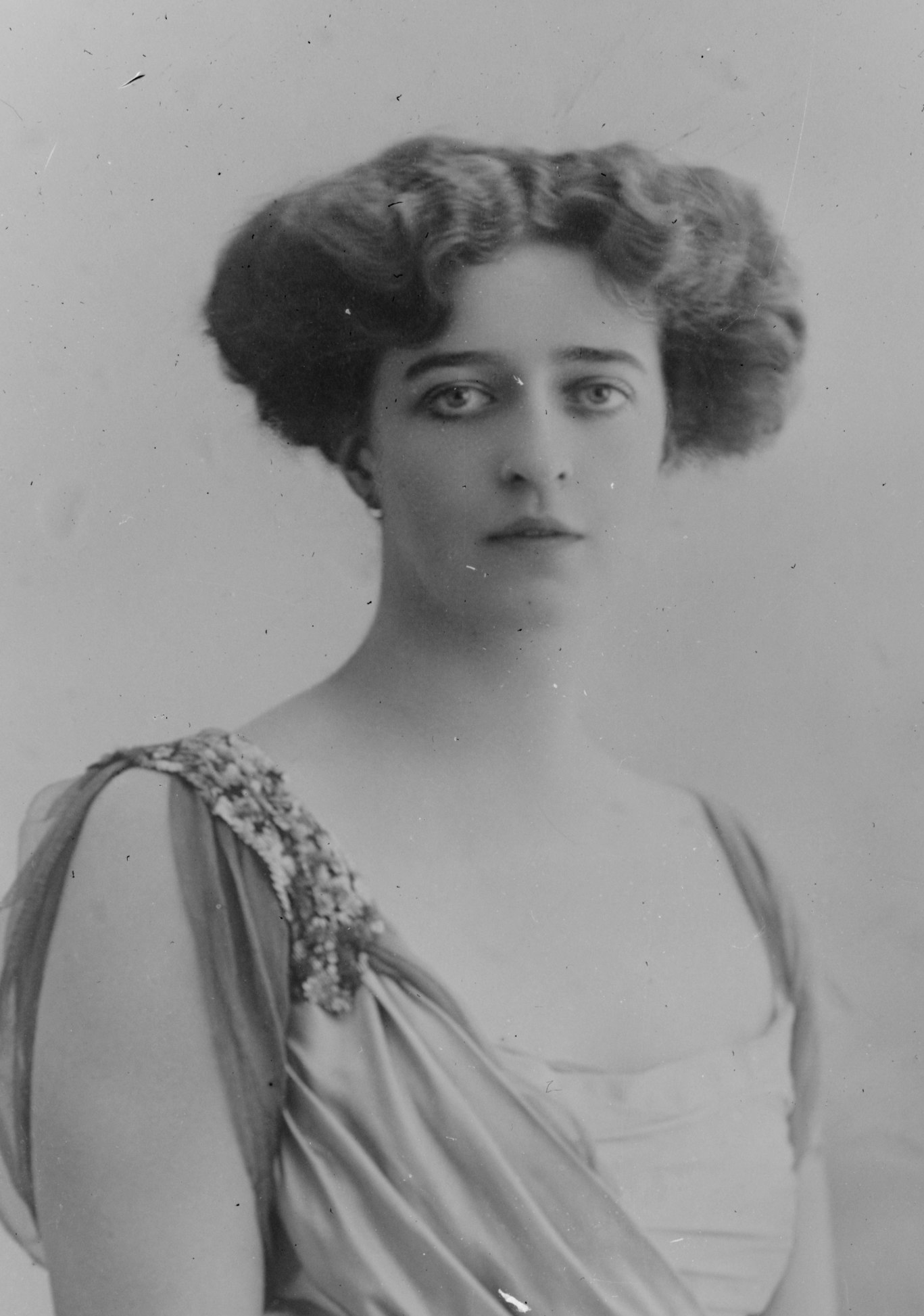
Cameo portrait of his first wife, Kathleen Pelham Burn, 1909

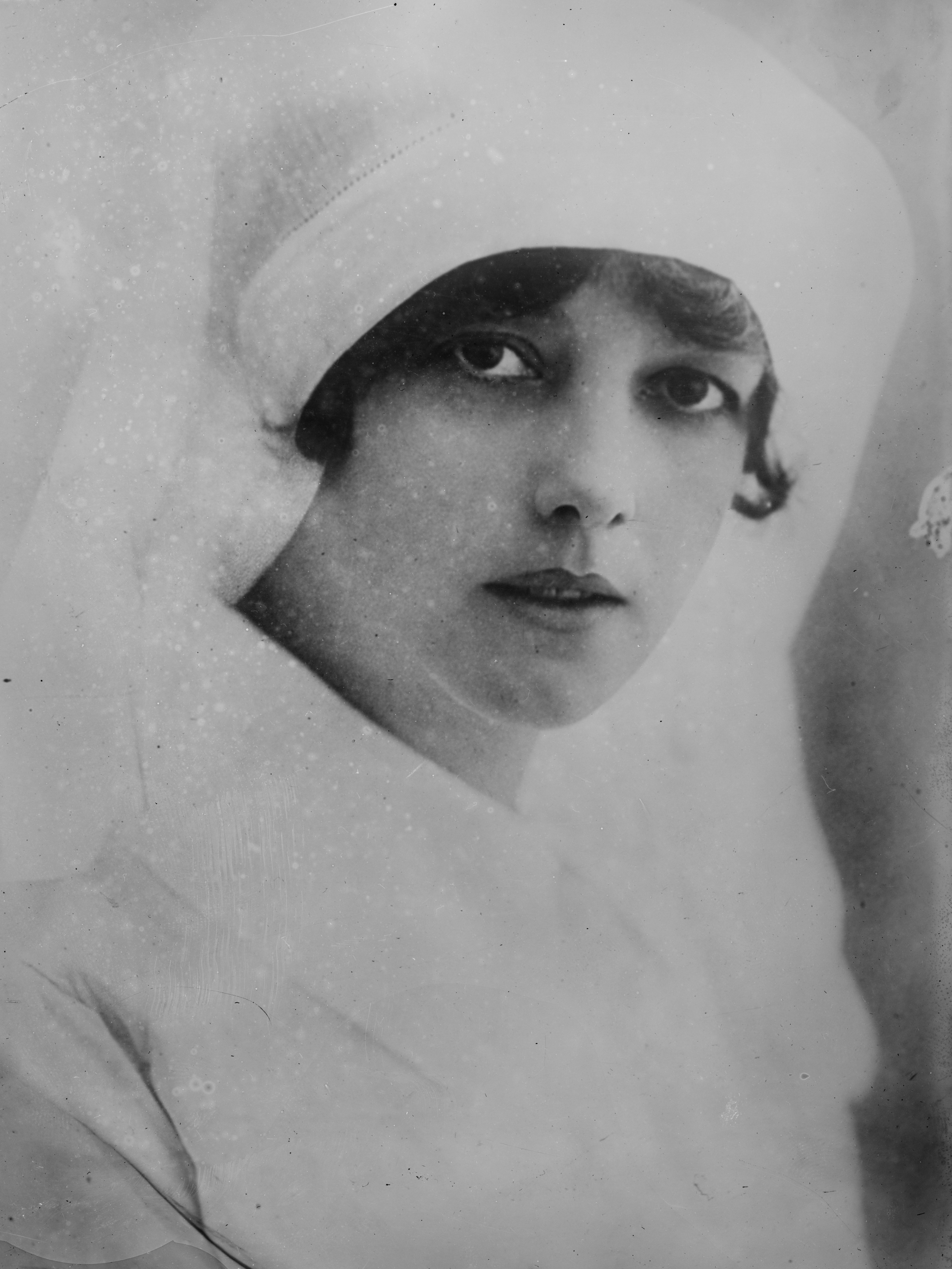
Photograph of his second wife when she was known as Lady Victor Paget, as a Red Cross Nurse serving hospitals in Britain, c. 1916

Drogheda married twice, firstly on 3 March 1909 to Kathleen Pelham Burn, a British socialite, aviator, and sportswoman who was considered one of the "bright young things". She was the daughter of Charles Maitland Pelham-Burn and Isabella Romanes Russel. Before their divorce in 1922, they were the parents of:

- Garrett Moore, 11th Earl of Drogheda (1910–1989), who married British radio performer Joan Eleanor (née Birkbeck) Carr in 1935.
- Lady Patricia Doreen Moore (1912–1947), who married Sir Herbert Latham, 2nd Baronet, son of Sir Thomas Latham, 1st Baronet, in 1933. After he was arrested, attempted suicide, and imprisoned for indecency, they divorced in 1941, and she married Richard Aherne, son of William Aherne, at the home of actor Cary Grant in 1943. They divorced in 1943.

After their divorce, Lord Drogheda married Lady Victor Paget (née Olive Mary Meatyard), a one time popular actress who was a daughter of George Meatyard, on 22 June 1922. She was the former wife of Lord Victor Paget, younger brother of Charles Paget, 6th Marquess of Anglesey.

Lord Drogheda died on 22 November 1957 and was succeeded by his eldest son from his first marriage, Charles, who at the time was the managing director of The Financial Times.

Political offices
Preceded by The Lord Dunboyne	Representative peer for Ireland; 1913–1957	Succeeded by Position lapsed
Honorary titles
Preceded by Sir Anthony Weldon, Bt	Lord Lieutenant of Kildare; 1918–1922	Succeeded by Office lapsed
Government offices
Preceded by Sir Frederick Leith-Ross	Director-General of the Ministry of Economic Warfare; 1940–1945; With: Sir Frederick Leith-Ross (1940–1942)	Succeeded by none
Peerage of Ireland
Preceded by Ponsonby Moore	Earl of Drogheda; 1908–1957	Succeeded by Charles Moore
Peerage of the United Kingdom
New creation	Baron Moore; 1954–1957	Succeeded by Charles Moore
