= Charles Moore, 1st Marquess of Drogheda =

British Army officer and politician (1730–1822)

Field Marshal The Most Honourable The Marquess of Drogheda KP PC (Ire)
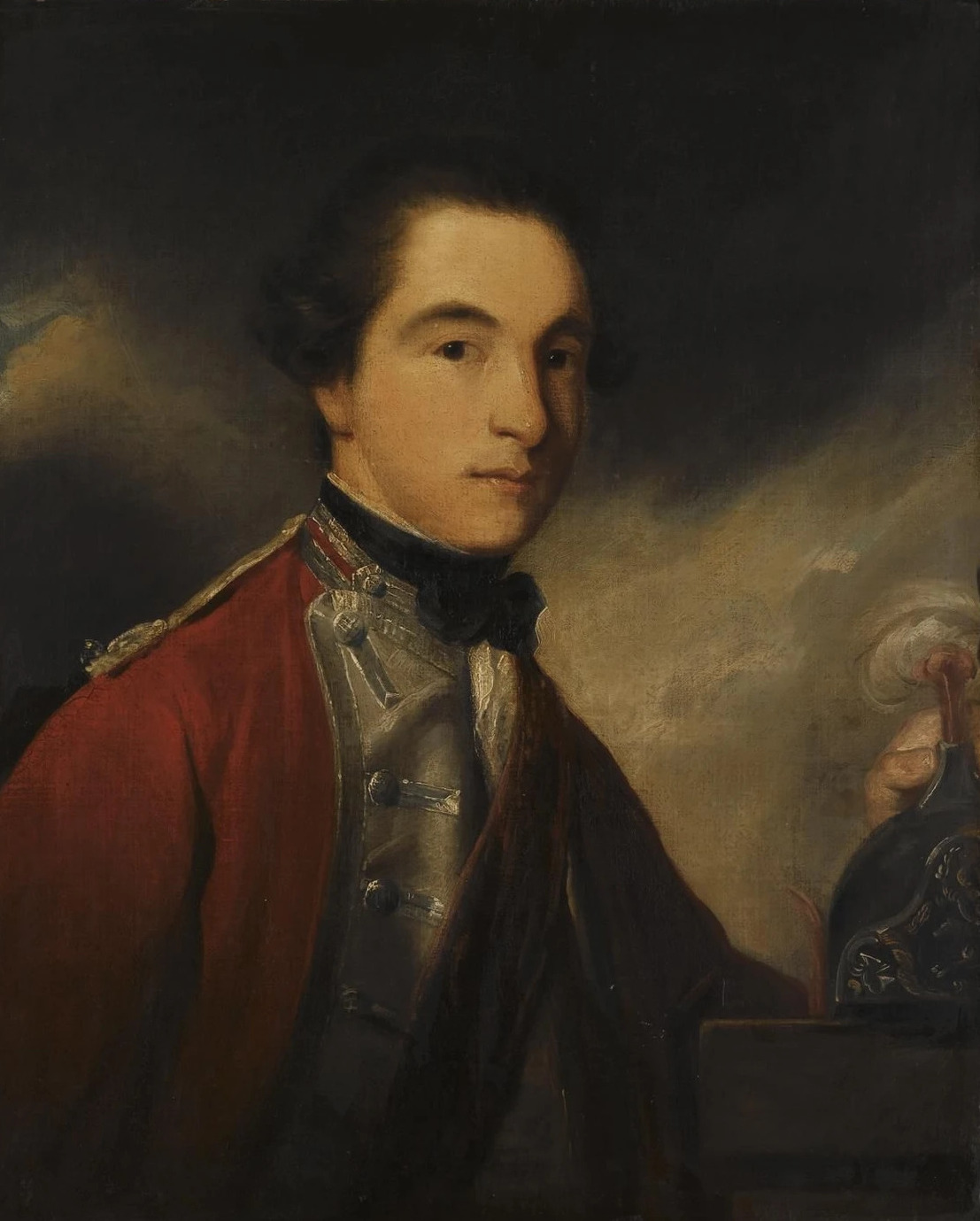
- Portrait by Sir Joshua Reynolds, c. 1761

Chief Secretary for Ireland
- In office 1764–1765
- Preceded by: William Gerard Hamilton
- Succeeded by: Sir Charles Bunbury

Personal details
- Born: 29 June 1730
- Died: 22 December 1822 (aged 92) Dublin, Ireland
- Resting place: Drogheda, County Louth
- Spouse: Lady Anne Seymour-Conway (after 1766)
- Relations: Brabazon Ponsonby, 1st Earl of Bessborough (grandfather)
- Children: 8, including Charles
- Parent(s): Edward Moore, 5th Earl of Drogheda; Lady Sarah Ponsonby

Military service
- Allegiance: Great Britain
- Branch/service: British Army
- Years of service: 1744–1797
- Rank: Field marshal
- Unit: 12th Regiment of Dragoons
- Commands: 18th Light Dragoons
- Battles/wars: Jacobite rising of 1745; Battle of Culloden

Field Marshal Charles Moore, 1st Marquess of Drogheda, KP, PC (Ire) (29 June 1730 – 22 December 1822) was a British Army officer and politician. He bore the colours of his regiment at the Battle of Culloden in April 1746 during the Jacobite rising of 1745 and later commanded the 18th Light Dragoons during operations against the Whiteboys in Ireland. He also sat as Member of Parliament in the Irish House of Commons and, having served as Chief Secretary to the Lord Lieutenant of Ireland, he went on to become Master-General of the Irish Ordnance.

== Early life ==
Moore was the eldest of six sons and two daughters of Edward Moore, 5th Earl of Drogheda and, his first wife, Lady Sarah Ponsonby. His paternal grandparents were Charles Moore, Lord Moore (a son of Henry Hamilton-Moore, 3rd Earl of Drogheda) and Jane Loftus. His maternal grandparents were the former Sarah Margetson and Brabazon Ponsonby, 1st Earl of Bessborough.

== Military career ==
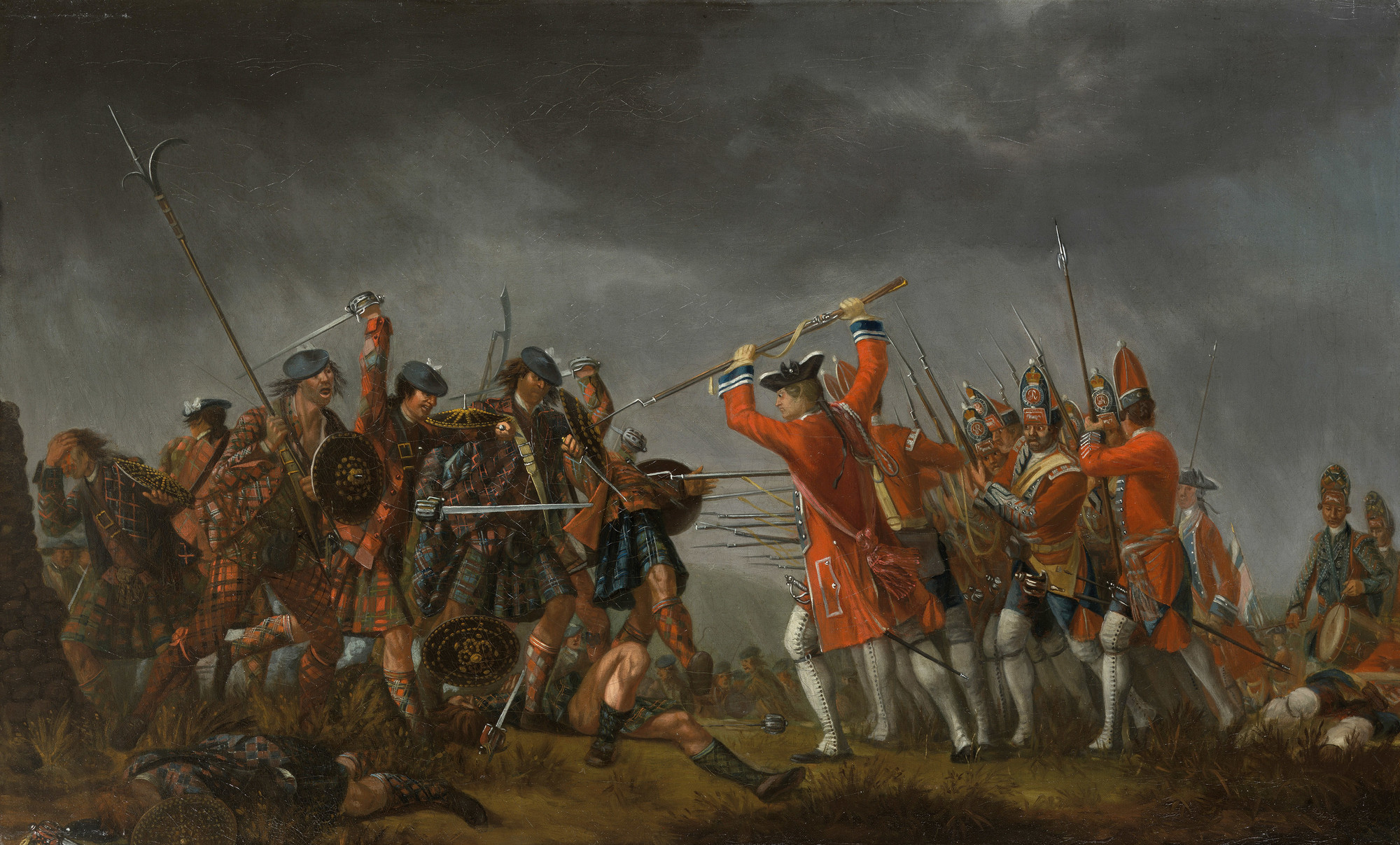
The Battle of Culloden, at which Moore bore the 12th Dragoons' colours

Moore joined the British Army in 1744 as a cornet in the 12th Regiment of Dragoons. He fought in the Jacobite rising of 1745, bearing his regiment's colours at the Battle of Culloden on 16 April 1746. Moore was promoted to captain in 1750 and again to major in 1752 and brevet lieutenant colonel on 18 January 1755. Promoted to brevet colonel on 19 February 1762, he was appointed as honorary colonel of his regiment on 3 August. Moore commanded the 18th Light Dragoons during operations against the Whiteboys which began in 1762.

Promoted to major general on 30 April 1770, Moore became Master-General of the Irish Ordnance and colonel-in-chief of the Royal Irish Artillery in 1770. Moore served as Muster-Master-General in Ireland from May to November 1807 and was promoted to field marshal on 17 July 1821 at the age of 91.

=== Political career ===
In 1757 Moore became Member of Parliament for St Canice, holding the seat until he succeeded to his father's titles in 1758. He was also elected Grandmaster of the Grand Lodge of Ireland in 1758, a post he held for the next two years. He became Governor of County Meath in January 1759 and lieutenant-colonel commandant of the 19th (later 18th) Light Dragoons on 7 December 1759.

He became Chief Secretary to the Lord Lieutenant of Ireland in 1763, Governor of Kinsale and Charles Fort in 1765 and a Lord Justice of Ireland in 1766. He was appointed Custos Rotulorum of King's County in 1766 and Custos Rotulorum of Queen's County in 1769, both offices for life.

He became Member of Parliament for Horsham in 1776, and having been promoted to lieutenant-general on 29 August 1777, he was appointed one of the Founder Knights of the Order of St. Patrick on 17 March 1783.

=== Peerage ===
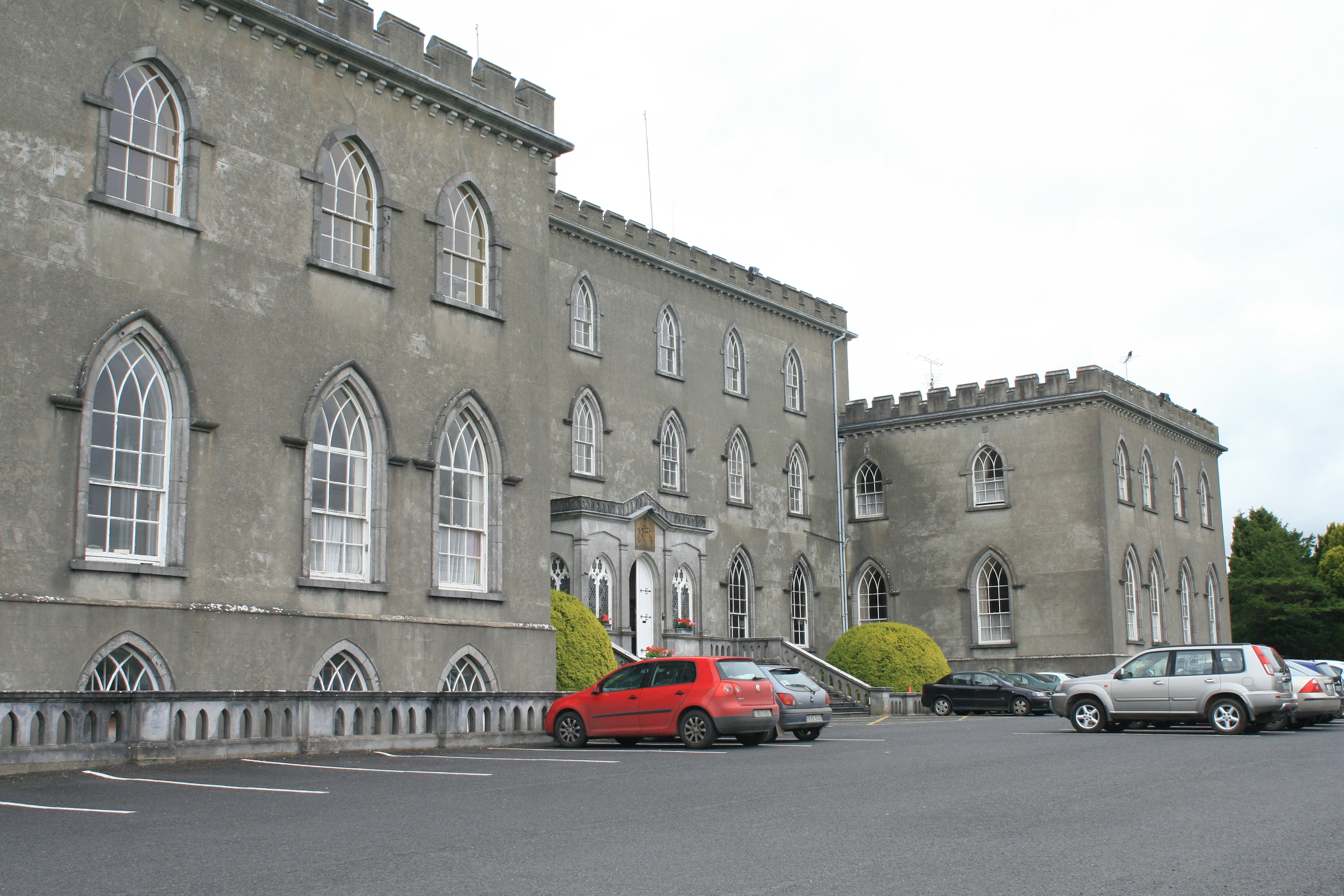
Moore Abbey, County Kildare

Moore succeeded as 6th Earl of Drogheda following the death of his father at sea while travelling from England to Dublin in October 1758.

Created Marquess of Drogheda in the Peerage of Ireland in July 1791 in recognition of the support he had given the Government, Moore was promoted to full general on 12 October 1793. He was appointed one of the joint Postmasters General of Ireland in 1797. On 13 January 1801, he was made Baron Moore, of Moore Place in the County of Kent, in the Peerage of the United Kingdom.

== Personal life ==
On 15 February 1766, Moore married Lady Anne Seymour-Conway, the daughter of Francis Seymour-Conway, 1st Marquess of Hertford. He commissioned Moore Abbey as his country home in 1767. They had eight children, including:

- Charles Moore, 2nd Marquess of Drogheda (1770–1837), an MP for Queen's County from 1790 to 1791 who died unmarried.
- Lady Elizabeth Emily Moore (1771–1841), who married George Nugent, 7th Earl of Westmeath.
- Hon. Henry Moore (d. 1825), who married Hon. Mary Letitia Parnell, second daughter of Henry Parnell, 1st Baron Congleton, and Lady Caroline Elizabeth Dawson (eldest daughter of the 1st Earl of Portarlington), in 1824.
- Lady Mary Moore (d. 1842), who married Alexander Stewart, of Ards, brother of Robert Stewart, 1st Marquess of Londonderry, and second son of Alexander Stewart, in 1791.
- Lady Gertrude Moore, who died unmarried.
- Lady Frances Moore (d. 1833), who married John Ormsby Vandeleur, in 1800.

He was an important patron of the artist William Ashford.

Lord Drogheda died in Dublin on 22 December 1821 and was buried at St Peter's Church in Drogheda. His wife's family had a tradition of mental illness, which may explain the fact that their elder son went insane in his twenties.

=== Descendants ===
Through his son Henry, he was a grandfather of the Henry Moore, 3rd and last Marquess of Drogheda.

== Sources ==
- Heathcote, Tony (1999). The British Field Marshals, 1736–1997: A Biographical Dictionary. Barnsley: Leo Cooper. ISBN 0-85052-696-5.
- Hyde, Montgomery (1959). The Strange Death of Lord Castlereagh. William Heinemann. ASIN B0006D8FGC.
- Waite, Arthur Edward (2007). A New Encyclopedia of Freemasonry. Vol. I. Cosimo Inc. ISBN 978-1-60206-641-0.

Parliament of Ireland
| Preceded by Richard Dawson; Hervey Morres | Member of Parliament for St Canice; 1757–1759; With: Richard Dawson | Succeeded by Richard Dawson; Eland Mossom |
Parliament of Great Britain
| Preceded by James Wallace; Jeremiah Dyson | Member of Parliament for Horsham; 1776–1780; With: James Wallace | Succeeded by James Wallace; Viscount Lewisham |
Masonic offices
| Preceded by Lord Newtown-Butler | Grandmaster of the Grand Lodge of Ireland; 1758–1760 | Succeeded by The Earl of Charleville |
Political offices
| Preceded by William Gerard Hamilton | Chief Secretary for Ireland; 1764–1765 | Succeeded by Sir Charles Bunbury |
Peerage of Ireland
| New creation | Marquess of Drogheda; 1791–1822 | Succeeded by Charles Moore |
| Preceded by Edward Moore | Earl of Drogheda; 1758–1822 | Succeeded by Charles Moore |
Peerage of the United Kingdom
| New creation | Baron Moore; 1801–1822 | Succeeded by Charles Moore |
