= Charles Moore, 2nd Marquess of Drogheda =

Irish peer (1770–1837)

The Most Honourable The Marquess of Drogheda

Member of Parliament for Queen's County
- In office 1790–1791 Serving with Sir John Parnell, Bt
- Preceded by: John Warburton; Sir John Parnell, Bt
- Succeeded by: Sir John Parnell, Bt; John Warburton

Personal details
- Born: Charles Moore; 23 August 1770
- Died: 6 February 1837 (aged 66) Greatford, Lincolnshire
- Relations: Francis Seymour, 1st Marquess of Hertford (grandfather)
- Parent(s): Charles Moore, 1st Marquess of Drogheda; Lady Anne Seymour Conway

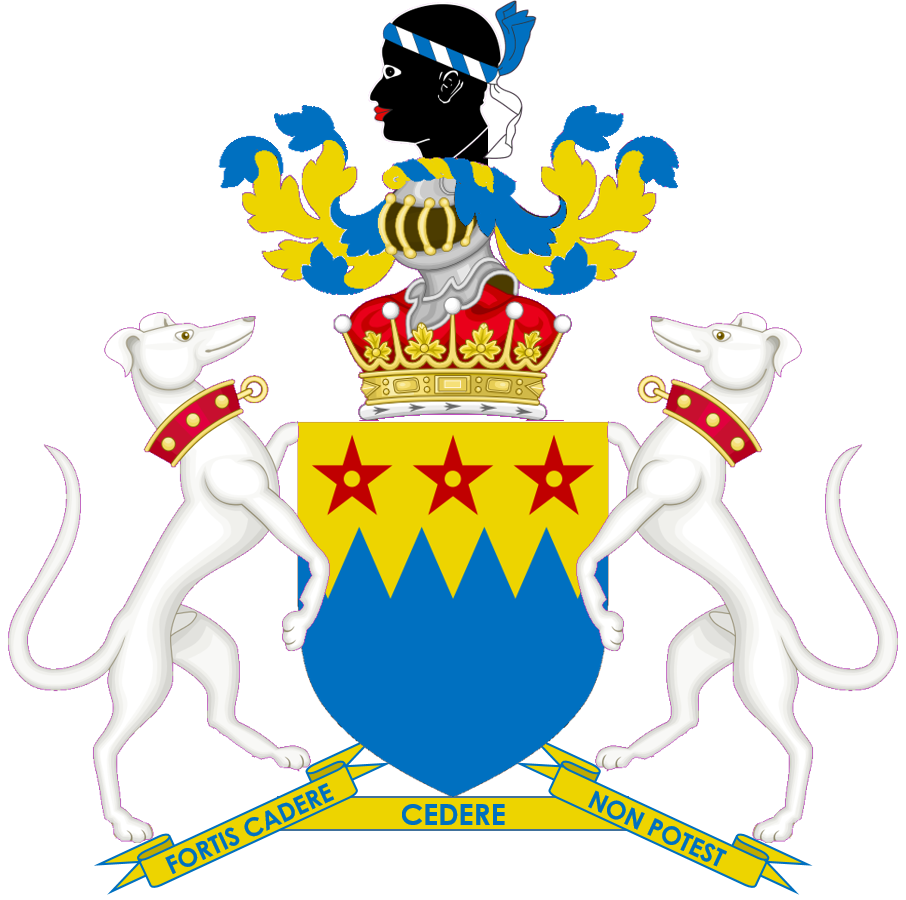
The armorial achievement of the Earls of Drogheda

Charles Moore, 2nd Marquess of Drogheda (23 August 1770 – 6 February 1837), styled Viscount Moore until 1822, was an Irish peer. He went insane when he was about twenty, and spent the rest of his life at the private asylum at Greatford, Lincolnshire, which had been founded by the renowned physician Francis Willis.

== Early life ==
He was the eldest son of Charles Moore, 1st Marquess of Drogheda, and Lady Anne Seymour Conway, daughter of Francis Seymour, 1st Marquess of Hertford. Some sources give his first name as Edward. (Note: Vicary Gibbs, writing in The Complete Peerage, cites the Countess of Drogheda's 1905 History of the Moore Family in giving the 2nd Marquess's name as Edward, not Charles.)

== Career ==
He was elected to the Irish House of Commons as member for Queen's County in 1790, but unseated the following year on foot of a petition that he was disqualified by reason of insanity. Despite this, he was given the rank of captain-lieutenant in the Royal Irish Artillery in 1793. Lord Moore's father was colonel of the regiment.

=== Mental illness ===
When he was about the age of twenty he began to show signs of mental illness, which may have been hereditary. He was placed in the care of Dr Francis Willis at Greatford Hall. Willis had won renown in 1789 for curing King George III of what was thought then to be insanity but is now generally agreed to have been porphyria. His treatment involved a regimen of fresh air and manual labour. Whether the treatment had any success in Lord Drogheda's case is unclear, but certainly, there was no significant recovery of his mental faculties, as there had been for the King; Drogheda remained at Greatford until his death in 1837. He was unmarried and his titles passed to his nephew Henry Moore, 3rd Marquess of Drogheda.

The cause of his mental illness is unclear, but it is significant that his mother's family had a history of eccentricity and mental instability. Lord Castlereagh, who committed suicide in 1822, was Lord Drogheda's first cousin and the increasingly strange behaviour which culminated in his death was thought by some to be due to a hereditary mental illness inherited from the Seymour Conway family, to which his mother, as well as Drogheda's, belonged.

== Notes ==
Parliament of Ireland
| Preceded by John Warburton; Sir John Parnell, Bt | Member of Parliament for Queen's County; 1790–1791; With: Sir John Parnell, Bt | Succeeded by Sir John Parnell, Bt; John Warburton |
Peerage of Ireland
| Preceded by Charles Moore | Marquess of Drogheda; 1822–1837 | Succeeded by Henry Moore |
Peerage of the United Kingdom
| Preceded by Charles Moore | Baron Moore; 1822–1837 | Succeeded by Henry Moore |
