= Derry Moore, 12th Earl of Drogheda =

British photographer

The Right Honourable The Earl of Drogheda
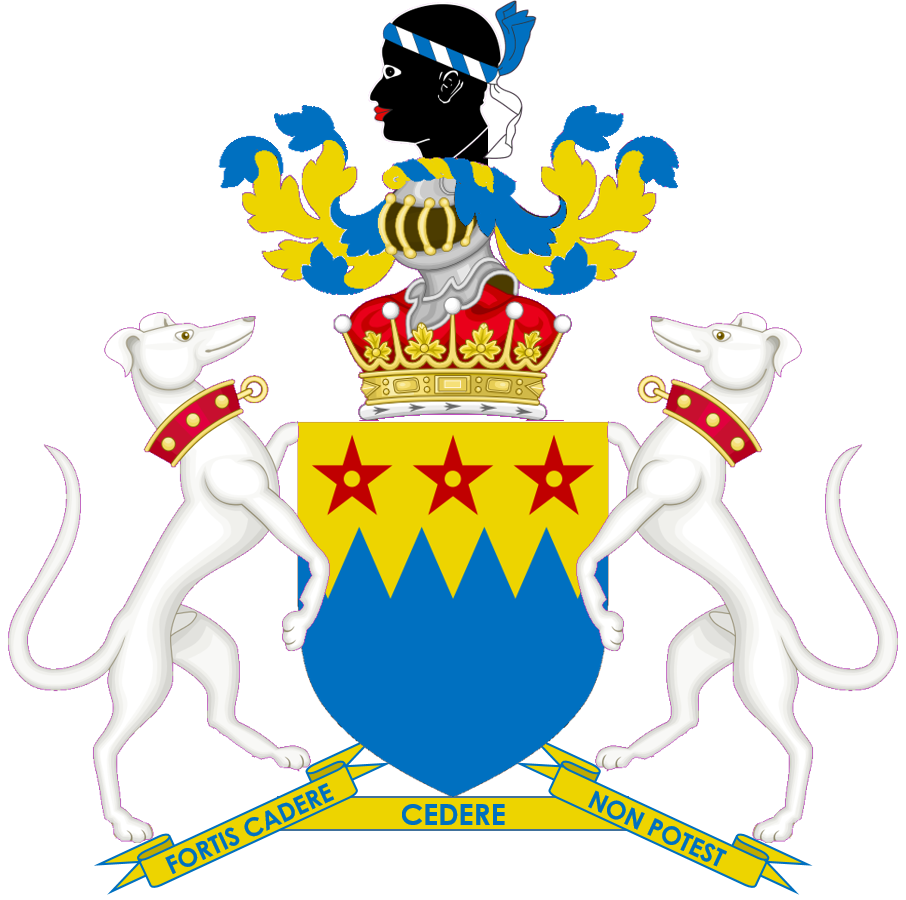
- Born: Henry Dermot Ponsonby Moore; 14 January 1937 (age 89); London, UK
- Education: Trinity College, Cambridge; Oskar Kokoschka's School of Seeing
- Occupation: Photographer
- Spouse(s): Eliza Lloyd (m. 1968 – div. 1972) Alexandra Henderson (m. 1978)
- Children: Benjamin (b. 1983); Garrett (b. 1986); Marina (b. 1988)

Henry Dermot Ponsonby Moore, 12th Earl of Drogheda (born 14 January 1937), is a British photographer known professionally as Derry Moore. He inherited the title of Earl of Drogheda from his father, The 11th Earl of Drogheda. He had the right to use the courtesy title Viscount Moore from November 1957 until December 1989.

== Education and career ==
Henry Dermot Ponsonby Moore was born on 14 January 1937 in London into an Anglo-Irish aristocratic family, the son of Charles Garrett Ponsonby Moore, 11th Earl of Drogheda, and Joan Eleanor (née Carr). He was educated at Eton and Trinity College, Cambridge, like his father, before studying painting at Oskar Kokoschka's School of Seeing in Salzburg, Austria. After working briefly as a travel agent in New York City, he took photography lessons from British photographer Bill Brandt. Then-Viscount Moore (as he was up until inheriting the earldom in December 1989) began his professional career in 1973, with a commission from the American magazine Architectural Digest. He photographed The Princess of Wales, Prince William and Prince Harry in 1992. His portrait, taken at Kensington Palace, was used by the Princess on her Christmas cards for that year.

Lord Drogheda photographed Queen Elizabeth II, the late Queen Elizabeth The Queen Mother, Indira Gandhi, Ronald Reagan, David Bowie, Iman, Benedict Cumberbatch and Helena Bonham Carter, as well as many other personalities. He became a leading photographer of architectural interiors and an illustrator of books, and had portraits published in Country Life and Vogue. He has thirty-seven portraits in the National Portrait Gallery's collection.

He hosted a book launch event in London for Venetian Gardens, which he co-authored with broadcaster Monty Don. The event gathered guests from the fields of art, literature, and media, including Emma Thynn, Marchioness of Bath, Countess Mountbatten of Burma, and makeup artist Mary Greenwell.

== Books ==
- The Dream Come True: Great Houses of Los Angeles; text by Brendan Gill (Lippincott & Crowell, 1980, ISBN 0-690-01893-2)
- Royal Gardens; by George Plumptre (Collins, 1981, ISBN 0-002-11871-8)
- Debrett's The Stately Homes of Britain: Introduced by the Owners; by Sybilla Jane Flower (Webb & Bower, 1982, ISBN 0-863-50070-6)
- Washington: Houses of the Capital; text by Henry Mitchell (Viking Press, 1982, ISBN 0-670-75006-9)
- The Englishwoman's House; edited by Alvilde Lees-Milne (Collins, 1984, ISBN 0-002-17344-1)
- The English Room; with Michael Pick (Weidenfeld & Nicolson, 1985, ISBN 0-297-78493-5)
- The Englishman's Room; edited by Alvilde Lees-Milne (Viking, 1986, ISBN 0-670-80791-5)
- The Gardens of Queen Elizabeth the Queen Mother. A Personal Tour with The Marchioness of Salisbury (Viking, 1988, ISBN 0-670-81216-1)
- The Shell Guide to the Gardens of England and Wales; with Sarah Hollis (Andre Deutsch, 1989, ISBN 0-233-98391-0)
- Evening Ragas: A Photographer in India (John Murray, 1997, ISBN 0-719-55809-3)
- Inside the House of Lords; with Clive Aslet (HarperCollins, 1998, ISBN 0-004-14047-8)
- Rooms; edited by Joseph Holtzman (Rizzoli, 2006, ISBN 0-8478-2826-3)
- Notting Hill (Frances Lincoln, 2007, ISBN 0-7112-2739-X)
- A Gardener's Life; by The Dowager Marchioness of Salisbury (Frances Lincoln, 2007, ISBN 0-711-22649-0)
- Sir John Soane's Museum, London; text by Tim Knox (Merrell, 2009, ISBN 1-858-94475-9) 3rd edition, 2016 ISBN 1-858-94649-2
- In House; text by Mitchell Owens (Rizzoli, 2009, ISBN 0-8478-3349-6)
- Great Gardens of Italy; with Monty Don (Quadrille, 2011, ISBN 978-1844009961)
- An English Room (Prestel, 2013, ISBN 978-0297788904)
- Houghton Hall: Portrait of an English Country House; by David Cholmondeley & Andrew Moore (Skira, 2014, ISBN 978-0847842926)
- Horses: Portraits by Derry Moore (Rizzoli, 2016, ISBN 978-0847848843)
- In the Shadow of the Raj: Derry Moore in India (Prestel, 2017, ISBN 978-3791383323)
- Great English Interiors; with David Mlinaric (Prestel, 2018, ISBN 978-3791381985); reissued 2023.
- Paradise Gardens: The World's Most Beautiful Islamic Gardens; with Monty Don (Two Roads, 2018, ISBN 978-1473666481)
- Japanese Gardens: A Journey; with Monty Don (Two Roads, 2019, ISBN 978-1473692299)
- London's Great Theatres; text by Simon Callow (Prestel, 2019, ISBN 978-3791383866)
- American Gardens; with Monty Don (Prestel, 2020, ISBN 978-3791386751)
- Venetian Gardens; with Monty Don (BBC, 2022, ISBN 978-1785947421)
- Spanish Gardens; with Monty Don (BBC, 2024, ISBN 978-1785948725)
- British Gardens; with Monty Don (BBC, 2026, ISBN 978-1785948732)

== Personal life ==
Lord Drogheda has been married to:

- Eliza Winn Lloyd (died 7 May 2008). She was the only daughter of Stacy Barcroft Lloyd Jr. and his first wife, the former Rachel Lambert; a stepdaughter of American banker and art collector Paul Mellon; and a great-granddaughter of Jordan Wheat Lambert, co-inventor of Listerine mouthwash. They married on 15 May 1968 and divorced in 1972. Caroline Kennedy was a flower girl at the couple's wedding, and John F. Kennedy Jr. was a page. The then Viscount and Viscountess Moore had no children, and she did not remarry.
- Alexandra Nicolette Henderson, the daughter of British diplomat Sir Nicholas Henderson and his wife, the former Mary Barber (née Cawadias). They married in Paris in 1978 and have three children: Benjamin Garrett Henderson Moore, Viscount Moore (born 1983), The Hon. Garrett Alexander Moore (born 1986), and Lady Marina Alice Moore (born 1988). As Alexandra Henderson, Lady Drogheda has been a producer and editor in the news and current affairs departments of the BBC, BBC1 and Talent TV.

== Coat of arms ==
Coat of arms of Derry Moore, 12th Earl of Drogheda

Crest
Out of a ducal coronet a Moor’s head Proper wreathed about the temples Argent and Azure.
Escutcheon
Azure on a chief indented Or three mullets pierced Gules.
Supporters
Two greyhounds Argent.
Motto
Fortis Cadere Cedere Non Potest (The brave may fall, but cannot yield)

Peerage of Ireland
Preceded by Garrett Moore	Earl of Drogheda; 1989–present	Incumbent
