= Stacy Barcroft Lloyd Jr. =

American businessman

Stacy Barcroft Lloyd Jr. (July 8, 1908 – December 6, 1994) was an American businessman, horse breeder, dairy cattle farmer and yachtsman. He was the founder of the equestrian journal The Chronicle of the Horse. and a renowned tandem carriage driver.

== Biography ==
Lloyd was born on July 8, 1908, at Ardmore, Pennsylvania. The Lloyd family's social status in Philadelphia dates from the time of William Penn. Stacy Barcroft Lloyd Sr. was a banker, President of the Philadelphia Savings Fund Society. His mother was Eleanor Borroughs Morris, a descendant of brewer Mayor Anthony Morris (I), founder of the Morris family, another prominent Philadelphia family.

He graduated from Princeton University in 1930 and went on to become the publisher and editor of the Clarke Courier Weekly in Clarke County, Virginia.

Lloyd's first marriage was November 25, 1932, to Rachel Lowe Lambert. They divorced in 1948. His children by Rachel Lambert were a son, Washington, D.C., antiquarian Stacy Barcoft Lloyd, III, and daughter Eliza. Rachel Lambert was a close friend of Jacqueline Kennedy Onassis and Caroline Kennedy served as a flower girl at Eliza's wedding to Derry Moore, 12th Earl of Drogheda. They divorced in 1948 and he remarried to Alice Babcock in 1950. They had a son Robin Lloyd, a writer and journalist, who was an announcer for NBC. After Alice died in May 1980 of polio he remarried in 1981 to his 3rd wife Virginia Ida “Vidy” Boy-Ed. Vidy Boy-Ed was the daughter of German Naval Attache Karl Boy-Ed and Virginia G. Mackay-Smith, daughter of Bishop Alexander Mackay-Smith of the Episcopal Diocese of Pennsylvania.

During World War II he served in the Morale Operations Branch of the Office of Strategic Services as a Lieutenant Colonel in the European Theatre of Operations. He shared a flat in Belgravia with another OSS operative Paul Mellon who later married Lloyd's ex wife Rachel.

An avid foxhunter, Lloyd teamed up with fellow foxhunter Gerald Webb in 1937 to produce The Middleburg Chronicle, an eight-page pamphlet devoted to local equestrian and foxhunting news. Based in Middleburg (Loudoun County) Virginia, the publication expanded over the years to include national and global equestrian sports. In 1947, after Webb was killed while competing in the Fox Hunters’ Challenge Cup at the Grand National steeplechase meet (Md.) when his horse fell at a jump, Lloyd continued to manage the publication until 1954.

During his 30 year marriage to his 2nd wife Alice, the couple lived on St. Croix in the United States Virgin Islands where they were among the biggest landowners on the island. He owned a dairy farm and raised beef cattle. He also owned and operated the local dairy bottling plant. Upon Alice's death he moved back to Virginia to reside in Clark County at his Long Pond Farm in Berryville, raising Welsh Cobs and a small herd of Charolais cattle with his 3rd wife Vidy.

From 1981 until his death in 1994 Lloyd remained an avid horseman and carriage driving enthusiast and often was seen driving his tandem of horses at carriage driving meets. He resided with his wife Vidy in Berryville, Virginia, spending their summers carriage driving and sailing at Mt. Desert Island in Southwest Harbor, Maine.

He died in Berryville, Virginia December 6, 1994 as a result of a carriage driving accident while working with a young horse.
