= Sir Anthony Weldon, 6th Baronet =

British Army officer and Irish official

Colonel Sir Anthony Arthur Weldon, 6th Baronet CVO DSO (1 March 1863 – 29 June 1917) was an Anglo-Irish British Army officer and official in the vice-regal household in the Dublin Castle administration in Ireland.

== Biography ==
Weldon was the eldest son of Sir Anthony Weldon, 5th Baronet and his wife Elizabeth Weldon (née Kennedy). He was educated at Charterhouse School and Trinity College, Cambridge, from where he graduated in 1884. The following year he was commissioned into the Prince of Wales's Leinster Regiment (Royal Canadians). He was promoted to lieutenant on 28 February 1885. Weldon was aide-de-camp to Lord Wolseley and he served in the Second Boer War, for which he was awarded the Distinguished Service Order in 1900. The same year he succeeded to his father's baronetcy and estates. In 1906, he served a term as High Sheriff of Queen's County.

In 1908, Weldon was appointed State Steward and Chamberlain to the Lord Lieutenant of Ireland, with responsibility for managing the vice-regal household and ceremonial matters in Ireland. He was made a Commander of the Royal Victorian Order in 1911. Between 2 December 1913 and his death he also served as Lord Lieutenant of Kildare.

He served in the British Army during the First World War and commanded a battalion of his regiment during the Easter Rising in 1916. On 1 January 1917 he was promoted to Brevet Colonel. On 19 June 1917, he died in Dublin; the Cambridge University Alumni, 1261-1900 recorded the cause of death as shell shock. He was buried in a Commonwealth War Graves Commission plot in the Church of Ireland cemetery of St John's in Athy.

Honorary titles
Preceded by Robert Kennedy	Lord Lieutenant of Kildare; 1913–1913	Succeeded by The Earl of Drogheda
Baronetage of Ireland
Preceded by Anthony Weldon	Baronet (of Dunmore); 1900–1917	Succeeded by Anthony Weldon
