= Augustus FitzGerald, 3rd Duke of Leinster =

Anglo-Irish peer

His Grace The Duke of Leinster PC PC (Ire)
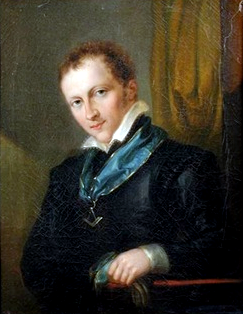
- The Duke of Leinster in Masonic regalia

Lord Lieutenant of Kildare
- In office 7 October 1831 – 10 October 1874
- Preceded by: New Office
- Succeeded by: The Marquess of Drogheda

Personal details
- Born: 21 August 1791
- Died: 10 October 1874 (aged 83)
- Spouse: Lady Charlotte Augusta Stanhope
- Children: Charles FitzGerald, 4th Duke of Leinster; Lord Gerald FitzGerald; Lady Jane Seymour FitzGerald; Lord Otho FitzGerald
- Parents: William FitzGerald, 2nd Duke of Leinster; Emilia Olivia St George

Augustus Frederick FitzGerald, 3rd Duke of Leinster, etc. PC PC (Ire) (21 August 1791 – 10 February/October 1874) was an Anglo-Irish peer and freemason, styled Marquess of Kildare from birth until 1804. He was born and died in Carton House. FitzGerald was Grand Master of the Grand Lodge of Ireland for most of the 19th century, holding the post for 61 years from 1813 until 1874.

== Family ==
FitzGerald was the eldest surviving son of William FitzGerald, 2nd Duke of Leinster and his wife, Emilia Olivia St George, daughter of the 1st Baron St George. He inherited his father's dukedom in 1804. On 16 June 1818, Leinster married Lady Charlotte Augusta Stanhope (15 February 1793 – 15 February 1859), the third daughter of Charles Stanhope, 3rd Earl of Harrington. They had four children:

- Charles FitzGerald, 4th Duke of Leinster (1819–1887)
- Lord Gerald FitzGerald (London, 6 January 1821 – 23 September 1886), married on 9 June 1862 Anne Agnes Barker (died 6 June 1913), and had:
  - Edward Gerald FitzGerald (London, 2 September 1863 – Studland, 5 August 1919), married in London on 20 February 1913 Anne Josephine Throckmorton, without issue
- Lady Jane Seymour FitzGerald (died 3 November 1898), married on 5 September 1848 George William John Repton (1818–1906)
- Lord Otho Augustus FitzGerald (1827–1882)

== Government ==
Leinster was appointed Custos Rotulorum of Kildare in 1819 and Lord Lieutenant of Kildare in 1831, holding both posts for life. In 1831, he was admitted to the Privy Council of Ireland and to the Privy Council of Great Britain and was Lord High Constable of Ireland at the coronations of William IV and Queen Victoria. He was a Commissioner of National Education for Ireland from 1836 to 1841.

== Freemasonry ==
In 1813, he was chosen Grand Master of the Grand Lodge of Ireland, a post he held until his death in 1874. Under FitzGerald and his Deputy Grand Secretary, John Fowler (1769-1856), all Freemasonic movements became highly centralised in Ireland and could not operative without the approval of the Grand Lodge.

Marc Bédarride's Rite of Misraim was imported from France to Ireland during the time of FitzGerald. One of the Bédarride brothers is supposed to have visited Ireland in 1820 and by February 1821, a council of seventeen members of the Rite was formed, including; FitzGerald, Fowler, Dumoulin, Norman, Mitchell, Trim and Jamar (a Frenchman residing in Dublin). Banned in France by the government in 1822, it continued to exist in Ireland as part of the Supreme Grand Council of Rites (approved by the Grand Lodge of Ireland), set up on 28 January 1838.

Masonic offices
Preceded by The Lord Donoughmore	Grandmaster of the Grand Lodge of Ireland; 1813–1874	Succeeded by The Duke of Abercorn
Honorary titles
New office	Lord Lieutenant of Kildare; 1831–1874	Succeeded by The Marquess of Drogheda
Peerage of Ireland
Preceded by William FitzGerald	Duke of Leinster; 1804–1874	Succeeded by Charles FitzGerald
