= Garrett Moore, 11th Earl of Drogheda =

British peer

1968 photograph, by Godfrey Argent

Charles Garrett Ponsonby Moore, 11th Earl of Drogheda KG, KBE (23 April 1910 – 24 December 1989), styled Viscount Moore until 1957 and known commonly as Garrett Moore, was a British peer.

== Early life ==
Lord Drogheda was the eldest son of The 10th Earl of Drogheda and his first wife, Kathleen Pelham Burn, and was educated at Ludgrove, Eton and Trinity College, Cambridge, where he was a contemporary of Victor Rothschild and Guy Burgess. In 1940, he became a captain in the Territorial Army division of the Royal Artillery. In 1946, he was appointed an Officer of the Order of the British Empire (OBE).

== Career ==
In 1946, he became managing director of The Financial Times and inherited his father's earldom in 1957. In 1964, he was promoted as a Knight Commander of the Order of the British Empire (KBE) and on his retirement in 1972, was appointed a Knight Companion of the Garter (KG). From 1974, he was President of the Institute of Directors and from 1983, was Independent National Director of Times Newspapers, holding both posts up until his death.

== Personal life and death ==
On 16 May 1935, at City Hall in New York City, Drogheda, then Viscount Moore, married Joan Eleanor Carr (1902–1989, née Joan Eleanor M. Birkbeck), a former wife of Dawson R. Miller and a former wife of violinist Isek D. Melsak (known professionally as Daniel Melsa). A concert pianist, she was the only child of Lilian Henrietta Birkbeck (née White, formerly Mrs. James Braidwood Birkbeck) and William Henry Carr, aka William Henry Carr-Birkbeck, who were unmarried. A newspaper report noted that on the marriage application, Lord Moore's fiancée stated that her two prior marriages had ended in 1929 and 1930, that she was employed as an "artiste", and that "she could not remember the name of her father."

The Droghedas had one child, Henry "Derry" Dermot Ponsonby (born 1937), a photographer, who inherited the earldom upon his father's death. Lord Drogheda died on 24 December 1989, aged 79.

== Arms ==
Coat of arms of Charles Moore, 11th Earl of Drogheda, KG, KBE
Coronet An Earl's Coronet Crest Out of a ducal coronet Or a moor's head in profile couped at the shoulders proper wreathed around the temples Argent and Azure. Escutcheon Azure on a chief indented Or three mullets pierced Gules. Supporters Two greyhounds Argent. Motto FORTIS CADERE CEDERE NON POTEST

== Sources ==
- Burke's Peerage

Peerage of Ireland
Preceded by Henry Charles Ponsonby Moore	Earl of Drogheda; 1957–1989	Succeeded by Henry Dermot Ponsonby "Derry" Moore
Peerage of the United Kingdom
Preceded by Henry Charles Ponsonby Moore	Baron Moore; 1957–1989	Succeeded by Henry Dermot Ponsonby "Derry" Moore
