= Earl of Drogheda =

Title in the Peerage of Ireland

Earldom of Drogheda
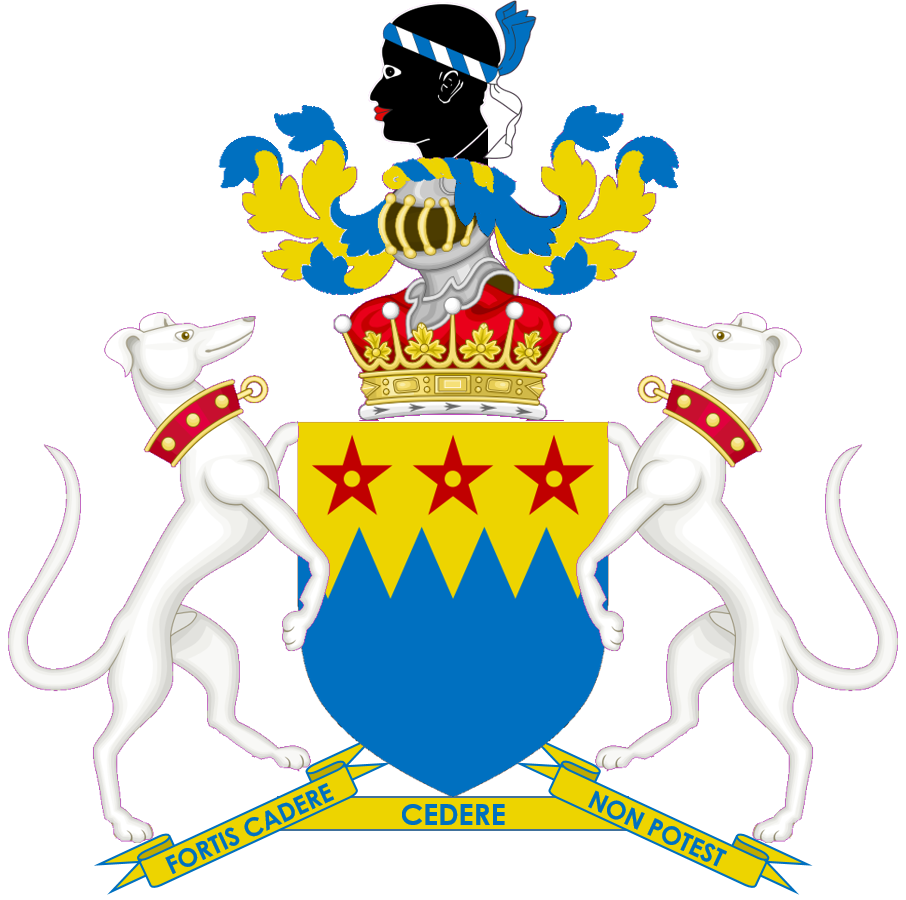
- Escutcheon: Azure on a chief indented Or three mullets pierced Gules. Crest: Out of a ducal coronet a Moor’s head Proper wreathed about the temples Argent and Azure. Supporters: Two greyhounds Argent.
- Creation date: 1661
- Created by: Charles II
- Peerage: Peerage of Ireland
- First holder: Henry Moore
- Present holder: Henry Dermont Ponsonby Moore
- Heir apparent: Benjamin, Viscount Moore
- Subsidiary titles: Viscount Moore
- Seats: Moore Abbey, Kildare
- Motto: Fortis Cadere Cedere Non Potest

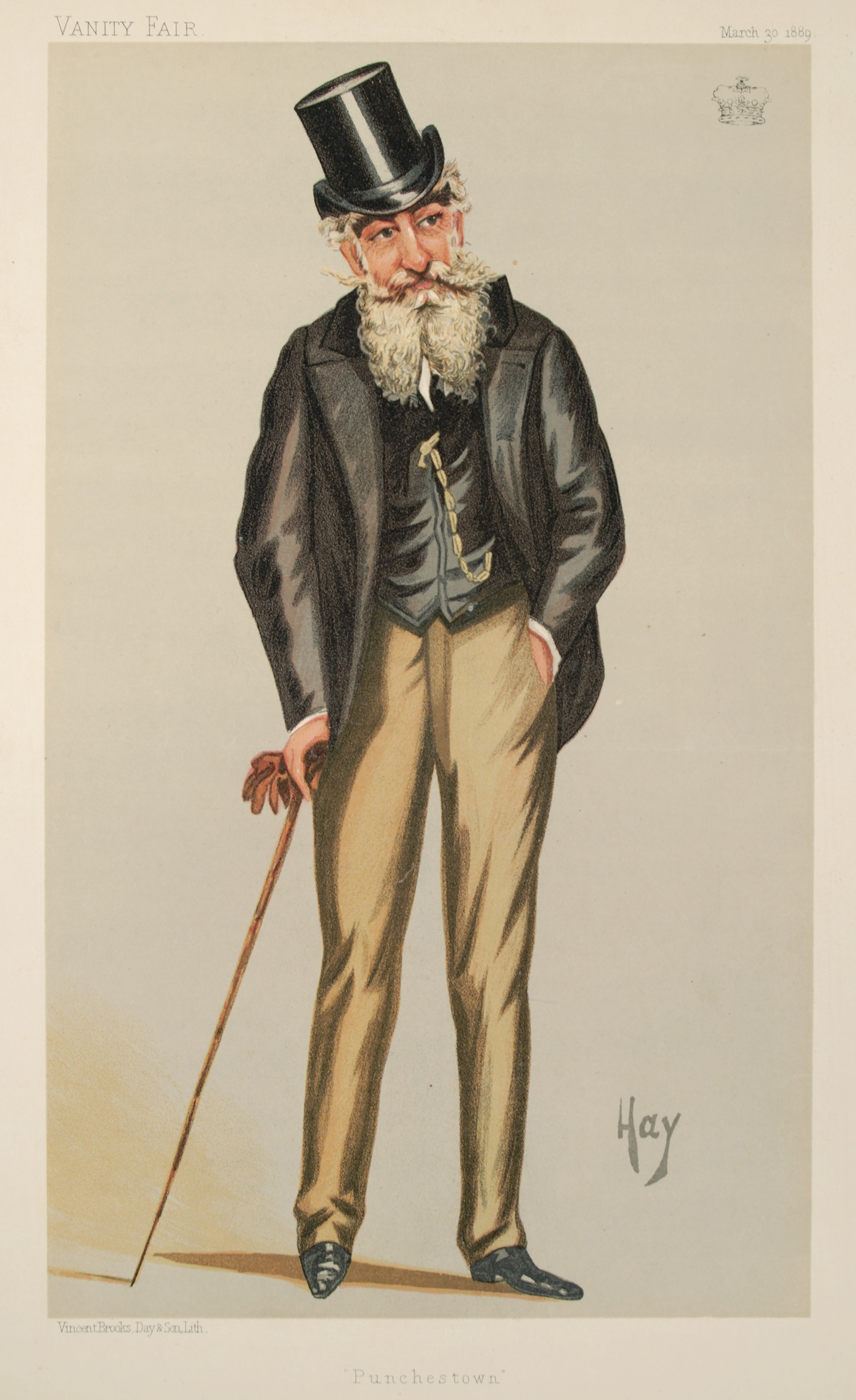
"Punchestown". The 3rd Marquess of Drogheda, as caricatured in Vanity Fair, March 1889.

Earl of Drogheda is a title in the Peerage of Ireland. It was created in 1661 for The 3rd Viscount Moore.

== History ==
The Moore family descends from Sir Garrett Moore, a staunch friend of Hugh O'Neill, the Great Earl of Tyrone, whose submission he facilitated, hosting the negotiations that led to the Treaty of Mellifont in 1603 and ending The Nine Years' War. He represented Dungannon in the Irish House of Commons, and served as President of Munster. In 1616 he was raised to the Peerage of Ireland as Baron Moore, of Mellefont in the County of Louth. He was further honoured in 1621 when he was made Viscount Moore, of Drogheda, also in the Peerage of Ireland. He was succeeded in 1627 by his son Charles, the second Viscount, who was killed at the Battle of Portlester while fighting for Charles I in the English Civil War. Charles was succeeded by his son Henry, the aforementioned third Viscount, who was raised to an earldom, as Earl of Drogheda, in 1661. The first Earl's younger son Henry, the third Earl (who succeeded his elder brother in 1679), assumed the additional surname of Hamilton upon succeeding to the estates of his brother-in-law, Henry Hamilton, 2nd Earl of Clanbrassil. In a feast of egotism, he built and named the Dublin streets of Henry Street, Moore Street, Earl Street, Of (or Off) Lane (now Henry Place, and an important escape route for the volunteers fleeing the GPO during the Easter Rising in 1916), and Drogheda Street (part of what is now O'Connell Street).

The third Earl was succeeded by his grandson Henry, the fourth Earl. The latter died without surviving children at an early age and was succeeded by his younger brother, Edward, the fifth Earl, who had previously represented Dunleer in the Irish Parliament. Edward's son and successor, Charles, the sixth Earl, was a distinguished soldier and politician. In 1791 he was created Marquess of Drogheda in the Peerage of Ireland. In 1801 he was also made Baron Moore, of Moore Place in the County of Kent, in the Peerage of the United Kingdom, which entitled him to an automatic seat in the British House of Lords.

His eldest son Charles, the second Marquess, suffered from mental illness, died childless and was succeeded by his nephew, Henry, the third Marquess, the son of Lord Henry Moore, second son of the first Marquess. The third Marquess notably served as Lord Lieutenant of Kildare between 1874 and 1892. He was childless and on his death in 1892 the marquessate and barony of 1801 became extinct. He was succeeded in the remaining titles by his second cousin once removed, Ponsonby Moore, who became the ninth Earl. He was the great-grandson of the Honourable Ponsonby Moore, younger son of the fifth Earl and brother of the first Marquess. The ninth Earl was elected an Irish representative peer in 1899. He was succeeded by his son, Henry, the tenth Earl, who was elected an Irish representative peer in 1913. In 1954 Henry was created Baron Moore, of Cobham in the County of Surrey, in the Peerage of the United Kingdom, which entitled him and his descendants to an automatic seat in the House of Lords. He was succeeded by his son, Garrett, the eleventh Earl, who was a journalist and businessman. As of 2014, the titles are held by the latter's son, the twelfth Earl, who succeeded in 1989. The twelfth Earl, Derry Moore, is a professional photographer.

Several other members of the Moore family may also be mentioned. John Moore, great-grandson of Arthur Moore, younger son of the first Viscount, represented Ballynakill in the Irish Parliament. He was the father of 1) John Moore, who represented Ballynakill in the Irish Parliament as well as Newry in the British Parliament, and of 2) Francis Moore, a General in the British Army. The Honourable Robert Moore, younger son of the third Earl, represented County Louth and Belfast in the Irish Parliament.

== Pronunciation ==
The title of the earldom is pronounced "Draw-hed-ah" in Ireland and "Draw-dah" in England.

== Seat ==
The family seat was Moore Abbey, near Monasterevin, County Kildare. Before that, for a time, the family seat was Mellifont Abbey near Drogheda in County Louth.

== Title holders ==
=== Viscounts Moore (1621) ===
- Garret Moore, 1st Viscount Moore (died 1627)
- Charles Moore, 2nd Viscount Moore (1603–1643)
- Henry Moore, 3rd Viscount Moore (died 1675) (created Earl of Drogheda in 1661)

=== Earls of Drogheda (1661) ===
- Henry Moore, 1st Earl of Drogheda (died 1675)
- Charles Moore, 2nd Earl of Drogheda (died 1679)
- Henry Hamilton-Moore, 3rd Earl of Drogheda (died 1714)
  - Charles Moore, Viscount Moore (1676–1714)
- Henry Moore, 4th Earl of Drogheda (1700–1727)
- Edward Moore, 5th Earl of Drogheda (1701–1758)
- Charles Moore, 6th Earl of Drogheda (1730–1822) (created Marquess of Drogheda in 1791)

=== Marquesses of Drogheda (1791) ===
- Charles Moore, 1st Marquess of Drogheda (1730–1822)
- Charles Moore, 2nd Marquess of Drogheda (1770–1837)
- Henry Francis Seymour Moore, 3rd Marquess of Drogheda (1825–1892)

=== Earls of Drogheda (1661; reverted) ===
- Ponsonby William Moore, 9th Earl of Drogheda (1846–1908)
- Henry Charles Ponsonby Moore, 10th Earl of Drogheda (1884–1957)
- Charles Garrett Ponsonby Moore, 11th Earl of Drogheda (1910–1989)
- Henry Dermot Ponsonby Moore, 12th Earl of Drogheda (born 1937)

The heir apparent is the present holder's son Benjamin Garrett Henderson Moore, Viscount Moore (born 1983). The next and last in remainder is the heir apparent's brother, Hon. Garrett Alexander Moore (born 1986).
