= Minister of Economic Warfare =

British government position during World War 2

The Minister of Economic Warfare was a British government position which existed during the Second World War. The minister was in charge of the Special Operations Executive and the Ministry of Economic Warfare.

== Ministers of Economic Warfare, 1939–1945 ==
- Ronald Cross (3 September 1939 – 15 May 1940)
- Hugh Dalton (15 May 1940 – 22 February 1942)
- Roundell Palmer, 3rd Earl of Selborne (22 February 1942 – 23 May 1945)

== Directors-General, Ministry of Economic Warfare ==
- Frederick Leith-Ross 1939–1942
- Henry Moore, 10th Earl of Drogheda 1942–1945

== See also ==
- Blockade of Germany (1939–45)
- Economic warfare
