= Weldon baronets =

Baronetcy in the Baronetage of Ireland

The Burdett, later Weldon Baronetcy, of Dunmore in the County of Carlow, is a title in the Baronetage of Ireland. It was created on 11 July 1723 for Thomas Burdett, who represented County Carlow and the borough of Carlow in the Irish House of Commons, with remainder, in default of male issue of his own, to the male issue of his sister Anne, wife of Walter Weldon. The sixth baronet was a colonel in the British Army and High Sheriff of Queen's County.

== Burdett, later Weldon baronets, of Dunmore (1723) ==
Escutcheon of the Weldon baronets

- Sir Thomas Burdett, 1st Baronet (1668–1727)
- Sir William Vigors Burdett, 2nd Baronet (1715–1798)
- Sir William Bagenal Burdett, 3rd Baronet (1770–1840)
- Sir Anthony Weldon, 4th Baronet (1781–1858)
- Sir Anthony Crossdill Weldon, 5th Baronet (1827–1900)
- Sir Anthony Arthur Weldon, 6th Baronet (1863–1917)
- Sir Anthony Edward Wolseley Weldon, 7th Baronet (1902–1971)
- Sir Thomas Brian Weldon, 8th Baronet (1905–1979)
- Sir Anthony William Weldon, 9th Baronet (born 1947)

The heir presumptive is the present holder's cousin Kevin Nicholas Weldon (born 1951). His heir apparent is his son Alexander Nicholas Weldon (born 1977).
