= Edward Moore, 5th Earl of Drogheda =

Anglo-Irish politician and peer (1701–1758)

The Right Honourable The Earl of Drogheda PC (Ire)

Member of Parliament for Dunleer
- In office 1725–1727 Serving with William Aston
- Preceded by: William Aston; Richard Tenison
- Succeeded by: Francis North; William Tenison

Personal details
- Born: Edward Moore; 1701 Ireland
- Died: 28 October 1758 (aged 56–57) Irish Sea
- Spouse(s): Lady Sarah Ponsonby (m. 1727; died 1736) Bridget Southwell (m. 1737; died 1758)
- Relations: Henry Moore, 4th Earl of Drogheda (brother)
- Occupation: Politician

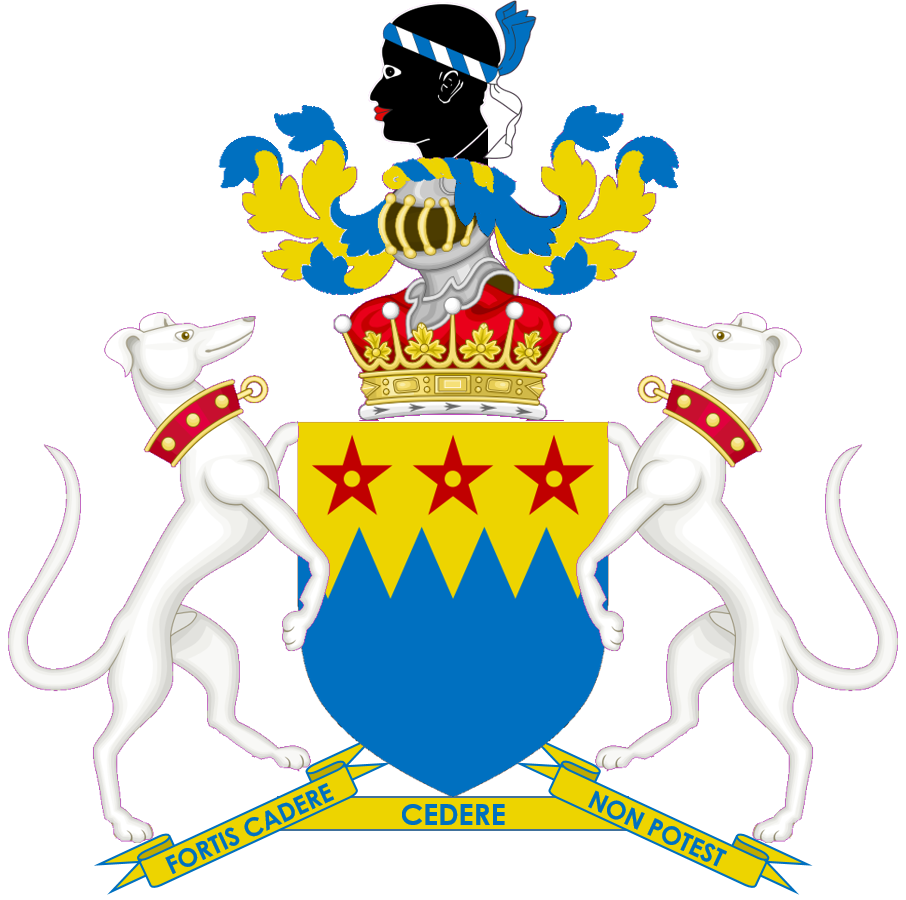
The armorial achievement of the Earls of Drogheda

Edward Moore, 5th Earl of Drogheda PC (I) (1701 – 28 October 1758) was an Anglo-Irish peer and politician.

== Early life ==
Moore was the second son of Charles Moore, Lord Moore, son of Henry Hamilton-Moore, 3rd Earl of Drogheda, and Jane Loftus, daughter of Lord Loftus. His elder brother, Henry Moore, 4th Earl of Drogheda, inherited their grandfather's title and estates at the age of 13, when their father and grandfather died in quick succession. Henry rapidly became a debauchee, and after squandering large sums, died at the age of 26, leaving Edward a heavily encumbered estate.

== Career ==
He served in the Irish House of Commons as the Member of Parliament for Dunleer between 1725 and 1727 when he succeeded to his elder brother's titles and took his seat in the Irish House of Lords. In 1748 he was invested as a member of the Privy Council of Ireland and made a Governor of Meath.

== Personal life ==
In 1727, Moore married Lady Sarah Ponsonby, a daughter of Brabazon Ponsonby, 1st Earl of Bessborough, and Sarah Margetson. Together, they were the parents of six sons and two daughters, including:

- Henry Moore, styled Viscount Moore (1728–1752), who died unmarried.
- Charles Moore, 1st Marquess of Drogheda (1730–1822), who married Lady Anne Seymour-Conway, daughter of Francis Seymour-Conway, 1st Marquess of Hertford.
- Hon. Ponsonby Moore (1736–1819), who married Hon. Elizabeth Moore, third daughter of Stephen Moore, 1st Viscount Mount Cashell, in 1768. After her death, he married Catherine Trench, a daughter of Frederick Trench and sister to Frederick Trench, 1st Baron Ashtown, in 1781.
- Hon. Edward Loftus Moore (1736–1758), a minister who died unmarried.
- Lady Sarah Moore, who married William Pole, of Ballyfin, third son of the antiquary Sir William Pole of Shute House, Devon. (Note: On the death of William Pole, he left his estate to the 3rd Earl of Mornington, who then changed his name to William Wellesley-Pole, 3rd Earl of Mornington.)

Following her death on 19 January 1736, Moore married Bridget Southwell (d. 1767), daughter of William Southwell and Lucy Bowen (daughter of William Bowen, of Ballyadams, Queen's County), on 13 October 1737. Together, they were the parents of:

- Hon. William Moore (1742–1762)
- Hon. Robert Moore (1743–1831), who married Margaret Stephenson, a daughter of James Stephenson. After the death of his first wife, he married Maria Josepha Falkiner, a daughter of Daniel Falkiner, in 1799.
- Lady Jane Moore, who married Rev. Henry Echlin, a son of Sir Henry Echlin, 1st Baronet.

Moore was lost in a storm at sea while travelling with his son Edward between Holyhead and Dublin in 1758 and was succeeded by his eldest surviving son, Charles, who created Marquess of Drogheda in 1791. His widow, the dowager Countess of Drogheda, died on 27 July 1767.

== See also ==
- List of people who disappeared mysteriously at sea

Parliament of Ireland
Preceded by William Aston; Richard Tenison	Member of Parliament for Dunleer; 1725–1727; With: William Aston	Succeeded by Francis North; William Tenison
Peerage of Ireland
Preceded by Henry Moore	Earl of Drogheda; 1727–1758	Succeeded by Charles Moore
