= Moore Abbey =

Headquarters of the Sisters of Charity in Ireland

- Moore Abbey, Monasterevin

- Location within Ireland

General information
- Architectural style: Gothic
- Location: Monasterevin; County Kildare; W34 E433; Ireland
- Coordinates: 53.1351°N 7.0636°W
- Year built: Late 1760s
- Client: The 6th Earl of Drogheda
- Owner: Muiríosa Foundation

Design and construction
- Architect: Christopher Myers

Website
- www.muiriosa.ie

Moore Abbey (Irish: Mainstir Uí Mhórdha) is a monastic house on the east bank of the River Barrow at Monasterevin in County Kildare, Ireland. It was formerly the seat of the Earls of Drogheda.

== History ==
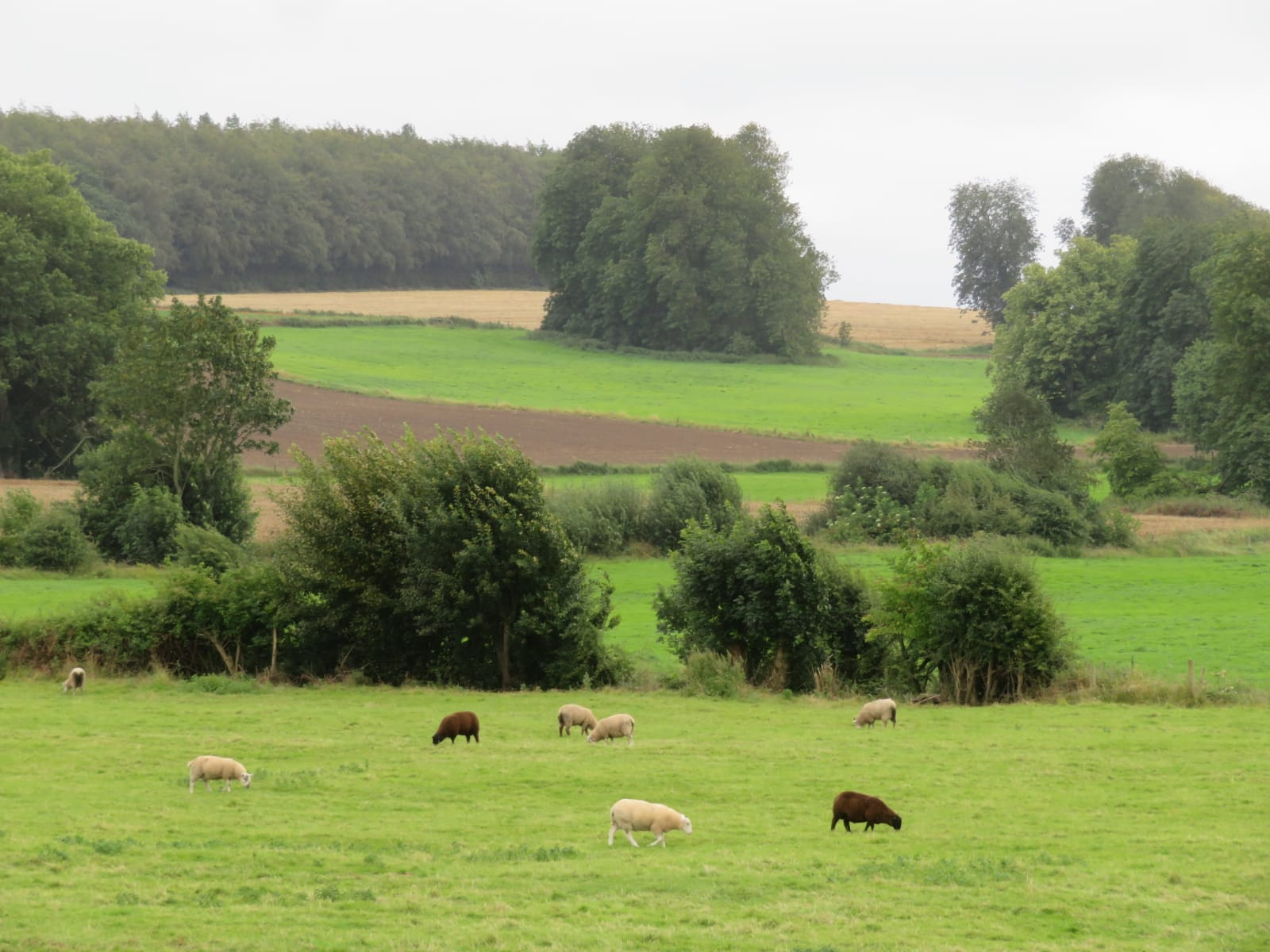
View south from Moore Abbey

Moore Abbey was designed by the English engineer Christopher Myers in the Gothic style and was built in the late 1760s for the 6th Earl of Drogheda (who later became Field Marshal The 1st Marquess of Drogheda). The 10th Earl of Drogheda abandoned the house after the First World War and it was leased to John, Count McCormack, the tenor, from 1925 to 1937. The 10th Earl then put the abbey up for sale shortly after Count McCormack moved out and in 1938 it became the Irish headquarters of the Sisters of Charity of Jesus and Mary, now known as the Muiríosa Foundation.
