= Henry Moore, 3rd Marquess of Drogheda =

Irish peer

The Most Honourable The Marquess of Drogheda KP, PC (I)
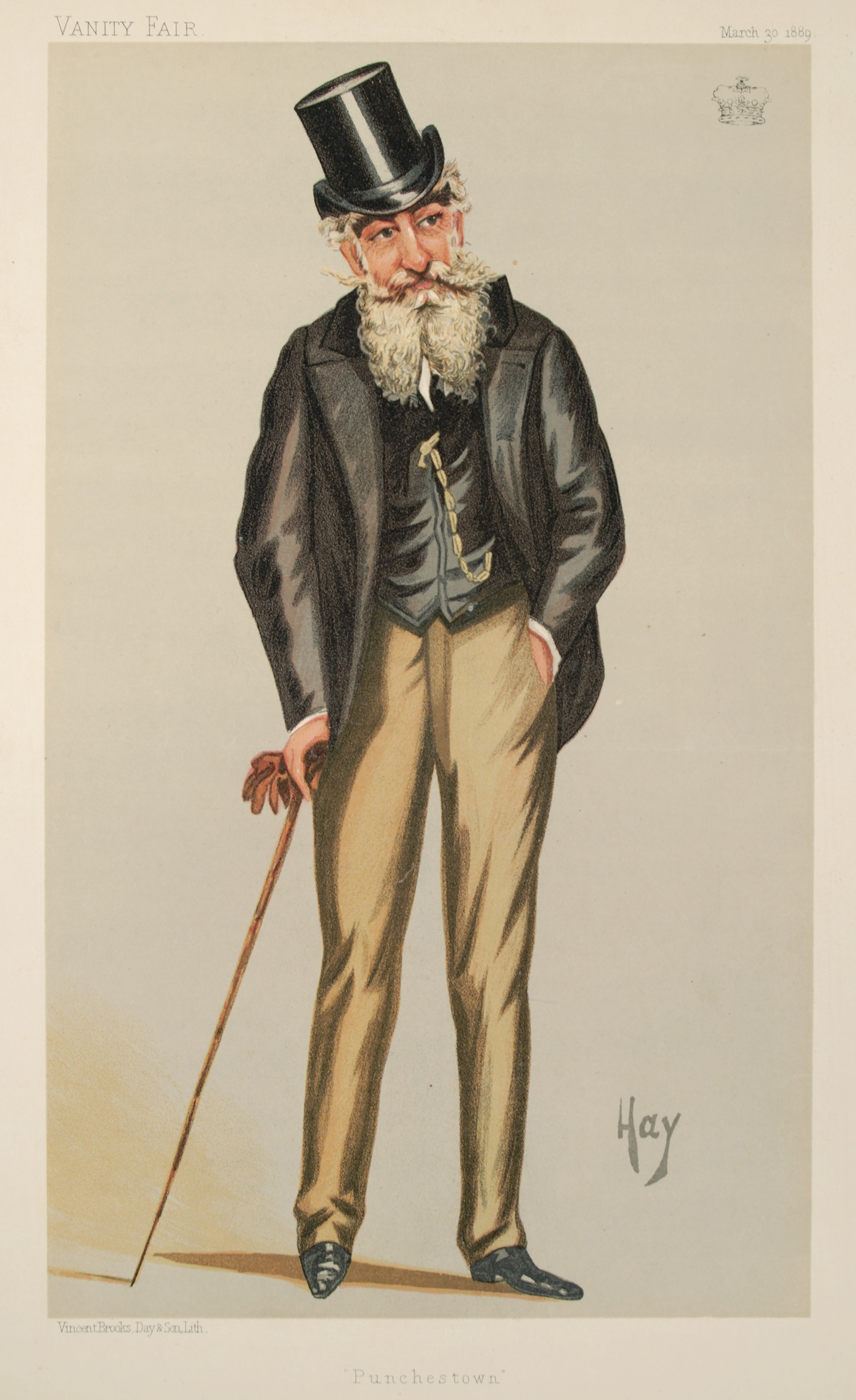
- 'Punchestown', Lord Drogheda as caricatured in Vanity Fair, March 1889.

Lord Lieutenant of Kildare
- In office 1874–1892
- Preceded by: The 3rd Duke of Leinster
- Succeeded by: The 5th Duke of Leinster

Personal details
- Born: Henry Francis Seymour Moore; 14 August 1825
- Died: 29 June 1892 (aged 66)
- Spouse: Hon. Mary Stuart-Wortley (after 1847)
- Relations: Charles Moore, 1st Marquess of Drogheda (grandfather); Henry Parnell, 1st Baron Congleton (grandfather)
- Parent(s): Lord Henry Seymour Moore; Hon. Mary Parnell

Henry Francis Seymour Moore, 3rd Marquess of Drogheda, KP, PC (I) (14 August 1825 – 29 June 1892), was an Irish peer, styled Viscount Moore until 1837.

== Early life ==
He was the only son of Lord Henry Seymour Moore, a younger son of Field Marshal The 1st Marquess of Drogheda, and The Hon. Mary Parnell, daughter of The 1st Baron Congleton, who was a great uncle of the Irish nationalist leader Charles Stewart Parnell. His father died a few days after his birth in August 1825. His mother remarried Edward Cole of Twickenham (a grandson of The 12th Earl of Derby), by whom she had two more children.

== Career ==
He became Marquess of Drogheda in 1837 on the death of his uncle, The 2nd Marquess of Drogheda, and owned 19,000 acres. He was appointed a Knight of the Order of St Patrick on 7 February 1868. He served as Lord Lieutenant of Kildare from 1874 until his death.

His uncle Charles, the second Marquess, had been insane for many years when he died. However, there is no evidence that Henry was similarly afflicted, although his maternal grandfather Lord Congleton committed suicide in 1842 after battling ill health and depression.

== Personal life ==
In 1847, he married The Hon. Mary Stuart-Wortley, daughter of The 2nd Baron Wharncliffe and his wife, Lady Elizabeth Ryder.

Lord Drogheda had no children and on his death the Marquessate became extinct; the title Earl of Drogheda passed to a cousin, Ponsonby Moore.

Honorary titles
Preceded by The 3rd Duke of Leinster	Lord Lieutenant of Kildare; 1874–1892	Succeeded by The 5th Duke of Leinster
Peerage of Ireland
Preceded by Charles Moore	Marquess of Drogheda; 1837–1892	Extinct
Preceded by Charles Moore	Earl of Drogheda; 1837–1892	Succeeded by Ponsonby William Moore
Peerage of the United Kingdom
Preceded by Charles Moore	Baron Moore; 1837–1892	Extinct
