= Lord Lieutenant of Kildare =

Ceremonial officer in Kildare, Ireland

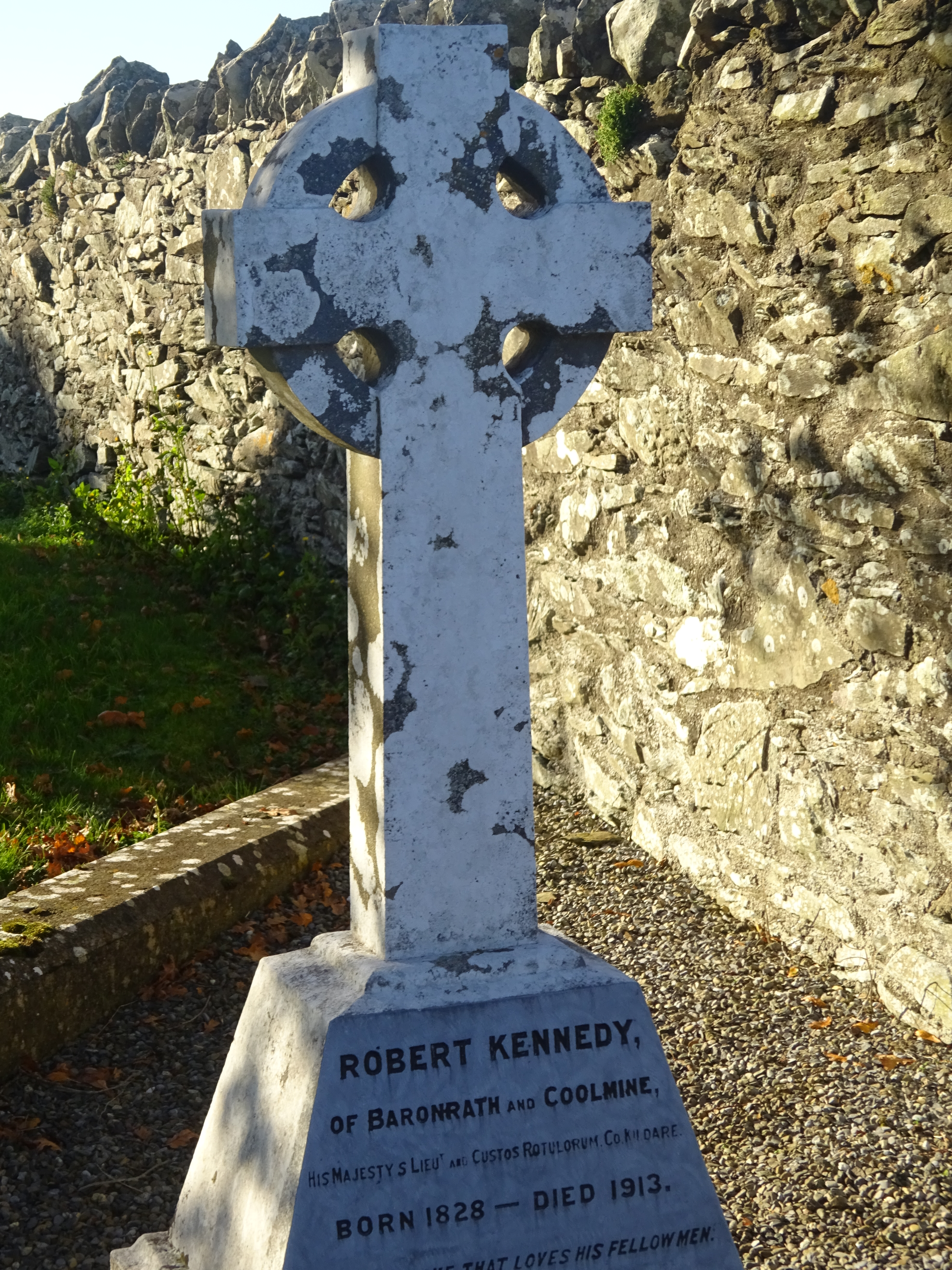
Grave of Robert Kennedy (of Baronrath); it describes him as "His Majesty's Lieut. and Custos Rotulorum, Co. Kildare."

This is a list of people who have served as Lord-Lieutenant of Kildare.

There were lieutenants of counties in Ireland until the reign of James II, when they were renamed governors. The office of Lord Lieutenant was recreated on 23 August 1831. The main function of the office was to raise, train and manage the local militia bodies, in line with the Militia (Ireland) Act 1802. Beyond that, the Lords Lieutenant had a figurehead function representing the monarch at the local level.

== Governors ==
- James FitzGerald, 1st Duke of Leinster 1761–1773
- William FitzGerald, 2nd Duke of Leinster 1773–1804
- John Wolfe 1803–1816
- Walter Butler, 1st Marquess of Ormonde 1816–1820
- Lord Henry Moore 1820–1825
- Augustus FitzGerald, 3rd Duke of Leinster 1825–1831

== Lord Lieutenants ==
- Augustus FitzGerald, 3rd Duke of Leinster 7 October 1831 – 10 October 1874
- Henry Moore, 3rd Marquess of Drogheda 4 December 1874 – 29 June 1892
- Gerald FitzGerald, 5th Duke of Leinster 5 July 1892 – 1 December 1893
- Robert Kennedy 24 February 1894 – 7 October 1913
- Sir Anthony Weldon, 6th Baronet 2 December 1913 – 29 June 1917
- Henry Moore, 10th Earl of Drogheda 23 April 1918 – 1922
