= Royal Irish Artillery =

The Royal Regiment of Irish Artillery
- Active: 1755–1801
- Country: Kingdom of Ireland
- Allegiance: Kingdom of Great Britain
- Branch: British Army
- Role: Artillery
- Engagements: American War of Independence; Irish Rebellion of 1798

The Royal Irish Artillery was an Irish regiment of the British Army in the 18th century. It was formed in 1755 as The Artillery Company of Ireland. The name was changed in 1760 to The Royal Regiment of Irish Artillery.

== History ==
In 1755, the Royal Regiment of Artillery, Woolwich, sent an officer, Captain John Stratton, with a small detachment to Dublin to establish a permanent Company of Artillery in Ireland. The following year, another commanding officer was sent along with 60 more non-commissioned officers and men.

Additional members were recruited all over Ireland and were trained in Dublin Castle and then in Woolwich. Parts of the Regiment were sent to Canada in 1777 with Major General John Burgoyne, taking part in the American War of Independence. In addition, some Royal Irish Artillery gunners were shipped directly to New York under Brigadier-General James Pattison.

The General's papers were reprinted by the New York State Historical Society in 1876, a detailed source of information on this subject. Pattison, being head of the British Artillery in North America during part of the American Rebellion, had much to say about his Irish. They were "his diminutive warriors", "bare breeched", "were lower than serpents". He said that they were "incorrigible, ill mannered, and unkempt". He told his recruiters to only raise units in England or Scotland and forget Ireland. When a large number of new Irish gunners coming into New York deserted, Pattison wrote, "it was bad enough that they had deserted but what was worse was that the rest didn’t go with them". When asked what to do with some new but mildewed uniforms, Pattison wrote, "give them to the Irish".

The regiment suffered heavily in the Battle of Castlebar, being forced to give ground in spite of its fierce resistance.

Yet in spite of all the derogatory remarks, the Royal Irish Artillery was awarded white leather stocks as a mark of their good gunnery. In 1801, following the Act of Union and the formation of the United Kingdom, the Royal Irish Artillery was absorbed as an integral part of the Royal Artillery and therefore ceased to exist. They became part of the 7th Battalion of The Royal Regiment of Artillery.

Buttons from the tunics of the Royal Irish Artillery have been found in Somerville, Massachusetts and upon the site of Fort George at Castin, Maine. The design of the button can still be seen on the shield at the centre of the 206 (Ulster) Battery, which is part of 105 Regiment Royal Artillery (Volunteers), a Territorial Army (reserve) regiment in the British Army.
