= Richard Aherne =

Irish actor, sometimes Richard Nugent

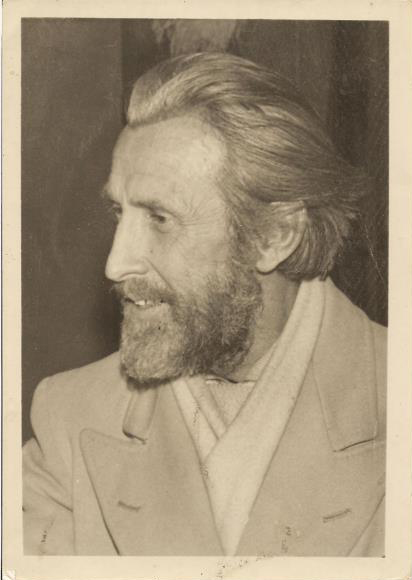
Richard Aherne

Richard Aherne (born Vincent Richard Ahern; 19 March 1911 – 8 June 2002) was an Irish actor. He is sometimes credited as Richard Nugent.

He was born in Dublin, Ireland, the son of William Ahern and Mary Brophy Ahern of Ross, County Meath. He died in Los Angeles, California, United States, aged 91.

== Selected filmography ==
- The Purple V (1943) – British Radio Operator in Africa (uncredited)
- Sahara (1943) – Capt. Jason Halliday
- The Story of Dr. Wassell (1944) – British Convoy Commander (uncredited) (unbilled)
- The Pearl of Death (1944) – Bates
- The Master Race (1944) – Sergeant O'Farrell
- Of Human Bondage (1946) – Emil Miller
- My Hands Are Clay (1948) – Sean Regan
- Christopher Columbus (1949) – Vicente Yañez Pinzon
- D-Day the Sixth of June (1956) – Grainger, Associated Press Correspondent (uncredited)
- Pardners (1956) – Chauffeur
- Around the World in Eighty Days (1956) – Minor Role (uncredited)
- The Buster Keaton Story (1957) – Franklin
- Death Wish 4: The Crackdown (1987) – The Real Nathan White (final film role)
