= The King v Arundel =

1617 English court case

- Court: Court of King's Bench
- Full case name: Rex and the Lord Hunsdon v The Countess of Arundel, and the Lord William Howard
- Decided: Trinity Term 1617

Court membership
- Judges sitting: Sir Edward Coke, Sir Henry Hobart

Case opinions
- Decision by: Hobart

Keywords
- enrolled bill rule; private bill

The King v Arundel (officially Rex and the Lord Hunsdon v The Countess of Arundel, and the Lord William Howard), 80 ER 268 (K.B. 1617), [1616] EWHC Ch J11, (1617) Hobart 109 was a notable case in English law that established the enrolled bill rule. The ruling arose from a dispute of the meaning and effect of a private bill which had passed Parliament in the 35th regnal year of Henry VIII (approximately 1542) which had resolved a land dispute involving William Dacre, 3rd Baron Dacre. By the reign of James I, the Dacre claims had passed to the Howard family (William Dacre's grandson George having died without surviving legitimate issue and George's sisters all having married sons of Thomas Howard, 4th Duke of Norfolk); the named defendants are Anne Howard, Countess of Arundel née Dacre, widow of the Duke of Norfolk's eldest son and heir Philip Howard, 13th Earl of Arundel, and her brother-in-law Lord William Howard.

The case held that the only valid record of an Act of Parliament was that which had been "delivered into chancery" (that is, the final approved Act) and that it is conclusive as to the regularity of its enactment. Following this case, the law was established that the regularity of the process by which the Act was drawn up cannot be challenged in court. Nor can the law that existed before the new law be used to qualify or modify the approved Act. "Nothing turns upon what the law was before the statute."
