= Henderskelfe Castle =

Ruined castle in England

- North Yorkshire, England
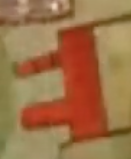
- Henderskelfe Castle on a 1694 map by Nicholas Hawksmoor

Site information
- Type: Castle
- Open to the public: [Technically] Yes
- Condition: Destroyed

Location
- Shown within North Yorkshire.
- Coordinates: 54°7′17″N 0°54′21″W
- Grid reference: grid reference SP00109848

Site history
- Built: c. 1330–50
- In use: c. 1330–50 – 1699
- Materials: Stone
- Events: Construction of Castle Howard

Henderskelfe Castle, or Henderskelf Castle in older texts, was a Medieval castle in Henderskelfe, North Yorkshire. It stood on what is now the site of Castle Howard, a large stately home.

== History ==
Pottery fragments from the 13th and 14th centuries have been found near the castle grounds, suggesting that the site of the castle was occupied from at least the 1200s.

The estate was owned by the Greystoke family during the early 14th century, who built Henderskelfe Castle around c. 1330–1350. The castle was in ruins by 1359 and must have been rebuilt at least once before the fortifications were added in 1500. John Leyland, visiting sometime between c. 1538 and 1543, described the castle as "a fine quadrant of stone having a 4-toures buildid castelle like, though no ample thing".

In 1577, the 4th Duke of Norfolk's third son, Lord William Howard, married his step-sister Elizabeth Dacre, youngest daughter of the 4th Baron Dacre. She brought with her the sizable estates of Henderskelfe Castle and Naworth Castle.

The castle was rebuilt in 1683 but burnt down in 1693 before the entire village of Henderskelfe, including the castle, was demolished between 1699 and 1720 to make way for Castle Howard; the site of Henderskelfe now lies within the gardens of Castle Howard.

== Excavations ==
The site of Henderskelfe was excavated on Time Team (series 10, episode 11) in 2003 with the team using Hawksmoor's 1694 map of the estate to identify the location of the lost village. Excavations continued for several years after and they identified the completeness of the demolition of the castle and the associated village.
