= Anne Howard, Countess of Arundel =

English noblewoman and poet (1557–1630)

Anne Howard
- Countess of Arundel
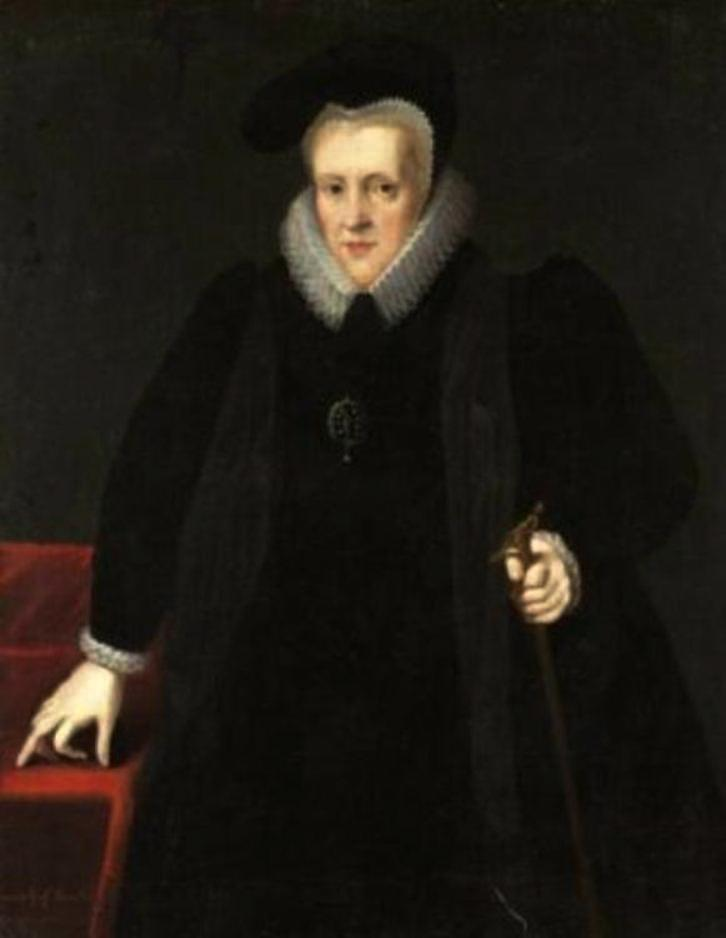
- Anne Howard, Countess of Arundel
- Born: Anne Dacre; 21 March 1557; Carlisle, Cumberland, England
- Died: 19 April 1630 (aged 73); Shifnal Manor, Shropshire
- Buried: Fitzalan Chapel, Arundel Castle, Arundel, Sussex
- Spouse: Philip Howard, 1st Earl of Arundel
- Issue: Thomas Howard, 2nd Earl of Arundel
- Father: Thomas Dacre, 4th Baron Dacre
- Mother: Elizabeth Leyburne

Anne Howard, Countess of Arundel (née Dacre; 21 March 1557 – 19 April 1630), was an English poet, noblewoman, and religious conspirator. She lived a life devoted to her son, Thomas Howard, and religion, as she converted to the illegal and underground Catholic Church in England in 1582, in defiance of the Protestant Queen Elizabeth I's policy of Caesaropapism. She was known to be a "woman of strong character, and of religious desposition... whose influence soon made itself felt upon her husband... the increasing seriousness of his thoughts led him in the direction of Romanism...". She was also known as an author of Christian poetry and for literary works written about her.

== Family background ==
Anne was born in Naworth Castle, Carlisle, England, on 21 March 1557, the eldest daughter of Thomas Dacre, 4th Baron Dacre of Gilsland, and Elizabeth Leyburne of Cumbria. Following Anne, her mother gave birth to three more children: a son George (but sometimes called Francis), and two sisters, Elizabeth and Mary. George was born in 1562, followed by Mary in 1563, and Elizabeth in 1564. In 1567, Anne's father died; soon after, her mother remarried, becoming the third wife of Thomas Howard, 4th Duke of Norfolk. In September 1567, when Anne was about 10 years old, her mother died during childbirth.

After the death of their mother, Anne and her siblings were essentially brought up and educated by their maternal grandmother, Lady Mounteagle, who had formerly been married to Sir James Leyburn. Her mother and grandmother were both devout Catholics, which had a strong influence on her religious beliefs and actions. Growing up, Anne and her siblings were instructed on religion by a Catholic priest, despite Elizabeth I's accession in 1558 and her reversal of Mary I's counter-Reformation.

== Married life ==
Anne's stepfather, Thomas Howard, eventually obtained the wardship of all the Dacre children. He arranged that George (Francis) was to marry Margaret, the daughter of his second wife. The three Dacre girls were arranged to marry Thomas's three sons: Philip, Thomas, and William.

In 1569, it was arranged for Anne to marry Thomas's eldest son, her stepbrother, Philip Howard, the Earl of Surrey, the Duke's heir. Since both children were only 12 years old at the time, the ceremony was repeated two years later when both parties reached the age of consent. Philip eventually became the 1st Earl of Arundel. Anne's sister, Elizabeth, married Lord William Howard. Her other sister, Mary, was arranged to marry Lord Thomas Howard, but died before she was “marriageable”. Her stepfather and now father-in-law, a Catholic with a Protestant education, tried to discourage Anne's decidedly Catholic leanings.

Philip and Anne saw little of each other in the early days of their marriage, partly because he was a student at Cambridge, and so Anne came under the protection of Philip's maternal grandfather, Henry FitzAlan, 12th Earl of Arundel. Following Arundel's death, on 24 February 1580, Anne became the Countess of Arundel. She returned to her husband's London house, where they began to live together.

Throughout the beginning of their marriage, Anne and Philip moved continually. They constantly moved from "Audley End to Arundel House, London, to Nonsuch, with occasional visits to the Charterhouse, then known as Howard House" until the early 1580s, where they finally settled in Arundel Castle in Sussex.

== Religion and conversion ==
As a child, Anne learned from her grandmother "a high self esteem and affection for Catholik Religion... great compassion of sick, or otherwise afflicted persons... and a great kindness of the Society of Jesus". During the sixteenth and seventeenth centuries, laws against Catholicism increased and resulted in harsh punishments. Despite those laws, Anne converted to Catholicism in 1582 at the hands of a Marian priest in her Arundel Castle in Sussex. Once word got out about her conversion from Protestantism to Catholicism, Queen Elizabeth I showed strong disapproval and Anne was put under house arrest in the home of Sir Thomas Shirley. While under house arrest in Shirley's home for one whole year, Anne gave birth to her first child, Elizabeth in 1583.

After Anne was released, she reunited with Philip, but he was put under house arrest in 1584 after also converting to Roman Catholicism. However, unlike his wife, Philip tried to escape from his order of house arrest and flee to France in 1585. During that escape attempt he was captured at sea and imprisoned in the Tower of London indefinitely and fined £10,000. Elizabeth I also barred Anne from living in London and so she rented a house in Finchingfield, Essex. There, she gave birth to her second child, Thomas, the future 14th Earl of Arundel. Unfortunately, Philip was never able to meet his first and only son because he died in the Tower on 19 October 1595 - Anne took a vow of chastity after his death and never remarried.

== Widowed life ==
Once declared a widow in 1595, all of Philip's possessions that were supposed to be Anne's were withheld from her. She had to pay off debts and secure an income for her family by selling her land. For a long time, Anne and her two children lived in poverty, hardly able to support themselves. Years later, after a hard life struggling to pay off debt, Anne was finally able to receive the legacies left her by her husband, enabling her to give her children Elizabeth and Thomas a proper life. She eventually moved back to Naworth Castle, Carlisle, where she had been born and raised.

From then on Anne spent her days in church attendance and other religious observances. She had a passion for helping people in need, especially people who were sick. In December 1603 Anthony Standen wrote to the Jesuit Robert Persons about the religion of Anne of Denmark. He hoped the Countess of Arundel and other Catholic women would be able to convert her to Catholicism.

She died of natural causes on 19 April 1630 at Shifnal Manor, Shropshire, aged 73, and was buried next to her husband inside the Fitzalan Chapel at their former home, Arundel Castle in Sussex. In a 1995 homily at Arundel Cathedral, Cardinal Basil Hume said, "I believe that Anne herself achieved the highest degree of sanctity."

== Literary works ==
Anne Howard wrote many letters, poems, and journal entries throughout her life, including accounts of her and her husband's lives. Her writing was a "compilation of reminiscences, some of which represent her attempts to recall early stages in her life, while others record the day-to-day life in her household, when she practiced a disciplined and practical piety. Events are overlaid with the emotions that remained with the countess, as in the account 'Of the Queen's hatred towards her'".

Poems by Anne about her imprisoned and deceased husband survive, expressing the sorrow and "submission" of her husband, whom she refers to as "my sonne". She also wrote about her grandmother who raised her. All of her poetry was published under her own name.

== Ancestry ==
Ancestors of Anne Howard, Countess of Arundel

16. Humphrey, 1st Lord Dacre of Gilsland
8. Thomas, 2nd Lord Dacre
17. Mabel Parr
4. William, 3rd Lord Dacre
18. Sir Robert de Greystoke
9. Elizabeth Greystoke
19. Elizabeth, daughter, of Edmund Grey, 1st Earl of Kent
2. Thomas, 4th Lord Dacre of Gilsland
20. John Talbot, 3rd Earl of Shrewsbury
10. George Talbot, 4th Earl of Shrewsbury
21. Catherine, daughter of Humphrey Stafford, 1st Duke of Buckingham
5. Lady Elizabeth Talbot
22. William, 1st Lord Hastings
11. Lady Anne Hastings
23. Katherine, daughter of Richard Neville, 5th Earl of Salisbury
1. Anne Howard, Countess of Arundel
24. James Leyburn
12. Thomas Leyburn
25. Isabel, daughter of Robert de Bellingham
6. Sir James Leyburn
26. Sir John Pennington, of Muncaster
13. Margaret Pennington
27. Isabel, daughter of John de Broughton
3. Elizabeth Leyburne
28. John Preston
14. Sir Thomas Preston
29. Margaret, daughter of Richard Redmayne, of Harewood Castle, West Riding
7. Helen Preston
30. William Thornburgh
15. Anne Thornburgh
31. Elizabeth, daughter of Thomas Broughton
