= Naworth Castle =

Castle in Cumbria, England

- Brampton, Cumbria, England
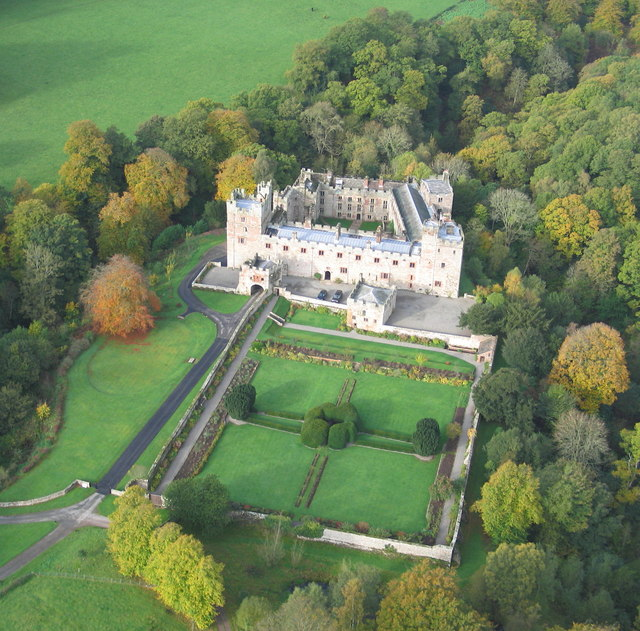
- Aerial photograph of Naworth Castle

Location
- Location in the former Carlisle district, Cumbria Location in Cumbria, England
- Coordinates: 54°57′20″N 2°41′20″W
- Grid reference: grid reference NY559625

Site history
- Materials: Stone

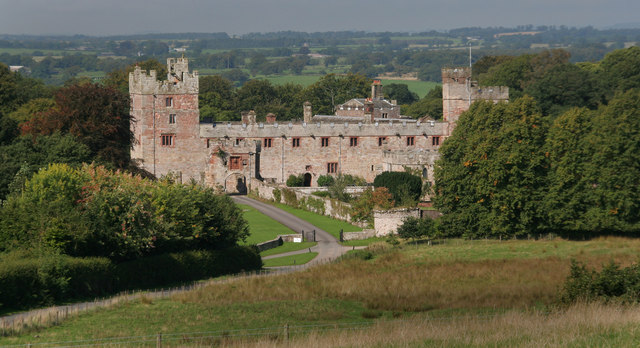
Naworth Castle in 2009

Naworth Castle, also known or recorded in historical documents as "Naward", is a castle in Cumbria, England, near the town of Brampton. It is adjacent to the A69 road from Newcastle upon Tyne to Carlisle, about 2 miles (3.2 km) east of Brampton. It is on the opposite side of the River Irthing to, and just within sight of, Lanercost Priory where the Dacre and Howard families are buried or have their memorials, although some are buried at Carlisle Cathedral. Naworth was the seat of the Barons Dacre and is now that of their cognatic descendants, the Earls of Carlisle, who belong to the prominent Howard family. It is a Grade I listed building and was an impregnable fortress for the Dacres, where they retreated in times of trouble.

== History ==
Formerly a stronghold of the Lord Wardens of the Marches, Naworth is a medieval castle set in border country. The castle is thought to have mid 13th-century origins (possibly a peel tower), in the form of a square keep and bailey. The current castle dates back to the early 14th century. It was first mentioned in 1323, and in 1335, a licence to crenellate was granted to Ralph Dacre during the reign of Edward III. Subsequently, it was extended by generations of Dacres. The family was long established in Cumberland, where they were famous for their exploits in checking the depredations of the Scots. Through marriage, the Dacres were related to many other northern families including the Nevilles, the Percy family, the Greystoke family, the Greys, the Parrs, the Harington Family and, the de Vaux family. Unfortunately for the Dacres, due to marriage links, they became heavily embroiled in the feuds within the Neville family and between the Percy and Neville families that ended up with the Wars of the Roses.

Thomas Dacre (1467–1525), who commanded the reserve of the English army at the Battle of Flodden, was known as "the Builder Dacre." He built the castle's gateway and placed over it his coat of arms with the Dacre family motto below: Fort en Loialte (Norman-French: "Strong in Loyalty").

Nearby, Lanercost Priory was dissolved in 1543. As part of the barony of Gilsland the manor of Walton was granted to the Dacre family. They refused to yield Gilsland and Naworth to the King, although in 1552 they agreed to exchange some lands at Bewcastle for others at Papcastle.

In the late 16th century, Naworth came under the control of the Duke of Norfolk. In 1566 Thomas Dacre, 4th Baron Dacre died. In his will, he left his estates to his only son, George Dacre, 5th Baron Dacre, and thereafter to his brothers, including Leonard Dacre. Following his death, his widow, Elizabeth Dacre (née Leyburne), married Thomas Howard, 4th Duke of Norfolk who became stepfather to the four Dacre children (George Dacre plus his three sisters, Anne, Mary, and Elizabeth).

Within a year of marrying the Duke of Norfolk, Elizabeth Dacre died in childbirth. The Duke then applied for wardship of his four Dacre stepchildren. Two years later, the young George Dacre died in an accident and, as a minor, was without issue. His inheritance, which included Naworth, was given to his sisters as co-heiresses to his estates. The girls’ stepfather, the Duke of Norfolk, then married two of the three Dacre heiresses (Anne and Elizabeth) to two of his sons – Philip Howard and William Howard. Mary Dacre was due to marry his other son, Thomas Howard, however she died before any marriage could take place. Thus the Howard name came into the Dacre family, along with the title of Earl of Carlisle.

However, the sisters’ uncle, Leonard Dacre (younger brother to the 4th Baron Dacre), believed their inheritance should have come to him, having been named in his brother's will. However after becoming involved in the Northern Rebellion against Queen Elizabeth, Leonard Dacre was forced to flee from England to Scotland and then to Flanders where he died in poverty in 1573. The Howards had the premier dukedom (Norfolk) in England and the premier earldom (Arundel) and with Leonard Dacre having fled abroad, Naworth Castle and the Dacre estates became the property of the son of the Duke of Norfolk, Lord William Howard, through his marriage to Elizabeth Dacre (nicknamed "Bess of the Broad Apron" thanks to the size of the vast northern estates which she had inherited). Amongst their many properties was Castle Howard, but the principal family seat today is Naworth Castle, whilst Castle Howard is now held by a cadet branch of the family.

== Castle and gardens ==
The castle itself not only embodies centuries of tradition and cultural heritage but was home to both the Dacres and Howards. After its initial build in the 13th century, it changed over the centuries, experiencing periods of building and development as well as periods of destruction. Presently it has an exceptional and unusual combination of Pre-Raphaelite interiors, original medieval chambers and large, forbidding dungeons (the latter being four dark apartments, three below, and one above up a long staircase. They still remain in their original state).

One of Naworth's greatest claims includes having the largest Great Hall in the north. Its windows look on to the courtyard and its fireplace, 15ft wide, is arched like a stone bridge. It also has beautiful Flemish and French tapestries.

It formerly had free standing heraldic wooden, sculptures called the “Dacre Beasts” which stood in the hall from the early 16th century until 2000 when they were purchased by the Victoria and Albert Museum. They were originally situated in the Great Hall, where they stood under a ceiling painted with portraits of the kings and queens of England. Having been commissioned by Thomas Dacre circa 1520, all four figures are believed to have been carved from a single Cumbrian oak tree from the Naworth estate. Centuries later they were rescued from Naworth's fire in 1844.

The beasts (each 6 ft tall) are intended to represent heraldic supporters of the Dacres and their spouses. The beasts are identified as follows:

- The red bull – a heraldic supporter of Thomas, 2nd Lord Dacre. The bull holds a banner of Lord Dacre: Gules, three Escallops Argent. Dugdale claimed that this coat derived from an ancestor present at the siege of Acre in 1291 and the crusades to the Holy Land. One suggestion was that this was how the Dacre family got their surname - d'Acre.
- The dolphin or salmon - represented Thomas Dacre's wife, Elizabeth de Greystoke (whom Dacre was pre-contracted to). She was carried off by him from Brougham Castle in 1488 where she was a ward of the King and in the care of Henry Clifford, 10th Baron Clifford. The dolphin/salmon holds a banner showing the arms of Grymthorp/Grimthorpe for Greystoke: Barry argent and azure three chaplets of roses gules (Grimthorpe is in the Yorkshire Wolds. The Greystoke family, though taking their name from estates in Cumberland, possessed large Yorkshire holdings).
- The black gryphon - represented Thomas’ ancestry including Ralph Dacre, 1st Baron Dacre, who built Naworth in 1335 and also the Dacre ancestry going back to the beginning of the Norman period (the Dacre barony having originally derived from the de Vaux family, who came over to England with William the Conqueror). The gryphon holds a banner of : three cushions d'argent (three silver-coloured diamonds).
- The white ram - represented Ralph's wife, Margaret de Moulton, whom Dacre carried off from Warwick Castle where she was a ward of Edward II and in the care of the Beauchamp family. The ram is the supporter of the de Moulton (or 'Mouton', French for sheep and hence the ram) coat of arms, which can be seen on the banner : shield and banner silver were, with three bars red.

The figures are unique survivors of English heraldic woodwork which conceal a coded history of the Dacre family (including their elopements) and are regarded as fine examples of a lost world of English medieval and Tudor heraldic carving. The beasts became more famous in the 19th century through the production of prints, appealing strongly to Victorian fantasies of medieval romance. They are said to have been the inspiration for John Tenniel's illustrations for Alice's Adventures in Wonderland.

It is likely that the castle's 18th-century walled garden lies within the boundaries of the original moat. In June 1568, when Mary, Queen of Scots was at Carlisle Castle, it was mentioned that "Naward Castle is moated about, and much stronger for her detention." Although Naworth was "strong, and fit" for Mary, there was no store of wine and beer at the castle.

Further additions were made in the early 17th century for Lord William Howard when he took up residence with his children and grandchildren at Naworth. His heir, Philip, was the grandfather of Charles Howard, 1st Earl of Carlisle, and his younger son Francis was the ancestor of the Howards of Corby.

=== 1844 fire and 19th century rebuilding ===
On Saturday, 18 May 1844, the castle caught fire, possibly as a result of the ignition of some soot in the flue of the Porter's Lodge. The structure's lack of internal walls allowed the fire to spread rapidly, and it remained unchecked until it reached the northern wing. Although some property was saved, by the time two fire engines had arrived by train from Carlisle, most of the roof had collapsed and the fire had spread to nearly every room on the three sides of the quadrangle. Water had to be passed in buckets from a rivulet at the foot of a steep hill on the north side of the castle. "Belted Will's Tower" was saved, while the fire continued until around one o'clock on Sunday morning, when it was brought under control. Subsequent restoration was undertaken by the architect Anthony Salvin.

Following the fire, some rooms changed including the former chapel which is now the library. Post the 1844 fire, much of the castle's decor was influenced by 19th century Pre-Raphaelite designs. In the current library there is a bas-relief over the fireplace, designed by Edward Burne-Jones and Sir Edgar Boehm, depicting the Battle of Flodden with Lord Thomas Dacre leading a valiant charge.

=== Pre-Raphaelite links ===
George Howard, 9th Earl of Carlisle was a friend and important patron to a number of artists in the Pre-Raphaelite circle, especially Burne-Jones, as well as those in the Arts and Crafts movement such as Walter Crane and early aesthetic artists like Edward Lear.

Pre-Raphaelites like Burne-Jones, William Morris, and Philip Webb would often visit Naworth to work with Howard as well as producing designs and buildings within the local region. They sometimes holidayed there, often taking their families with them. George Howard's painting of William Morris' daughters, "May and Jenny Morris at Naworth Castle", was composed at Naworth.

As well as Naworth Castle and Castle Howard, George Howard lived at 1 Palace Green, Kensington, a house designed for him by Webb and decorated by Burne-Jones and Morris. Webb later built two houses for his Naworth Castle Estate, Four Gables and Green Lane House, the latter intended for the vicar. Webb's plan for the local St Martin's Church, Brampton is unique amongst Victorian Churches, with the body of the church being almost square. It is the only church designed by the Pre-Raphaelite architect Philip Webb, and contains one of the most exquisite sets of stained glass windows designed by Burne-Jones, and executed in the William Morris studio.

During a visit by William Morris at the castle in August 1874, he wrote a letter to Aglaia Coronio "...all is very pleasant. Ned & I pass our mornings in a most delightful room in one of the towers that has not been touched since William Howard of Queen Elizabeth's time lived there: the whole place is certainly the most poetical in England."

=== 20th and 21st Centuries ===
From 1939 to 1940, Naworth was occupied by Rossall School from Fleetwood in Lancashire, which had been evacuated from its own buildings by various government departments.

It is currently occupied by the Hon. Philip Howard, younger brother and heir presumptive of the 13th Earl of Carlisle.

== Notable owners/residents ==
- Ralph Dacre, 1st Baron Dacre
- Philippa de Neville
- Humphrey Dacre, 1st Baron Dacre
- Joan Dacre, 7th Baroness Dacre
- Thomas Dacre, 2nd Baron Dacre
- William Dacre, 3rd Baron Dacre
- Magdalen Dacre
- Anne Howard, Countess of Arundel
- Georgiana Howard, Countess of Carlisle
- George Howard, 9th Earl of Carlisle

== Miscellanea ==
- The castle has a well-preserved priest hole.
- Francis Galton, cousin of Charles Darwin, is said to have invented the concept of correlation at Naworth. Having been given permission to ramble through the castle's estate, he was forced to stop and shelter from the rain. It was during this rainstorm that he recognised a common thread in three different scientific problems he was studying.
- Sir Walter Scott described the castle as:
  "one of those extensive baronial seats which marked the splendour of our ancient nobles, before they exchanged the hospitable magnificence of a life spent among a numerous tenantry, for the uncertain honours of court attendance, and the equivocal rewards of ministerial favour."
- The Black Candle (1991 - TV film) and Jane Eyre were filmed at Naworth.

== See also ==
- Grade I listed buildings in Cumbria
- Listed buildings in Brampton, Carlisle
- Castles in Great Britain and Ireland
- List of castles in England
