= Henderskelfe =

Civil parish in North Yorkshire, England

Coordinates: 54.122°N 0.912°W

- Civil parish
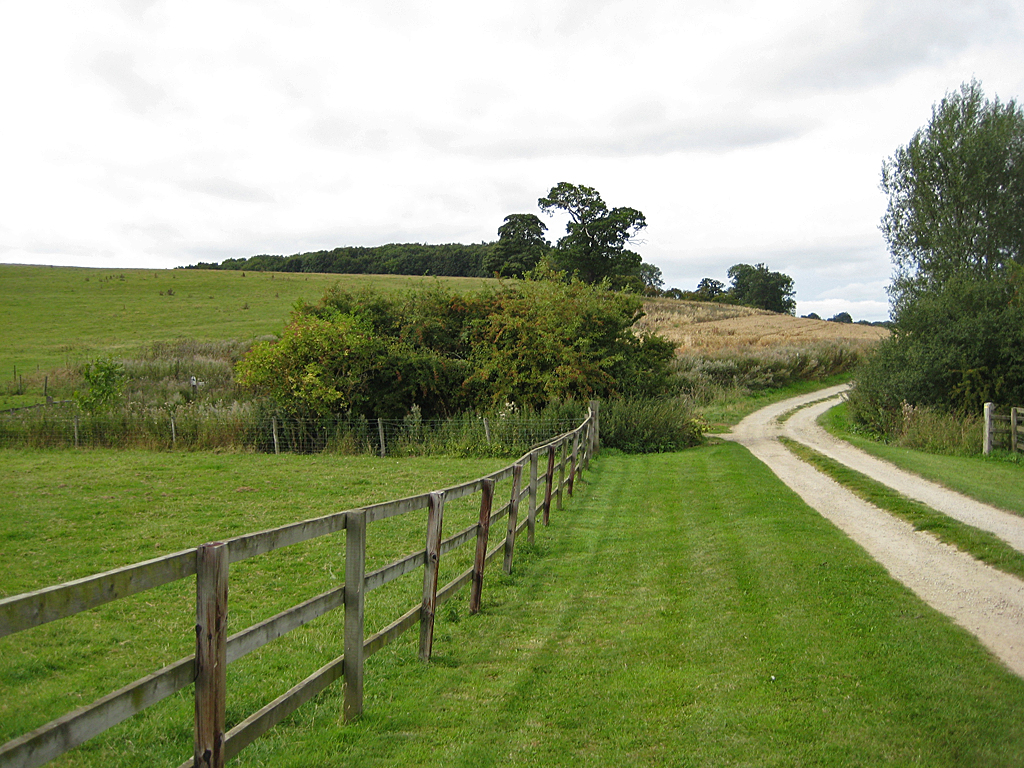
- Centenary Way footpath in Henderskelfe parish

- Location within North Yorkshire
- Population: 50 (2015) NYCC
- OS grid reference: SE719700
- Unitary authority: North Yorkshire
- Ceremonial county: North Yorkshire
- Region: Yorkshire and the Humber
- Country: England
- Sovereign state: United Kingdom
- Post town: YORK
- Postcode district: YO60
- Police: North Yorkshire
- Fire: North Yorkshire
- Ambulance: Yorkshire
- UK Parliament: Thirsk and Malton

Henderskelfe is a civil parish in North Yorkshire, England. The parish does not contain any villages, though it is named after a previous settlement and castle which occupied the land on which Castle Howard is now built. Historically the area was a township in the ecclesiastical parish of Bulmer, however it has been its own civil parish since 1866.

== History ==
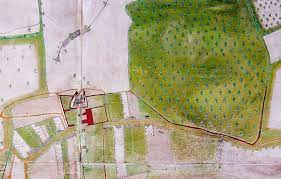
A 1694 map of the area around Henderskelfe Castle produced by Nicholas Hawksmoor

Originally, the area had been called Hinderskelfe, and the manor lands of Hinderskelfe stretched between Stamford Bridge, what is now Castle Howard and Lastingham. Mentioned in the Domesday Book of 1086, the area was home to a village and a church, both now lost, with Castle Howard being built on top of the village, and Henderskelfe/Hinderskelfe Castle. As the church had been destroyed, no clergy were assigned to the area, and it became known as an extra-parochial area. The site of the rectory and the church now lie underneath the South Lake, and the garden respectively on the Castle Howard estate. In 1846, a private bill was passed in the House of Commons and the House of Lords, which effectively swapped the two parcels of land in Henderskelfe, with land in Sheriff Hutton; the Archbishop of York owned the parcel of land beneath the lake, and no longer needed it. The township of Henderskelfe remained in the ecclesiastical parish of Bulmer for marriages births and baptisms after it had been created as a civil parish.

Henderskelfe Castle was built during the reign of Edward III to a quadrangular design, though it was listed as being in ruins by 1359.

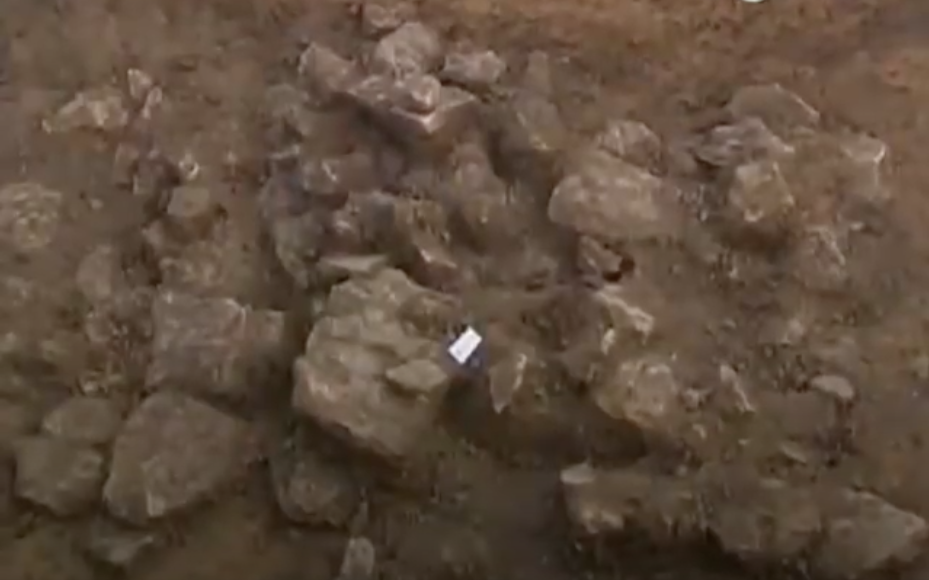
Foundations of a 16th-century house, Henderskelfe

Leland states in Collectanea, that in 1070, a Scottish raiding party under King Malcolm, "...came to a place called Hinderskelfe and slew some English nobility." At the time of the Domesday survey, the land belonged to Berengar of Tosny, who died without issue and so it passed to his sister, Adeliza, who married Roger Bigod. Henderskelfe passed to the monarchy in 1306, when Bigod died, and all his honours were transferred to the crown. The manor was owned by the Greystoke family in the 16th and 17th centuries. Henderskelfe Castle and village were rebuilt in 1683, but destroyed by fire in 1693. The building of Castle Howard started c. 1699, and some of the external walls by the gate were built from stone sourced from the ruined castle. Henderskelfe Castle and village were both located immediately west of Ray Wood, which still exists today. A map of 1694, drawn a year after fire destroyed the castle, shows the layout of the village and castle.

The name of Henderskelfe has been suggested by Smith to be an Old Norse combination of Hildar and skjálf; a female personal name and either shelf or seat. However, Morris suggests the name stems from Hundred-Hill, as the site was the meeting place of the wapentakes of Ryedale and Bulmer. The remains of the village of Hinderskelfe/Henderskelfe were demolished when the current Castle Howard buildings were erected in 1699. A map of 1690 shows 24 houses present, though no document records what happened to the villagers. Beresford suggested that the villagers were given houses in either Coneysthorpe or Welburn. The area was classified as a township until 1866, when it was redesignated as a civil parish. Previous to this, the township of Henderskelfe was in the parish of Bulmer, and consisted of 1,500 acres (610 ha), most of which was given over to the Castle Howard estate. By 1872, the parish area was defined as being 1,620 acres (660 ha), which had grown to 1,705 acres (690 ha) by 1890.

In 1987, the whole of the parish became part of the newly created Howardian Hills Area of Outstanding Natural Beauty. The Centenary Way long-distance footpath crosses the eastern side of the parish.

== Governance ==
Henderskelfe was historically in the wapentake of Bulmer, and part of the Malton Rural District in the North Riding of Yorkshire. It was part of the Ryedale district between 1974 and 2023. It is now administered by North Yorkshire Council. The parish forms part of the Thirsk and Malton Constituency for national government purposes.

In the 2001 census, the parish details were listed as being "below the Office for National Statistics threshold data" (the population was less than 100), so the details were contained within the adjacent parish of Coneysthorpe.

Population of Henderskelfe 1801–2015
1801	1811	1821	1831	1841	1851	1861	1871	1881	1891	1901	1911	1921	1931	1951	1961	1971	2001	2011	2015
137	137	159	150	157	148	157	162	132	108	99	100	72	89	85	94	65	N/A (Note: The population of Henderskelfe was included with that of the neighbouring parish of Coneysthorpe)	60 (Note: Estimated population.)	50 (Note: Estimated population.)

== Notable residents ==
- Sir Humphrey Lascelles died in Henderskelfe in 1102.
- William Dacre, 3rd Baron Dacre, lived at Henderskelf [sic], after having to surrender his other estates. He had "embraced Catholicism", and so during the reign of Queen Elizabeth I, he was persecuted for his beliefs, and briefly imprisoned in the Tower of London.

== See also ==
- Listed buildings in Henderskelfe
