= United States Congressional Joint Committee on Enrolled Bills =

The Joint Committee on Enrolled Bills was a joint committee of the United States Congress operating from 1789 to 1876. It was one of the first standing committees established by Congress, having been created July 27, 1789 during the 1st Congress.

== History ==
The enrollment process dates to the first years of Congress, with procedures to ensure its integrity initially laid out in Jefferson's Manual: "When a bill has passed both Houses of Congress, the House last acting on it notifies its passage to the other, and delivers the bill to the Joint Committee on Enrollment." From 1789 to 1876, the House and Senate had joint rules with similar requirements in relation to enrollment. In particular, these rules directed the Clerk of the House of Representatives and the Secretary of the Senate to enroll bills and mandated a review (and any corrections, if necessary) by a joint committee, which would then report to the respective chambers.

In 1876, the rules for the joint committee lapsed, and the Committee on Enrolled Bills reverted to separate House and Senate standing committees. The committee continued to be referred to as a "joint committee," even though both the House and Senate committees separately supervised the enrolling of bills originated in its own house. Under the Legislative Reorganization Act of 1946 the functions of the Committee on Enrolled Bills were incorporated into those of the House Administration Committee. This lasted until the beginning of the 107th Congress, when jurisdiction over enrollment was transferred to the House Clerk and laid out in House Rules. The Senate transferred authority over the enrollment process to the Secretary of the Senate in 1945 upon adoption of S.Res. 64 (79th Congress), and is now incorporated in Senate Rule XIV.

== Jurisdiction ==
The Joint Committee on Enrolled Bills was established with the responsibility for the enrollment of engrossed bills. The enacting resolution which created the committee stated:

After a bill shall have passed both Houses, it shall be duly enrolled on Parchment by the Clerk of the House of Representatives or the Secretary of the Senate, as the bill may have originated in one or the other House, before it shall be presented to the President of the United States. . . . When bills are enrolled they shall be examined by a joint committee for that purpose, who shall carefully compare the enrollment with the engrossed bills as passed in the two Houses, and, correcting any errors that may be discovered in the enrolled bills, make their report forthwith to their respective Houses.

An enrolled bill or resolution is the form of a measure finally agreed to by both chambers of Congress. This is different than an engrossed measure, which refers to the form a bill takes when it first passes its chamber of origin, including any amendments, before being referred to the second chamber for concurrence. Today, enrollment occurs in the chamber where the measure originated and is carried out by enrolling clerks under the supervision of the House Clerk and the Secretary of the Senate. Enrolled bills and joint resolutions are signed by the presiding officers of each chamber (or their designees), as required by 1 U.S.C. § 106, and are presented to the President by the House Clerk or Secretary of the Senate, depending on the chamber of origination.

== See also ==
- United States House Committee on Enrolled Bills
- United States Senate Committee on Enrolled Bills
