= Rising of the North =

Catholic rebellion against Elizabeth I

| Date | 9 November 1569 – 21 January 1570 |
| Location | Northern England |
| Result | Elizabethan victory: Elizabeth's authority strengthened; Aristocracy of the North weakened |

Belligerents
| (Scotland) Partisans of Mary, Queen of Scots (England) Northern English Catholics | (England) Elizabeth I (England) English and Welsh Protestants (Scotland) Scottish Protestants |

Commanders and leaders
| Earl of Westmorland; Earl of Northumberland (executed); Countess of Westmorland Countess of Northumberland (1538-1596) Aftermath: Leonard Dacre | Earl of Sussex; Baron Clinton; Earl of Warwick; Aftermath: Baron Hunsdon |

Strength
| 9,000 | 22,000 |

The Rising of the North of 1569, also called the Revolt of the Northern Earls, Northern Rebellion or the Rebellion of the Earls, was an unsuccessful attempt by Catholic nobles from Northern England to depose Queen Elizabeth I and replace her with Mary, Queen of Scots.

== Background ==
Elizabeth I succeeded her half-sister Mary I as queen of England in 1558. Elizabeth's accession was disputed due to the questioned legitimacy of the marriage of her parents (Henry VIII and Anne Boleyn), and Elizabeth's own questioned legitimacy due to the Act of Succession 1536. Under Henry VIII and his advisor Thomas Cromwell, power was gradually shifted from regional institutions to royal control. This course was encouraged by Elizabeth's counsellors such as William Cecil and a policy of centralization was the approach favoured by Elizabeth herself at least in regards to the northern border region.

Opponents of Elizabeth looked to Mary, Queen of Scots, the descendant of Henry VIII's sister Margaret. The claims were initially put forward by Mary's father-in-law, King Henry II of France, and Mary upheld them after her return to Scotland in 1561.

Many English Catholics, then a significant portion of the population, supported Mary's claim as a way to restore Roman Catholicism. This position was especially strong in Northern England, where several powerful nobles were Roman Catholics; there had been similar risings against Henry VIII; the Pilgrimage of Grace of 1536 and Bigod's Rebellion of 1537. Supporters of Mary hoped for aid from France (among Scots) and possibly Spain (among English). Mary's position was strengthened by the birth of her son, James, in 1566 but weakened again when she was deposed in July 1567. Following this, she fled to England and at the time of the Rising was in the custody of the Earl of Shrewsbury, on Elizabeth's orders.

== Rebellion under Northumberland and Westmorland ==
Blessed Thomas Plumtree

Priest, Rector, Chaplain to the Rising of the North
- Born: c. 1520; Lincolnshire, England
- Died: 4 January 1570 (aged 49 - 50); In the marketplace at Durham Castle, Durham, England
- Honored in: Roman Catholic Church
- Beatified: 29 December 1886 by Pope Leo XIII
- Feast: 4 January, 1 December as one of the Martyrs of Oxford University
- Attributes: Rosary

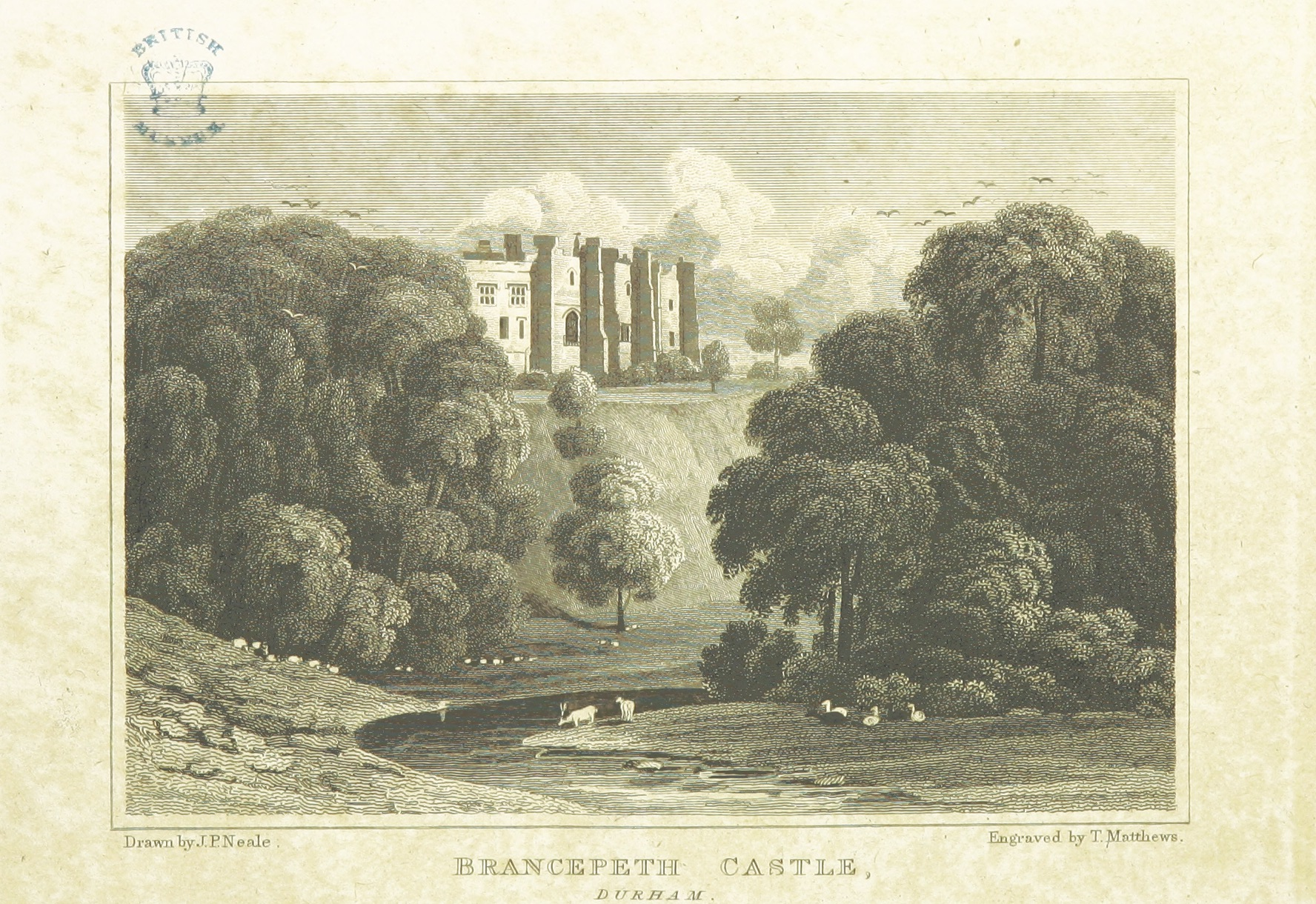
Brancepeth Castle

The rebellion was led by Charles Neville, 6th Earl of Westmorland, and Thomas Percy, 7th Earl of Northumberland. Seven hundred soldiers assembled at Brancepeth Castle. In November 1569 Westmorland and Northumberland occupied Durham. Thomas Plumtree (see right) celebrated Mass in Durham Cathedral. From Durham, the rebels marched south to Bramham Moor, while Elizabeth struggled to raise forces sufficient to confront them. She sent the Earl of Sussex, Lord Hunsdon, and Ralph Sadler to York.

The rebels held Hartlepool hoping for support by sea. Hearing of a large force being raised by the Earl of Sussex, the rebels abandoned plans to besiege York, and instead besieged Barnard Castle held by George Bowes for 11 days. Some of the defenders changed sides, jumping over the castle walls to join the rebels. Others opened a gate for the rebels. Bowes surrendered and was allowed to retire leaving his possessions behind. The castle was thoroughly looted.

The rebels proceeded to Clifford Moor, but found little popular support. Sussex marched out from York on 13 December 1569 with 10,000 men against the rebels' 6,000, and was followed by 12,000 men under Baron Clinton. The rebel earls retreated northward and finally dispersed their forces, fleeing into Scotland.

== Leonard Dacre's resistance ==
A questionable role in the rebellion was played by Leonard Dacre, an early sympathiser of Mary. At the outbreak of the rebellion, he travelled to Elizabeth's court at Windsor to claim the heritage of his young nephew, the 5th Baron Dacre. After the latter's untimely death in 1569, this had descended to his sisters, all married to sons of Thomas Howard, 4th Duke of Norfolk. Dacre returned to Northern England, ostensibly a faithful partisan of Elizabeth, but his intentions remain unclear.

After the retreat of the rebels, he seized Greystoke Castle and fortified his own Naworth Castle, where he gathered 3,000 Cumbrian troops and tried to keep up the appearance of good relations with the Queen. He held out against a siege of the royal army under Baron Hunsdon but then attacked the retreating army at Gelt River. Though Hunsdon was outnumbered, he charged Dacre's foot with his cavalry, killing 300–400 and capturing 200–300 men. Dacre escaped via Scotland to Brussels, where he died in exile.

== Fugitives in Scotland ==
Some of the rebels escaped into Scotland, including two of the leaders, the Earls of Northumberland and Westmorland. An English spy Robert Constable visited castles near the border and spoke to some of the fugitives. He wrote to Ralph Sadler describing his conversations at Ferniehirst Castle and the whereabouts of other rebels. Regent Mar wrote that Agnes Gray, Lady Home, had been a busy worker to receive the rebels.

The Earl of Northumberland was captured by James Douglas, 4th Earl of Morton, and turned over to Elizabeth in 1572, who had him beheaded at York. After having been hidden at Ferniehirst Castle, Westmorland escaped to Flanders, where he died impoverished. His family lost their ancestral homes and his wife, Jane Howard, also fled to the Continent. She lived the rest of her life under house arrest. Her brother, the Duke of Norfolk, was first imprisoned, then pardoned. He was imprisoned again following the Ridolfi plot in 1571 and finally executed in 1572. Norfolk's treason charges included "comforting and relieving of the English rebels that stirred the Rebellion in the North since they have fled out of the realm."

== Reprisals ==
Queen Elizabeth declared martial law, exacting terrible retribution on the ordinary folk of the Yorkshire Dales, despite the lack of any popular support for the Earls' Rising, with her demand for at least 700 executions. The victims of this purge were, as a contemporary account said "wholly of the meanest sort of people", so that hardly a village escaped the sight of a public hanging. Altogether, 600 supporters of Mary were executed, while many others fled into exile. George Bowes was Provost Marshal, travelling to serve justice.

In February 1570, Bowes, Sussex, and Thomas Gargrave wrote to Elizabeth asking that she grant pardons, and let former rebels become "good subjects". A pardon for the ordinary husbandmen or humbler sort was issued on 18 February, in part to stifle a second rebellion led by Leonard Dacre. A second pardon was issued on 4 March for Dacre's men. On 22 March, the remaining (wealthier) rebels were allowed to submit to Elizabeth's agents. They had to attend a sermon and swear an oath of loyalty to the crown. Landowners had to "compound", paying a fine based on the value of their property holdings. Some of the money was used to pay the soldiers. Trials under common law for the wealthier rebels not included in these pardons were held at York, Durham, and Carlisle. Sussex and others negotiated pardons and fines for some of the condemned men.

In 1570, Pope Pius V had tried to aid the rebellion by excommunicating Elizabeth and declaring her deposed in the papal bull Regnans in Excelsis, but the document did not arrive until the rebellion had been suppressed. The bull gave Elizabeth more reason to view Catholics with suspicion. It inspired conspiracies to assassinate her, starting with the Ridolfi plot.

In 1587, Elizabeth brought Mary, Queen of Scots, to trial for treason; she was convicted by the court and executed.

== See also ==
- Desmond Rebellions
- Prayer Book Rebellion
- Pilgrimage of Grace
- Tripartite Indenture
