= Elizabeth Leyburn =

English noblewoman

- Duchess of Norfolk
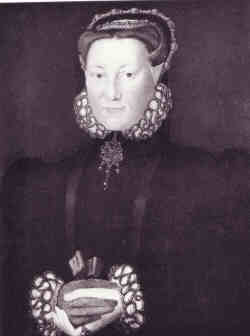
- Portrait of Elizabeth Leyburn attributed to Hans Eworth, c.1560
- Born: 1536
- Died: September 4, 1567 (aged 30–31); Kenninghall, Norfolk
- Spouses: Thomas Dacre, 4th Baron Dacre; Thomas Howard, 4th Duke of Norfolk
- Issue: Francis Dacre; Anne Howard, Countess of Arundel; George Dacre, 5th Baron Dacre; Mary Dacre; Elizabeth Dacre
- Father: Sir James Leyburn
- Mother: Helen Preston

Elizabeth Leyburn, Duchess of Norfolk (1536 – 4 September 1567, Kenninghall, Norfolk), was a member of the English nobility. She first married Thomas Dacre, 4th Baron Dacre; following his death in 1566, she secretly married Thomas Howard, 4th Duke of Norfolk. She was his third wife.

== Family ==
Elizabeth was born in 1536, the daughter of Sir James Leyburn of Cunswick, Westmorland, and his wife Helen Preston. The latter was the child of Thomas Preston and Anne Thornburgh. She had one sister, Anne, who married William Stanley, 3rd Baron Monteagle, by whom there was a daughter, Elizabeth.

Several members of the Leyburn (also written as Leybourne and Leyburn) family were recusants, and James Leyburn, Elizabeth's great-nephew, was executed as "a catholic traitor" in 1583.

== Marriages and issue ==
Elizabeth married twice. She married her first husband, Thomas Dacre, 4th Baron Dacre of Gilsland in 1555. The marriage produced five children:

- Francis Dacre (died in infancy)
- Anne Dacre (21 March 1557 – 19 April 1630), married Philip Howard, 20th Earl of Arundel, by whom she had issue.
- George Dacre, 5th Baron Dacre (1560 – 17 May 1569), died aged nine, two years after his mother.
- Mary Dacre (4 July 1563 – 7 April 1578) married Thomas Howard, later 1st Earl of Suffolk (1561–1626).
- Elizabeth Dacre (12 November 1564 – 1639), married Lord William Howard, by whom she had issue.

There was disagreement between Elizabeth and the Dacres as to her husband's will, which settled his lands on his son and brothers, limiting their inheritance to heirs male. Elizabeth allegedly felt aggrieved on behalf of her daughters, but according to her brother-in-law Leonard Dacre, Elizabeth herself received more "than ever anye the wyves of the auncestors of the said Lorde Dacre had."

Six months after her husband died on 25 July 1566, Elizabeth married Thomas Howard, 4th Duke of Norfolk on 29 January 1567, becoming his third wife. The marriage ceremony was conducted quietly in the London home of her mother. It was the duke's intention that his new stepchildren should marry his own children by his former wives, as Anne, Mary and Elizabeth subsequently did.

== Death and legacy ==
On 4 September 1567, just over seven months after her marriage, Elizabeth died in childbirth at Kenninghall, Norfolk; the baby, whose sex is not known, also died. It seems that, although Elizabeth was devoutly Catholic, her husband, who was also a Catholic but had been raised as a Protestant would not allow her access to a Catholic priest to administer the sacraments as she lay dying in labour:

the Duchesse . . . desir'd to have been reconciled by a Priest, who for that end was conducted into the garden, yet could not have access unto her, either by reason of the Duke's vigilance to hinder it, or at least of his continual presence in the chamber at that time.

The Duke was granted wardship of her children two months after her death Elizabeth's son, George, who had succeeded his father as 5th Baron Dacre, died at the age of nine in 1569. Norfolk later arranged the marriages of her three daughters to his own sons by his former wives. In 1571, Anne married her stepbrother Philip Howard, later 20th Earl of Arundel (1557–1595); before 9 May 1577, Mary had married Thomas Howard, later 1st Earl of Suffolk (1561–1626), her stepbrother; and on 28 October 1577 Elizabeth married Lord William Howard (1563–1640), of Naworth Castle, Cumberland, and of Henderskelfe Castle, Yorkshire, the Duke's third son.

Elizabeth's daughter Mary Howard died on 7 April 1578 at the age of fourteen, but her eldest child, Anne Howard, survived until 1630. The third daughter Elizabeth, gained the nickname "Bess of the Broad Apron", thanks to the size of the estates which came to her.

Elizabeth Leyburn was, according to her daughter Anne's biographer, ‘Daughter of Sir James Labourn a Knight much esteem'd and honour'd in Lancashire. For her Beauty, Person, Wit, and Discretion, she was qualify'd to wear a Crown.'

== Sources ==
- G. E. Cokayne, The Complete Peerage
- Mosley, Charles, editor, Burkes Peerage, Baronetage, Knightage, 107th edition, 3 Volumes, Vol.1, p. 1013
- Treharne, Elaine (5 August 2011). ""Tristis Amor": An unpublished love letter from Lady Elizabeth Dacre Howard to Sir Anthony Cooke". Renaissance Studies. 26 (5): 673–690. doi:10.1111/j.1477-4658.2011.00765.x. S2CID 190695372.
