= Leonard Dacre =

English gentry and rebel

Leonard Dacre (by 1533 – 12 August 1573) was an English nobleman, one of the promoters of the Northern Rebellion against Queen Elizabeth.

== Life ==
He was the second son of William Dacre, 3rd Baron Dacre of Gilsland and brother of Thomas Dacre, 4th Baron Dacre. He is estimated to have been born by 1533. His family, pre-eminent in Cumberland, was among the oldest and most powerful on the northern border.

He attended Parliament as knight of the shire for Cumberland in 1558, 1559 and 1563. He became deeply implicated in the project for the liberation of Mary, Queen of Scots, to whom he wrote friendly letters in 1566. On 17 May 1569 his nephew, George Dacre, 5th Baron Dacre was accidentally killed, in his minority, by the fall of a wooden vaulting-horse at Thetford, Norfolk. George was then in ward to Thomas Howard, 4th Duke of Norfolk; and his three sisters, coheiresses to his estates, were married to the three sons of their guardian, the Duke of Norfolk. Leonard Dacre felt angry and slighted that a large patrimony should legally descend to his nieces.

On the outbreak of the rebellion of 1569, Dacre went to court, and Queen Elizabeth, although she had heard that he had been secretly associated with the rebel earls, saw him at Windsor. He professed himself to be a faithful subject and returned to the north avowedly as an adherent of Elizabeth. Curtis C. Breight sees Dacre as "the best example of maneuvering a magnate into rebellion." In late November 1569, Thomas Radclyffe, Lord President of the North, listed Dacre among the "evil counselors" of the rebels although Dacre was not with them at Durham.

The disorderly flight of the rebels from Hexham convinced him that their cause was desperate. He therefore tried to consolidate a position, seized Greystoke Castle and other houses belonging to the Dacre family, and fortified Naworth Castle as his own inheritance. He gathered together three thousand troops, borderers and Dacre loyalists.

On 24 December 1569, he was actually commended by Thomas Radclyffe, 3rd Earl of Sussex, lieutenant-general of the army of the north, for his honourable service against the rebels. For the Council of the North, Henry le Scrope, 9th Baron Scrope of Bolton was more cautious. On 20 January 1570, he wrote to Cecil that he had received the lord-lieutenant's orders for taking Dacre into custody but that it would be hard to winkle him out of Naworth. Accordingly, Scrope tried to induce him to go to Carlisle, to hold a consultation on the state of the country. Dacre was too wary to leave his stronghold and replied that he was confined to his bed by an ague but added that if Scrope and his colleagues would take dinner at Naworth, they should have his company and the best advice that his simple head could devise.

On 15 February, Henry Carey, 1st Baron Hunsdon, who was at Berwick, received the queen's orders to apprehend Dacre. The battle which decided Dacre's fortune took place on 20 February. At dawn Lord Hunsdon and Sir John Forster came before Naworth Castle but found it so strongly defended that they determined to march to Carlisle to join the force under Lord Scrope. Dacre followed them for four miles (6 km), to the banks of the Gelt River. His infantry charged Hunsdon's forces, at what is now called the Battle of Gelt Bridge. 'The Dacre tenantry rose splendidly to the occasion on behalf of their ancestral lords, giving what Hunsdon himself described as 'the proudest charge upon my shot that ever I saw'.' However, their attack was repulsed, and Hunsdon, although outnumbered by a factor of two, charged Dacre's foot with his cavalry, killing between 300 and 400 of the rebels and taking between 200 and 300 prisoners. Dacre escaped towards Liddesdale, despite a close pursuit.

Dacre fled to Bedrule Castle in Scotland, and is said to have sat in a convention at Leith with the Scottish nobles in April 1570. Soon afterwards, he retired to Flanders, and in a letter from Francis Norton on 18 September 1571, he is stated to have applied to the Duke of Alva for arms. In June 1572 he was at Mechlin. In the same year he wrote to Jane Dormer, Duchess of Feria, to urge Philip II of Spain to take more energetic means relative to England, as the refugees were without hope. He was then receiving a pension from Philip of one hundred florins per month.

A Latin epitaph upon a monumental stone formerly visible in the church of St. Nicholas at Brussels records that he died in that city on 12 August 1573, then about 40.
