= United States House Committee on Enrolled Bills =

The United States House Committee on Enrolled Bills is a former standing committee of the United States House of Representatives.

The House standing Committee on Enrolled Bills was a result of the dissolution of the old Joint Committee on Enrolled Bills. The Joint Committee on Enrolled Bills was established on July 27, 1789, with the responsibility for the enrollment of engrossed bills. The enacting resolution states the following:

After a bill shall have passed both Houses, it shall be duly enrolled on Parchment by the Clerk of the House of Representatives or the Secretary of the Senate, as the bill may have originated in one or the other House, before it shall be presented to the President of the United States. ... When bills are enrolled they shall be examined by a joint committee for that purpose, who shall carefully compare the enrollment with the engrossed bills as passed in the two Houses, and, correcting any errors that may be discovered in the enrolled bills, make their report forthwith to their respective Houses.

In 1876 the joint rules of Congress were allowed to lapse, and although the committee continued to be referred to as a "joint committee," it consisted thereafter of a separate committee in each house, each supervising the enrolling of bills originated in its own house. Under the Reorganization Act of 1946 the functions of the Committee on Enrolled Bills were incorporated into those of the House Administration Committee. The Joint Committee on Enrolled Bills has since that date been composed of three members from the House Administration Committee and three members from the Senate Committee on Rules and Administration.

== See also ==
- Enrolled bill
- Enrolled bill rule
