= Thomas Dacre, 4th Baron Dacre =

English politician (1527–1566)

Thomas Dacre, 4th Baron Dacre of Gilsland, 8th Baron Greystoke (c. 1527 – 1 July 1566) was an English Member of Parliament and after his father's death a peer and major landowner in the counties of Cumberland, Yorkshire and Northumberland.

== Early life ==
Born about 1527, Dacre was the eldest of the five sons of William Dacre, 3rd Baron Dacre (c. 1493 – 1563), by his marriage to Elizabeth Talbot, a daughter of George Talbot, 4th Earl of Shrewsbury and of Anne Hastings, a daughter of William Hastings, 1st Baron Hastings. His father was Captain of Norham Castle, Steward of Penrith, Warden of the West Marches 1527–1534 and 1555–1563, and Governor of Carlisle. One of his brothers was Leonard Dacre.

The young Dacre was knighted in 1547. He married firstly Lady Elizabeth Neville, the sixth daughter of Ralph Neville, 4th Earl of Westmorland, by his marriage to Lady Catherine Stafford, the second daughter of Edward Stafford, 3rd Duke of Buckingham. There were no children of the marriage.

In 1553 he was elected to the House of Commons of England as one of the two Members of Parliament for Cumberland.

== Later life and death ==
He married secondly Elizabeth Leyburn (1536–1567), the eldest daughter of Sir James Leyburne of Cunswick, Westmorland, by whom he had two sons: Francis, who died in infancy, and George (c. 1561 – 17 May 1569); and three daughters: Anne (21 March 1557 – 19 April 1630), Mary (4 July 1563 – 7 April 1578), and Elizabeth (born 12 December 1564).

Dacre succeeded his father as Baron Dacre on 18 November 1563, but survived him for less than three years and was never summoned to parliament.

Ferguson's A History of Cumberland notes the demise of the Dacre family which followed:

Among the great families of Cumberland the martial house of Dacre stands out the most prominent. The death, in 36 Henry VI., of the last of these, Thomas Dacre by name, brought about a remarkable severance of the estates and honours...

After Dacre's death on 1 July 1566, his widow remarried Thomas Howard, 4th Duke of Norfolk, but she died in childbirth on 4 September 1567, so Dacre's young orphaned children were left as members of the Duke's household. Dacre's only surviving son died in 1569, when the barony of Dacre, although claimed by Dacre's brother Leonard, was determined by Commissioners swayed by the Duke to have fallen into abeyance, leaving Dacre's three daughters as co-heiresses. By the age of fourteen, each of the three had been married to one of their step-brothers, the sons of the Duke. In 1571, Anne married Philip Howard (1557–1595), later 20th Earl of Arundel; before 9 May 1577, Mary had married Thomas Howard (1561–1626), later 1st Earl of Suffolk; and on 28 October 1577 Elizabeth married Lord William Howard (1563–1640), of Naworth Castle, Cumberland, and of Henderskelfe Castle, Yorkshire, the Duke's third son.

Dacre's daughter Mary Howard died on 7 April 1578 at the age of fourteen, but his eldest child, Anne Howard, survived until 1630. His middle daughter, Elizabeth, gained the nickname "Bess of the Broad Apron", thanks to the size of the estates which came to her.

== Notes ==
Peerage of England
Preceded by William Dacre	Baron Dacre; Baron Greystoke; 1563–1566	Succeeded by George Dacre
