= Magdalen Dacre =

16th and 17th-century English noblewoman and Catholic recusant

- Viscountess Montagu
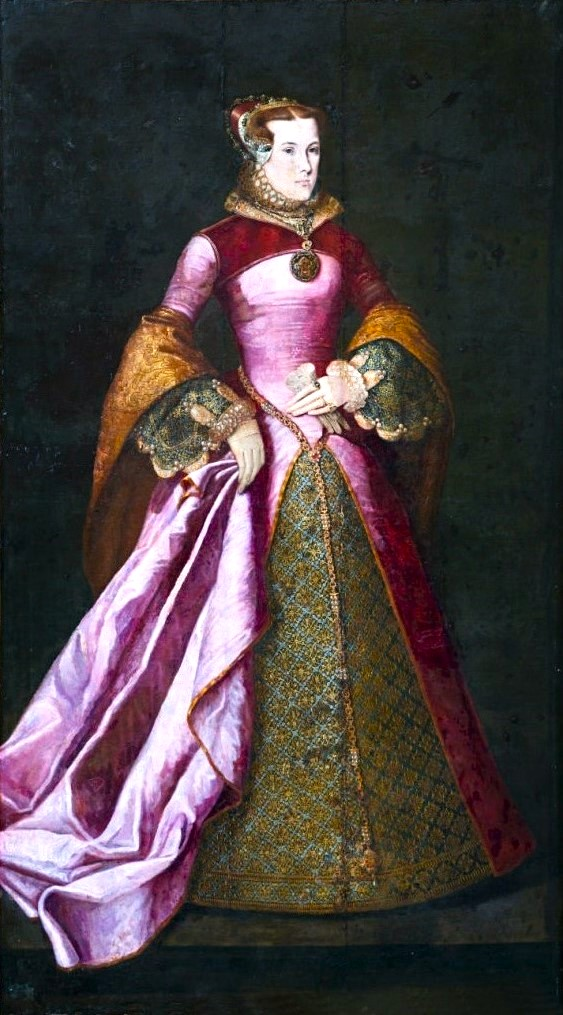
- Effigy of Magdalen Dacre on her alabaster tomb in Easebourne Church
- Born: January 1538; Naworth Castle, Cumberland, England
- Died: 8 April 1608 (aged 70); Battle Abbey, Sussex
- Noble family: Dacre
- Spouse: Anthony Browne, 1st Viscount Montagu
- Issue: Philip Browne; Sir Henry Browne; George Browne; Sir Anthony Browne; Jane Browne; Mary Browne; Elizabeth Browne; Mabel Browne; Thomas Browne; William Browne
- Father: William Dacre, 3rd Baron Dacre
- Mother: Elizabeth Talbot
- Occupation: Maid of Honour

Magdalen Dacre, Viscountess Montagu (January 1538 – 8 April 1608) was an English noblewoman. She was the daughter of William Dacre, 3rd Baron Dacre of Gilsland, and the second wife of Anthony Browne, 1st Viscount Montagu. Magdalen, a Roman Catholic, was a Maid of Honour to Mary I of England and was bridesmaid at Mary's wedding to Philip II of Spain in Winchester Cathedral. Despite being Catholic, she managed to remain in high regard with Elizabeth I, the Protestant half-sister who succeeded Mary.

== Early life and Ancestry ==
Magdalen was born in January 1538 at Naworth Castle in Eskdale Ward, Cumberland, the fifth child of William Dacre, 3rd Baron Dacre of Gilsland, 2nd Baron Greystoke, and Elizabeth Talbot. The Dacres were powerful Northern Border lords and her father was a Warden of the Western March and Governor of Carlisle.

Magdalen, age 14, was sent to serve as a gentlewoman to twice-widowed Anne Sapcote, Countess of Bedford then aged about 72, who was married to her third husband John Russell, 1st Earl of Bedford.

== At the court of Mary I ==
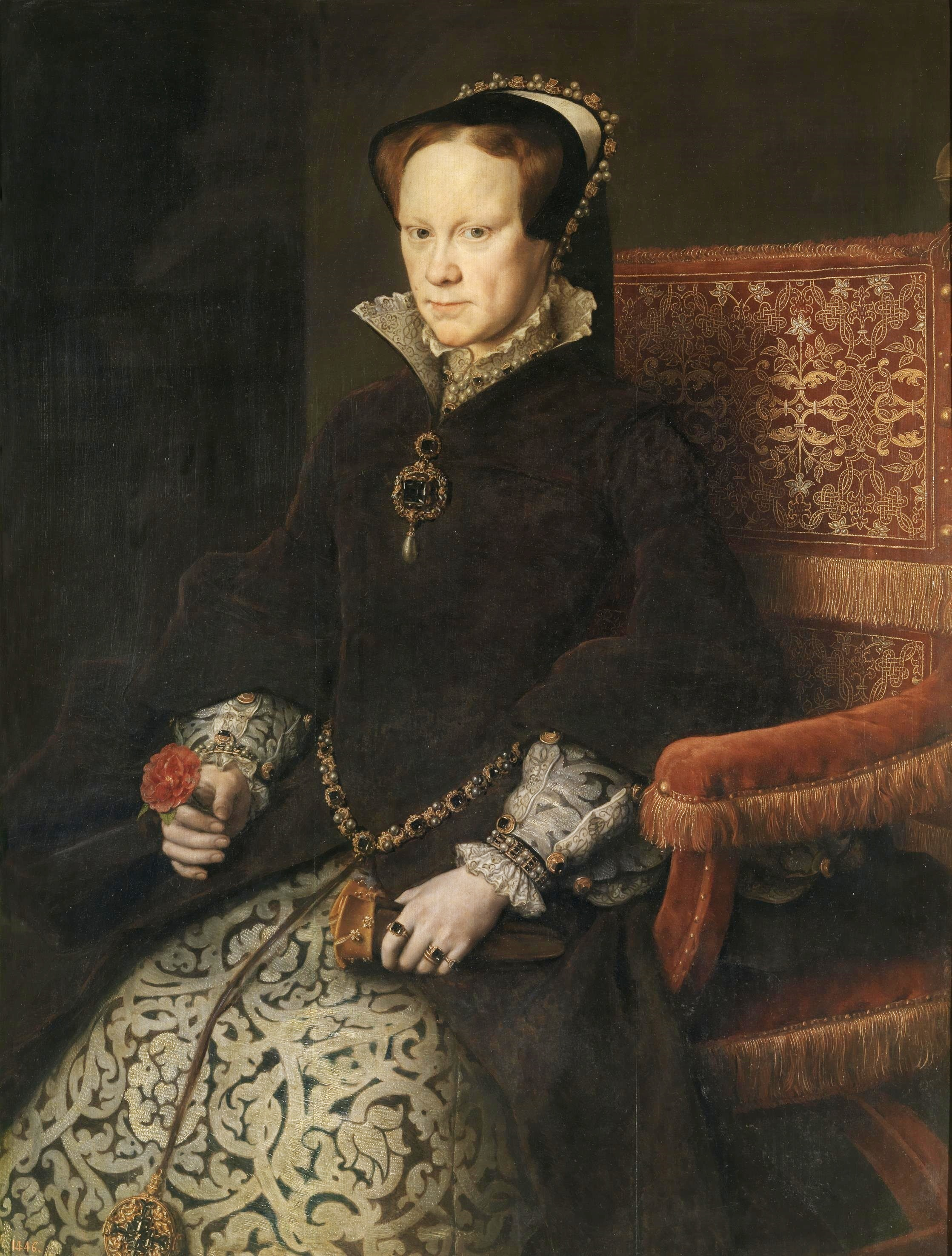
Magdalen Dacre took part in the bridal procession at the wedding of Mary I (pictured) to Philip II of Spain in 1554

In 1554, Magdalen was selected as a bridesmaid for Mary of England, who had recently accended the throne and was marrying Philip II of Spain, and took part in the bridal procession dressed in purple velvet.

As a gentlewoman at Mary's court, Magdalen was mentioned in verses by Richard Edwardes, who compared her height to the legendary Andromache:

Dacre is not dangerous, her talk is nothing coy,
Her noble stature may compare with Hector's wife of Troy.

Magdalen was described as being very attractive and blonde. She was also very tall, and reportedly stood a head above the other maids of honour at court. According to her biography by Richard Smith, she attracted the attention of Philip. The story goes that Philip opened a window to a room where Magdalen was washing her face (or possibly brushing her hair) and caught hold of her. Magdalen, mindful of the fact that women of her era had to remain virtuous and that Philip was married to Mary, was forced to beat him off with a nearby staff to escape his embrace.

== Marriage ==
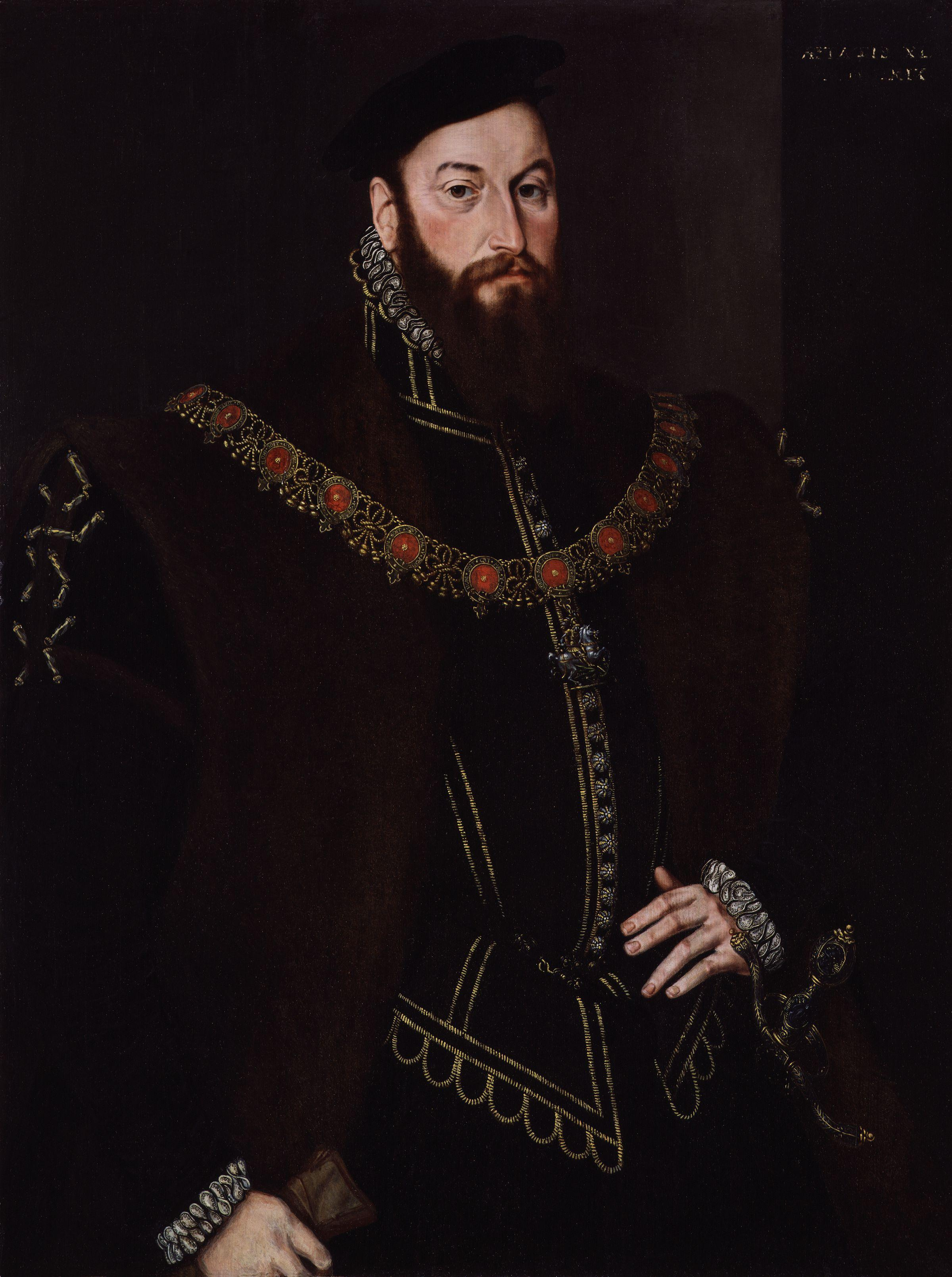
Anthony Browne, 1st Viscount Montagu, husband of Magdalen Dacre, in 1569

On 15 July 1558, Magdalen married Anthony Browne, 1st Viscount Montagu, a Privy Counsellor, Knight of the Garter and King Philip's former Master of the Horse, in a ceremony took place at St. James's Palace. Browne was 10 years Magdalen's senior, aged 30. After her accession to the throne in 1553, Browne was appointed to several positions in the royal household and, at her coronation, he carried her train. In April 1554 he was appointed Master of the Horse to Queen Mary's consort, Philip II of Spain. He met Philip on his arrival in Southampton in July 1554, a few days prior to the royal wedding at Winchester Cathedral. Due to both Anthony and Magdalen being in the royal household, Mary attended their wedding in 1558.

The couple had ten children between them (although several are assumed to have died young), but twelve in total with Anthony's two children from his first marriage. Magdalen was close to both her stepchildren, one incident was when her husband was displeased with his eldest son, Magdalen "pacified her husband", and brought her stepson into his father's favour again.

Magdalen found favour with the Queen Elizabeth despite her Catholicism, her former close friendship with the late Queen Mary, and later the behaviour of a few of her Dacre relations, some of whom conspired to depose the Queen and replace her with Mary, Queen of Scots. She was only once accused of recusancy, and although she allowed a printing press to be set up on her property, she refused to assist or abet treasonous plots against the Queen.

Magdalen died at Battle Abbey, Sussex on 8 April 1608 at the age of seventy.

=== Issue ===
- Philip Browne (born 1559).
- Sir Henry Browne (1562 – 6 February 1628). He married firstly Mary Hungate, and secondly Anne Catesby (sister of Robert Catesby who was part of the Gunpowder Plot and daughter of Sir William Catesby and Anne Throckmorton who was from the Throckmorton family, a staunchly Catholic gentry family). By Catesby he had one son – Sir Peter Browne who married Margaret Knollys of Grove Place, Hampshire. He was the ancestor of the Browne baronets of Kiddington, Oxfordshire.
- Sir George Browne, married firstly Eleanor Bridges by whom he had three daughters: Jane, Elizabeth and Frances Browne. He later married Mary Tyrwhitt with whom he had 1 son and 1 daughter – George Browne and Mary Browne.
- Sir Anthony Browne, married Anne Bell (died 5 October 1623, aged 72), daughter of Roger Bell, Esq., of Haughley in county Suffolk.
- Jane Browne, married Sir Francis Lacon of Shropshire.
- Mary Browne
- Elizabeth Browne (died after 29 September 1623), married Robert Dormer, 1st Baron Dormer of Wing by whom she had 3 sons (William, Anthony and Robert) and 3 daughters (Dorothy, Magdalen and Katherine).
- Mabel Browne who married Sir Henry Capel
- Thomas Browne
- William Browne. He is assumed to have died young and is named in the effigy on his father's tombstone.
- Anthony Browne (born 1570)
