= River Gelt =

River in Cumbria, England

Coordinates: 54°55′35″N 2°47′37″W

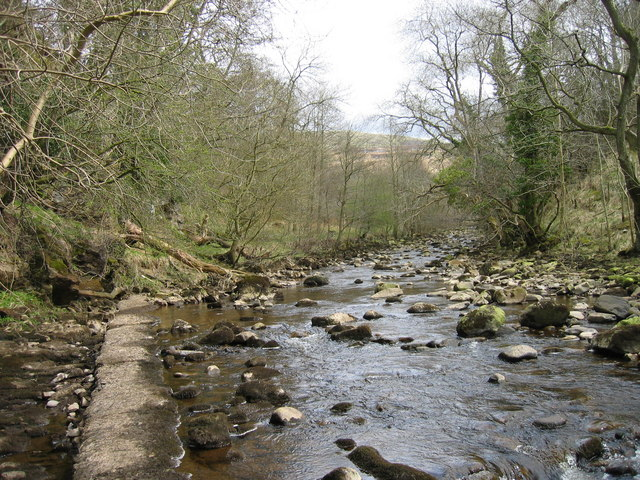
The River Gelt

The River Gelt is a river in Cumbria, England and a tributary of the River Irthing.

The source of the Gelt is close to Cumbria's border with Northumberland, where it rises (as New Water) at Butt Hill. The stream runs down Geltsdale Middle in the direction of Cumrew Fell, before turning northwards.

After a short while, New Water is joined by Old Water in the King's Forest of Geltsdale. Old Water runs from Crookburn Pike. After the two streams combine, the river continues flowing to the northwest, passing between Talkin Fell and Castle Carrock Fell, then the villages of the same names.

Having flown through Greenwell and under the Newcastle and Carlisle Railway, the Gelt continues through Gelt Woods, overlooked by a Roman inscription dating from 207 AD and known as "the written rock of Gelt". Other stories and legends are associated with Abraham's Cave. On 20 February 1570 it saw the Battle of Gelt Bridge, when Leonard Dacre and his forces were defeated by Henry Carey, 1st Baron Hunsdon.

The Gelt joins the River Irthing at Edmond Castle, about 10 miles east of Carlisle.

== Written rock of Gelt ==
The Romans quarried the soft sandstone for use in Hadrian's Wall, which lies three miles to the north. It was abandoned in 207 AD. On the rockface there was extensive carved graffiti, that has been known since the eighteenth century. It included notes, comments about the officers and a lucky symbolic penis (phallus). In 2019 the archaeology department of the University of Newcastle undertook a 3D scan of the site discovering it was more extensive than previously thought.

The task involves descending by rope or in a gantry, 30 feet (9.1 m) into the quarry and recording the rock face using structure-from-motion (SfM) photogrammetry. The site was accessible by foot before the path collapsed 30 years ago.

"These inscriptions are probably the most important on the Hadrian's Wall frontier." The inspector of ancient monuments for Hadrian's Wall at Historic England, Mike Collins, said. "They provide insight into the organisation of the vast construction project that Hadrian's Wall was, as well as some very human and personal touches, such as the caricature of their commanding officer inscribed by one group of soldiers."

== Etymology ==
There are two schools of thought as to the origin of the name Gelt. The first claims that it is of Brittonic origin and derived from *wïlt, meaning "wild, uncontrolled" (Welsh gwyllt). The same word underlies the Gelt Burn in Northumberland. However, it is unclear why this particular river should be thought of as "wild" as compared to several other waterways in the area.

The second, rather more plausible, theory is that the name is of more recent Old Norse origin. In that language, gelt means gold or money, as it does in several other Germanic languages, including Yiddish. This view is more consistent with the name Geltsdale, where the suffix dale clearly derives from the word for valley in Old Norse; see Cumbrian toponymy. It is archaeologically certain that Vikings inhabited the region, so Norse name derivations are as likely as Brittonic ones. Other place names of clearly Old Norse origin in the area include the tarns, fells, and becks, from the words for small lake, mountain and stream. In this context, the descriptor gold likely referred to the colour, not the metal, as a reference to the dark shade of the water.
