= James Leyburn =

16th-century English politician

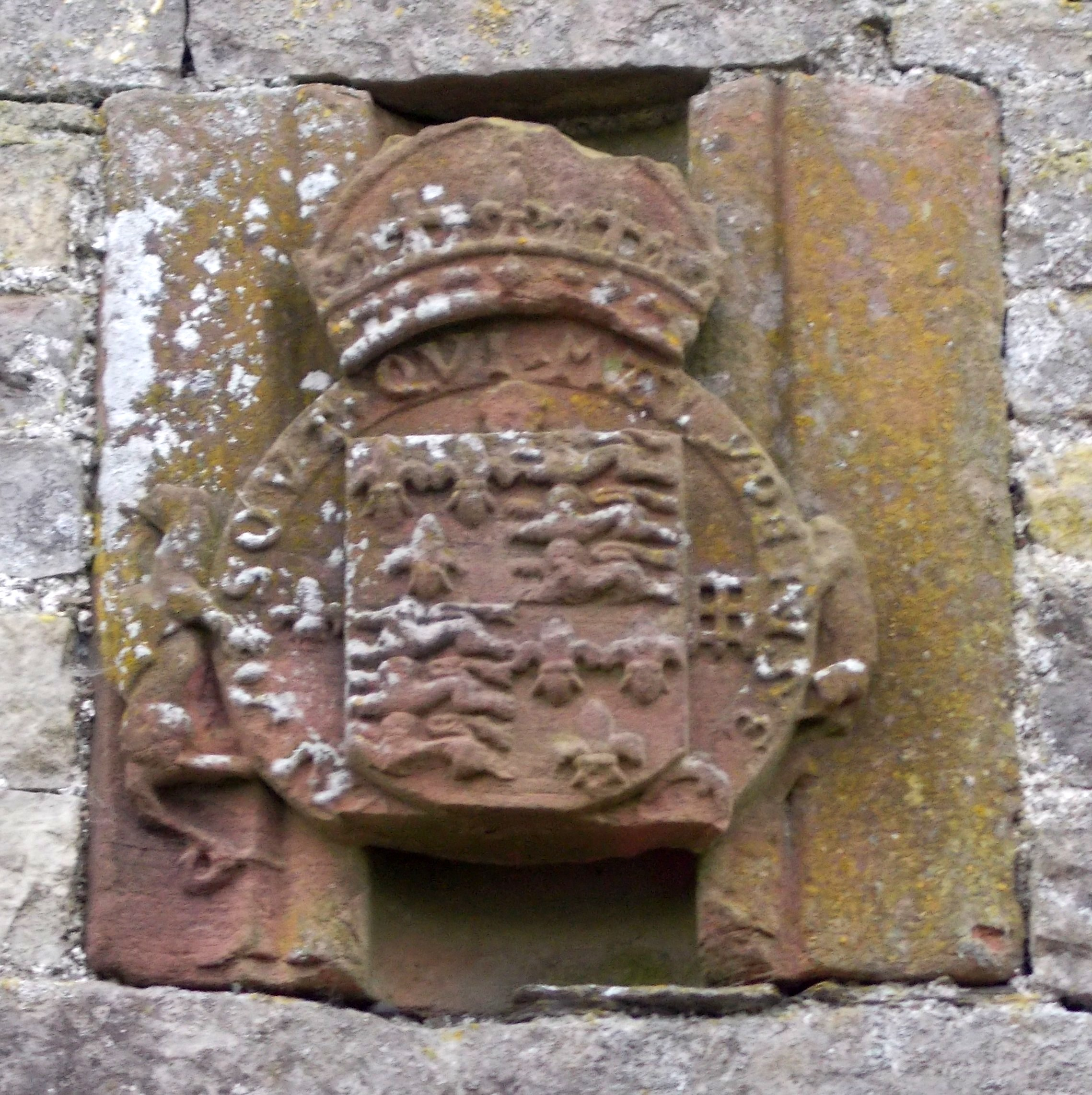
Royal arms of England (Tudor period), with garter and motto, over the arch of a gatehouse at Cunswick Hall, formerly seat of the Leyburn family

Sir James Leyburn (c. 1490 – 20 August 1548), also Laybourne, Labourn, etc., was a senior representative of one of the powerful families within the Barony of Kendal. He was at different times a Justice of the Peace for Westmorland, Escheator for Cumberland and Westmorland, and Commissioner for the survey of the monasteries of Lancashire. He was caught up in the troubles at Kendal during the Pilgrimage of Grace (1536–1537). As an assistant (and kinsman) to Sir Thomas Wharton, Deputy Warden of the West March, he took an important part in the Battle of Solway Moss (1542). He was one of the two MPs for Westmorland in 1542 and 1545.

== Leyburn of Cunswick ==
The Leyburn family of Westmorland, which derived from the family of the same name seated at Leybourne Castle in Kent, received a grant of land at Skelsmergh, a little north-east of Kendal, in or about the second quarter of the 13th century. Becoming established among the principal families of the area, in the mid-15th century the marriage of Katherine de Leyburne to Sir Henry Bellingham of Strickland Ketel (lord of the double pele tower of Burneside Hall, just to the north of Kendal) produced a daughter Katherine Bellingham.

Sir Henry Bellingham suffered attainder in c. 1461 for his adherence to the Lancastrian cause, in the victory of Edward IV, and his estates passed temporarily into the keeping of William and John Parr of Kendal. His daughter Katherine married an elder James Leyburn of Cunswick, her cousin. The Leyburn seat at Cunswick Hall, then in the parish of Kendal, was at Cunswick (Conyngeswyke, 1301), by Underbarrow, near Crosthwaite and the head of the Lyth Valley, slightly less than midway on the road passing south-west from Kendal towards the southern end of Lake Windermere at Newby Bridge. The original Hall was replaced two hundred years ago by a house of moderate scale, but some remains of an earlier gatehouse and outbuildings survive. The eldest son of James and Katherine Leyburn was Thomas Leyburn. In 1487, early in the reign of Henry VII, James made a contract for the marriage of Thomas as his son and heir to Margaret, daughter of Sir John Pennington, of Muncaster Castle, Cumberland, and widow of John Lamplugh.

== Early career ==
The eldest son and heir of Thomas and Margaret was James Leyburn, born around 1490: Thomas died in August 1510, and at his inquisition post mortem held at Kendal in the following January James, aged 21, was found to be heir to his estates. None of these were held in chief: they included the manors of Skelsmergh (held from the lords of Kendal), Bradley and Cunswick, and lands and tenements in Sleddall (from Thomas Parr). Thomas also had premises in Westminster, Holborn and London. In 1525 James had the lease of the tithes of Skelsmergh, and also those of Bradleyfield, Tranthwaite, Cunswick, Bulmerstrand and Bradeslak (which his father had occupied aforetyme), and those of Brindrigg, for 21 years, from the Abbey convent of St Mary at York. He held the office of Escheator for Cumberland and Westmorland in February 1518/19, and in February to November 1522: he was a justice of the peace for Westmorland in 1524 and 1525. He received his knighthood after 3 November 1529 in Whitehall, in the Parliament time.

James Laybourn was named one of the executors to the will of Dame Mawde Parr, widow of Sir Thomas Parr, in December 1531, and by April 1532 one James Layburn had become deputy steward of the Barony of Kendal, of which the Parrs were Stewards. At that time William Parr complained to Thomas Cromwell that the Earl of Cumberland and his associate Sir Thomas Clifford were interfering in the administration of justice in the barony of Kendal, out of hostility towards Parr and Layburn, who supported the authority there (given by royal proclamation) of the Duke of Richmond. A letter from Sir James Leyburn dated 26 April shows that Cumberland and his servants conducted the "sheriff's turn" at Kendal, contrary to the King's command given by the Duke of Norfolk in Clifford's hearing, and these disruptions and infringements of the Liberties increased through 1533. Some have taken these letters to show that Sir James Layburn and James Layburn the Deputy Steward (both "of Cunswick") were not the same person, but authorities differ.

Thomas Cromwell sent letters to Robert Poulton, Abbot of the Premonstratensian house of Cockersand, Lancashire, instructing him to grant to Sir James Leyburn certain lands belonging to the abbey in the manor of Assheton. In October 1532 the abbot was able to show that these lands had been claimed by their original tenants under a custom of tenant-right, and begged to be excused from complying. In a Star Chamber suit of 1534, Leyburn is described as being "of great power, blood and ally." Among his kin was Thomas Legh (born c. 1510), of the Cumberland family seated at Frizington, to whom he became godfather: Dr Legh gained notoriety for his work in the northern monastic closures.

== The rising at Kendal ==
Sir James Leyburn had a significant presence in the region during the years of the monastic closures and the Pilgrimage of Grace. In a letter to Cromwell of September 1535 he remarked that he thought it "no labour to serve the Duke of Richmond", adding "I would be glad to wait upon the King and you, as I was one of the first you put in the King's service." He asks for some fee or office to amend his finances. He had been at Asheton and Carnforth (Lancashire), where he and Sir Marmaduke Tunstall had committed several persons to prison for riots. He was appointed commissioner for the survey of Cartmel Priory and Conishead Priory in 1536: Sir Thomas Wharton wrote approvingly of him to Cromwell in October 1536, saying that he has been very diligent in the King's service, and lives near Kendal, "the inhabitants wherof be very troublous".

Robert Aske's rising took shape in October 1536, and on 6 December a pardon was offered to his followers. At this time the Earl of Derby wrote to the King that it was rumoured that Sir James Layburn had sworn himself to the cause of the commons, and that many said he had done so more than a month previously. On 9 February Layburn wrote to Cromwell that he had been busy trying to hold down the commons in the barony of Kendal, while struggling with an illness in which he had been strengthened by "comfortable letters" received from Cromwell and the King. He recounted the troubles in Kendal since the pardon, in which a large group of parishioners threatened to throw the curate and church elders into the river unless they proclaimed the Pope to be head of the church. The parish priest had since made such a declaration, and had continued the custom of "bidding the bedes", against the wishes of the elders.

In March 1537 Leyburn made a further deposition, that the Bailiff of Kendal, William Collins, who was sworn to the commonalty, in response to letters had raised money in the town and sent deputies to a gathering at Richmond, while the parishioners of Heversham were withholding tithes from the landlords who had taken leases from the abbot of St Mary's in York. This economic grievance underlay the account of the October 1536 rising given by Collins at his examination in London on 12 April 1537. The rebellious populations of Cumberland, Westmorland and Richmond threatened to despoil Dent, Sedburgh and Kendal unless they joined their cause, he said. Steward ("Mr.") Leyburn advised against any participation, but a sworn company from Kendal headed by Collins came repeatedly to his house for him to take their oath, as they protested against the high custumal charges introduced by the new tenant landlords. Leyburn avoided taking their oath, but his brother Nicholas applied the Steward's seal to a record of their old laudable customs.

A great force then met with the sworn men of Kendal, who explained that the gentry were not with them: whereupon the force threatened to spoil the manors. Under this duress, after some delaying, the gentlemen were sworn in with the rebels at Kendal, and so Sir James Layburn, Parson Layburn, William Lancaster, Richard Duckett, Walter Strickland and Sir Robert Bellingham mustered with them at Kelet Moor. Bellingham returned home in sickness but the force rode on Lancaster, the men of Dent and Sedburgh having chosen Atkynson to be their captain. Some deputies were sent to Doncaster. It was then following the pardon that some unruly townsmen at Kendal insisted on the bidding of the bedes, and when Collins produced the pardon they shouted "Down, carle, thou art false to the commons": Parson Layburn agreed to let the bedes be bid until the Duke of Norfolk's coming.

By 4 April the Duke informed Cromwell that Richard Duckett and (apparently) James Leyburn had apprehended John Atkynson. Cromwell noted, "In these parts men are desirous to deserve thanks and detect ill people." On 17–18 April Sir James and others took depositions from John Ayrey of Patton, from Nicholas Leyburn, James Braithwaite, Christopher Eskrigg and Robert Sleddall, most of whom mentioned Collings's role.

== New commissions ==
During the disestablishment of the great Cistercian house of Furness Abbey, Sir James Leyburn as commissioner and Sir John Lamplugh (the younger) as his assistant by the command of the Lord Lieutenant of Lancashire, gave good service, and Robert Southwell wrote to Cromwell in July 1537 asking that they be thanked and seeking their further assistance in Cumberland and Northumberland. At the appointment of Sir Thomas Wentworth as Captain of Carlisle Castle, and of Sir Thomas Wharton as Deputy Warden of the West Marches, Leyburn and Lamplugh, together with Sir William Musgrave and Sir John Lowther, Sir Richard Bellingham and some 30 others were appointed as Wharton's assistants. In December, when Cromwell and others interviewed Lamplugh, Leyburn and others as to their "demeanour", Dr Legh wrote on Leyburn's behalf, explaining that others have shown malice towards him. In March 1538 Leyburn received a commission of the peace for the Liberty of Furness.

The suppression of a seditious song against Cromwell gave Leyburn an opportunity to seek his favour in July 1538, at the same time sending news of the Council of the North. He may still have feared Cumberland's hostility in 1539, when William Parr was created Baron: at Michaelmas of that year, Sir James and Ellen his wife passed the manor or chief messuage of Cunswick, with tenements in Bradleyfield, Underbarrow and Skelsmergh, to his nephew Thomas Carus and Thomas Redmayne, by fine, perhaps to safeguard it. But in April 1540 his name appears among the annual payments for the assistants to the Deputy Warden of the West March ("foranempst Scotland") tendered to Cromwell, and before the end of that month he was included in a special commission of the peace for the Northern Circuit. Cromwell's fall was then imminent.

== MP and soldier ==
Leyburn's election as the senior Knight of the shire for Westmorland in 1542 (an election held at Appleby Castle) occurred at a time when the influence of the Earl of Cumberland was diminished by conflict with his tenants: hence a representative from the Barony of Kendal, under the aegis of William Parr, had the seat. The second member for Westmorland, the young Nicholas Bacon (of Suffolk origin), was probably Cumberland's candidate.

Sir Thomas Wharton led the comparatively small English force which defeated the much greater numbers of invading Scots at the Battle of Solway Moss in November 1542. Sir James Layburn's role in this battle was evidently important as he is mentioned in two accounts or despatches sent by Wharton to the Earl of Hertford. Sir Thomas lists four knights with him in Carlisle on 24 November, Sir William Musgrave, Sir Thomas Curwen, Sir John Lowther and Sir James Layburn: Walter Strickland and William Pennington head the list of 18 esquires and others that were with him there. In a letter of 26 November Wharton lists them again, making clear that most of his worthies were his kinsmen, adding that all had "served his majestie in suche wise that I cannot write unto your lordship the worthynes of theyre praise".

Many Scots were taken prisoner, and pledges were given for them who were kept as hostages. By July 1543 there had arisen a dispute among the gentlemen of the West Marches concerning their service in the battle, some taking all the praise to themselves to the detriment of others who should have been partners in the gain and commendation. Two gentlemen had complained to the Duke of Suffolk that the horsemen had diminished the credit of the footsoldiers (but laying no claim to any share of the booty). The Duke showed them that the King had written his thanks to them all, and his opinion would not be swayed by misreports: and Suffolk wrote to William Parr that he should send for Sir James Layburne, "who seems to speak for many", and assure him that it was so, and that the worst detractors would be punished or reproved. On the separate question of the sharing of ransoms, the principle that prisoners belonged to those who had captured them was invariable.

The sister of William Parr, Katherine Parr, became the sixth wife of King Henry VIII in 1543, and it seems likely that she may have been influential in Layburn's selection for the second time as Knight of the shire for Westmorland in 1545.

In 1547, Sir James appeared in court in York to testify (in a case brought against Alan Bellingham of Helsington), that Edward Bethom of Tranthwaite, having enfeoffed two priests with all his lands in January 1516/17 as by a covenant, six years later stole the deeds from the priest's coffer at Underbarrow. James made his will on 4 July 1548 and died on 20 August following. His Inquisition post mortem was taken on 1 May 1549 at Heppe (Shap), before Ambrose Lancaster, when he was found to have held the manor and premises of Cunswick and Tranthwaite (in socage), lands and tenements in Brathelake (a peppercorn fealty), in Skelsmergh (in socage as of the castle of Kendal by a pair of gilt spurs), in Long Sleddall (in socage as of the Barony of Kendal by a sore sparrowhawk) and in Wynstere (in socage by a pound of cumin), all held from William Parr, 1st Marquess of Northampton by these various means. His son Nicholas Laybourn, esq., aged 32, was found to be his next heir.

== Family ==
Sir James Leyburn married twice. His first wife was Eleanor, daughter of Sir Thomas Curwen of Workington, Cumberland (by whom he had two sons and two daughters). Leyburn married secondly Helen, daughter of Thomas Preston, of Preston Patrick, Westmorland, and his wife Anne Thornburgh. By this marriage Sir James had three further daughters. The second wife Dame Helen Leyburn survived and remarried to the 2nd Baron Mounteagle.

- His elder son Nicholas Leyburn (born c. 1517), who married (as her second husband) Elizabeth, daughter of John (and sister of Thomas) Warcop of Smardale by Anne, daughter of Geoffrey Lancaster. She first married a Tunstall. She had 6 children by Nicholas Leyburn, who died during the 1560s leaving a will which only partially survives. Elizabeth, who overlived him, died testate in 1567. Nicholas was father of James Leyburn, who was executed in 1583 for being "a Catholic traitor", and of William, who succeeded his brother and faced commissions of inquiry following James's attainder.
- His younger son James Leyburn, who is named an executor in Sir James's will of 1548.
- His daughter Anne married William Stanley, 3rd Baron Monteagle.
- His daughter Elizabeth married twice, (1) to Thomas, Lord Dacre, and (2) to Thomas Howard, 4th Duke of Norfolk: her three Howard stepsons married her three Dacre daughters.
- His daughter Catharine married Richard Ducket of Grayrigg.

His great-grandson was the Roman Catholic priest George Leyburn.
