= Enrolled bill rule =

Principle of judicial interpretation of rules of procedure in legislative bodies

The enrolled bill rule is a principle of judicial interpretation of rules of procedure in legislative bodies and rule of recognition. Under the doctrine, once a bill passes a legislative body and is signed into law, the courts assume that all rules of procedure in the enactment process were properly followed. That is, "[i]f a legislative document is authenticated in regular form by the appropriate officials, the court treats that document as properly adopted."

== United Kingdom ==
The doctrine was adopted in The King v Arundel. It was based on the proposition that when an Act was passed and assented to, it was affixed with the Great Seal, the "effective legal act of enactment". It was "a regal act, and no official might dispute the king's word".

The enrolled bill rule was restated by Lord Campbell in Edinburgh & Dalkeith Railway Co v Wauchope. In that case it was complained that the passage of a private bill was defective because proper notice had not been given. The House of Lords rejected the notion that the validity of an Act could be questioned.

== United States ==
In the United States, the rule was adopted by the Supreme Court in Field v. Clark, 143 U.S. 649 (1892). In effect, the court ruled that the enrolled bill signed by the presiding officers of the two houses of Congress was the best evidence of what had been passed, being on balance better evidence than the journals of the respective houses, so it should not be called into question.

=== State law ===
At the time of the decision in Field, nine states had adopted the doctrine, and thirteen had rejected it. At least two states have weakened it:

- The Supreme Court of Kentucky has held that "there is a prima facie presumption that an enrolled bill is valid but such presumption may be overcome by clear, satisfactory and convincing evidence establishing that constitutional requirements have not been met".
- The Pennsylvania Supreme Court has limited the application of the doctrine. It held, "When a law has been passed and approved and certified in due form, it is no part of the duty of the judiciary to go behind the law as duly certified to inquire into the observance of form in its passage", but the court also noted that "it would be a serious dereliction ... to deliberately ignore a clear constitutional violation".

== See also ==
- United States House Committee on Enrolled Bills
- Parliamentary sovereignty
- Bill of Rights 1689, which prohibited proceedings in parliament (such as the form of passing bills) from being questioned outside of parliament
