= Lord William Howard =

English nobleman (1563–1640)

- Born: 19 December 1563; Audley End, Essex
- Died: 7 October 1640 (aged 76); Greystoke, Cumbria
- Education: University of Cambridge
- Spouse: Elizabeth Dacre (after 1577)
- Parent(s): Thomas Howard, 4th Duke of Norfolk; Margaret Audley
- Relatives: Thomas Howard, 1st Earl of Suffolk (brother); Philip Howard, 20th Earl of Arundel (half-brother); Thomas Audley, 1st Baron Audley (grandfather); Henry Howard, Earl of Surrey (grandfather)

Lord William Howard (19 December 1563 – 7 October 1640) was an English nobleman and antiquary, sometimes known as "Belted Will" or "Bauld (bold) Will".

== Early life ==
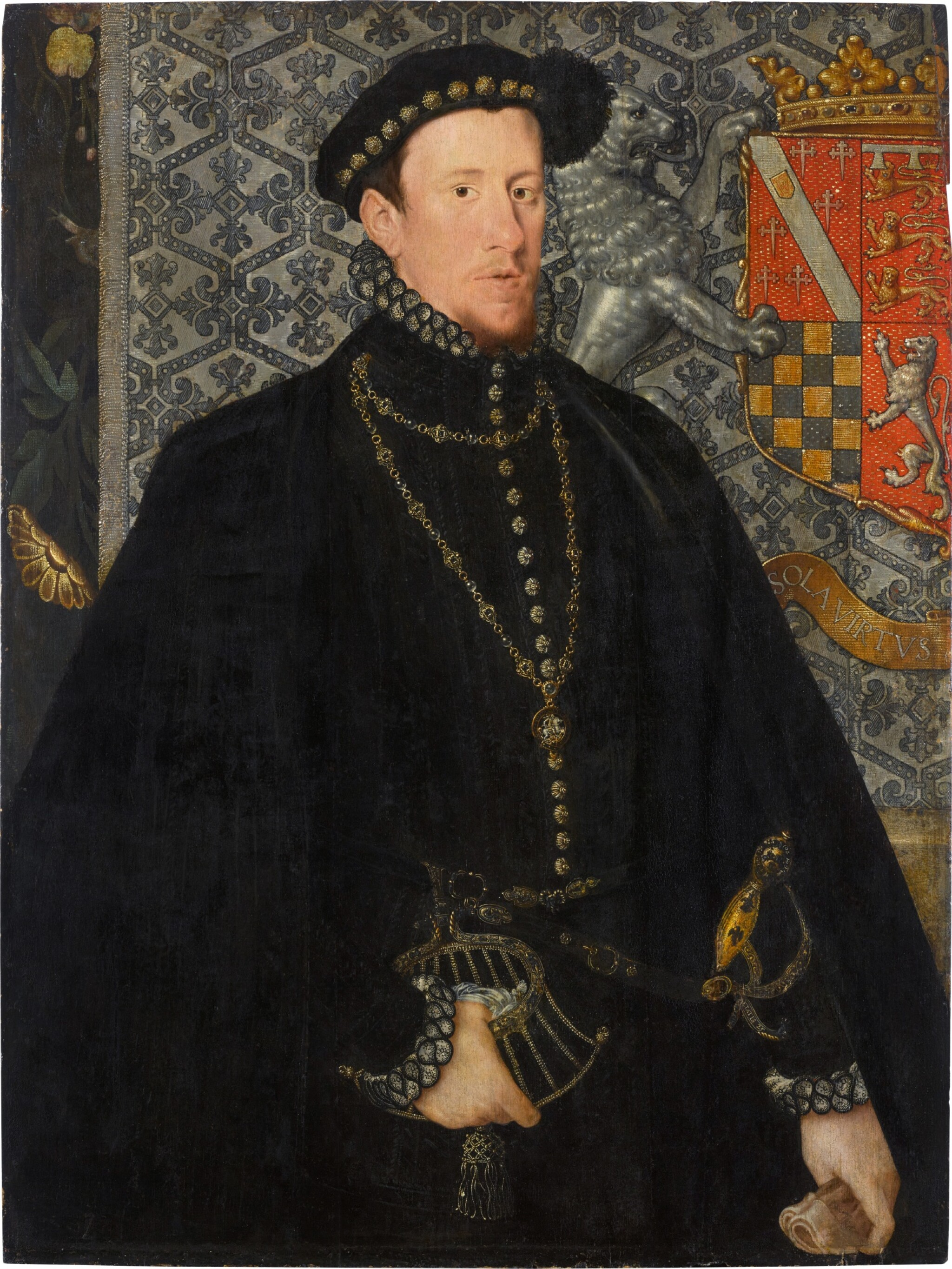
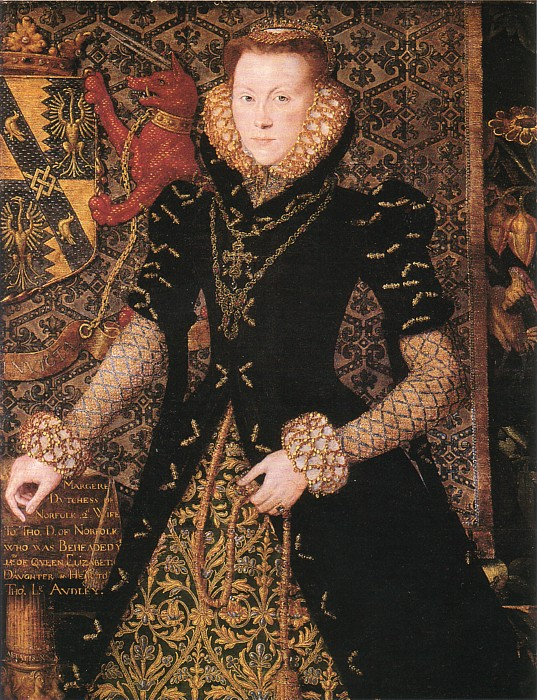
Thomas Howard, 4th Duke of Norfolk and Margaret Audley, William's parents

Howard was born on 19 December 1563 at Audley End, Essex, the fourth and last child of Thomas Howard, 4th Duke of Norfolk by his second wife, Margaret Audley. His older siblings were Elizabeth, who died as a child, Thomas and Margaret. His maternal grandparents were Thomas Audley, Baron Audley of Walden and his second wife Elizabeth Grey. His paternal grandparents were Henry Howard, Earl of Surrey and his wife Frances de Vere. On his father's side, William had an older half-brother, Philip Howard, who was also William's second cousin (because Philip's mother, Mary FitzAlan, and Margaret Audley were first cousins). After his mother's death in January 1564, William's father married, thirdly, Elizabeth (née Leyburne) Dacre (widow of Thomas Dacre, 4th Baron Dacre and the eldest daughter of James Leyburne of Cunswick).

Howard's father, a Roman Catholic with a Protestant education, was arrested in 1569 for his involvement in intrigues against Queen Elizabeth I, primarily due to the Duke's intention to marry Mary I Stewart, Queen of Scots. Although the Duke was released in August 1570 after no evidence could be found against him, he soon became involved in the Ridolfi Plot to overthrow Elizabeth, release to Mary and install her on the English throne, and, after marrying her and becoming king consort, restore Catholicism to England. He was arrested again in September 1571 when his involvement in the conspiracy was discovered. Norfolk was tried for high treason and sentenced to death in January 1572; he was executed in June of that year, when William was eight years old. After his father's death, William and his siblings Philip, Thomas, and Margaret were left in the care of their uncle, Henry Howard, who also took charge of their education. William and his siblings lived with their uncle at Audley End during this time. Due to his father's execution, much of his paternal family's property was forfeited. However, William and his siblings and their older half-brother Philip recovered some of the forfeited estates.

Howard's paternal grandparents were Henry Howard, styled Earl of Surrey (the eldest son of Thomas Howard, Duke of Norfolk) and Frances de Vere (third daughter of John de Vere, Earl of Oxford and, his second wife, Elizabeth Trussell, daughter and heiress of John Trussell). After his grandfather's execution in 1547, his grandmother married Thomas Staynings of East Soham. His mother, the widow of Henry Dudley (the youngest son of John Dudley, Duke of Northumberland), was the daughter of Thomas Audley, Baron Audley of Walden and, his second wife, Elizabeth Grey (third daughter of Thomas Grey, Marquess of Dorset).

== Career ==
After Howard's marriage in 1577, he went up to the University of Cambridge. Howard was a learned and accomplished scholar, praised by William Camden, to whom he sent inscriptions and drawings from relics collected by him from the Roman wall, as "a singular lover of valuable antiquity and learned withal." Walter Scott referred to him as "Belted Will" in the Lay of the Last Minstrel.

Being suspected of treasonable intentions together with his half-brother, Philip, Earl of Arundel (husband of his sister-in-law Anne Dacre), Howard was imprisoned in 1583, 1585, and 1589. He joined the Church of Rome in 1584, both brothers being dispossessed by the queen of a portion of their Dacre estates, which were, however, restored in 1601 for a payment of £10,000.

Howard then took up residence with his children and grandchildren at Naworth Castle in Cumberland, restored the castle, improved the estate, and established order in that part of the country. He collected a valuable library, of which most of the printed works remain at Naworth, though the manuscripts have been dispersed, a portion being now among the Arundel manuscripts in the College of Arms; he corresponded with James Ussher and was intimate with Camden, Henry Spelman, and Robert Cotton, whose eldest son married his daughter. In 1592, he published an edition of Florence of Worcester's Chronicon ex Chronicis, dedicated to William Cecil, Baron Burghley, and drew up a genealogy of his family.

In 1603, on the accession of James I to the English throne, Howard was restored in blood. In 1618 he was made one of the commissioners for the Scotland/England border, and performed services in upholding the law and suppressing marauders.

== Personal life ==
On 28 October 1577, Howard married his step-sister Elizabeth Dacre, third daughter of Thomas Dacre, 4th Baron Dacre and the former Elizabeth Leyburne. She was also the sister and co-heiress of George Dacre, 5th Baron Dacre. After Elizabeth's father died, her mother married his father in 1566. Together, Elizabeth and William were the parents of:

- Philip Howard (b. 1581), who married Margaret Carryl (c. 1583–c. 1614), daughter of John Carryl of Harting.
- Francis Howard (1588–1660) of Corby Castle who married Margaret Preston, daughter of John Preston of Furness. After she died in 1625, he married Mary Widdrington, a daughter of Henry Widdrington.
- William Howard
- Charles Howard
- Thomas Howard, who married Elizabeth Eure, eldest daughter of William Eure, MP for Scarborough (third son of William Eure, Baron Eure), and Catherine Bowes, de jure suo jure Baroness Scrope of Bolton (only child of William Bowes of Streatlam Castle and, his first wife, Mary Scrope, only child by his first wife of Henry Scrope, 9th Baron Scrope of Bolton).
- Margaret Howard (c. 1580–c. 1621), who married Thomas Cotton, second Baronet of Conington, in 1617.
- Mary Howard, who married John Wintour.
- Elizabeth Howard, who married, as his first wife, Henry Bedingfeld of Oxburgh Hall, son and heir of Thomas Bedingfeld and Frances Jerningham (daughter and co-heiress of John Jerningham, of Somerleyton).

Howard died on 7 October 1640 at Greystoke, to which place he had been removed when failing in health, to escape the Scots who were threatening an advance on Naworth. His eldest son Philip was the grandfather of Charles, Earl of Carlisle, and his second son Francis was the ancestor of the Howards of Corby.

=== Legacy ===
William Howard School, the secondary school in Brampton, Cumbria, is named after Howard.
