= George Dacre, 5th Baron Dacre =

George Dacre, 5th Baron Dacre of Gilsland, 9th Baron Greystoke (c. 1561 – 17 May 1569) was an English peer and landowner in the county of Cumberland. He was summoned to parliament at about the age of five.

== Life ==
Born around 1561, he was the only surviving son of Thomas Dacre, 4th Baron Dacre (c. 1527 – 1566), by his marriage to Elizabeth Leyburne (1536–1567), the eldest daughter of Sir James Leyburne of Westmorland. This was his father's second marriage. He had a brother, Francis, who died in infancy, and three sisters – Anne (21 March 1557 – 19 April 1630), Mary (4 July 1563 – 7 April 1578), and Elizabeth (born 12 December 1564)

He succeeded his father as Baron Dacre and Baron Greystoke on 1 July 1566, at the age of five. Soon after this, his widowed mother married Thomas Howard, 4th Duke of Norfolk, but she died in childbirth on 4 September 1567, thus Dacre and his three sisters were left as members of the household of their widowed step-father, Norfolk.

The boy peer, aged no more than five, was summoned to parliament on 30 September 1566. After he died on 17 May 1569, his two baronies, although claimed by his uncle Leonard, were found to have fallen into abeyance, leaving Dacre's three sisters as co-heiresses. By the age of fourteen, each of the three had been married to one of their stepbrothers, the sons of the Duke of Norfolk.

== Notes ==
Peerage of England
Preceded by Thomas Dacre	Baron Dacre; Baron Greystoke; 1566–1569	Abeyant
