= William Dacre, 3rd Baron Dacre =

English peer, landowner and office holder (c. 1493–1563)

William Dacre, 7th Baron Greystock, later 3rd Baron Dacre of Gilsland (c. 1493 – 18 November 1563) was an English peer, a Cumberland landowner, and the holder of important offices under the Crown, including many years' service as Warden of the West Marches.

== Life ==
The son of Thomas Dacre, 2nd Baron Dacre, by his marriage to Elizabeth Greystoke, Dacre succeeded his mother as Baron Greystock on 14 August 1516 and his father as Baron Dacre in 1525. From his father, he inherited about 70,000 acres (280 km^{2}) of land in Cumberland, 30,000 acres (120 km^{2}) in Yorkshire and 20,000 acres (81 km^{2}) in Northumberland.

On an unknown date between 18 May 1519 and 1527, he married Lady Elizabeth Talbot, the fifth daughter of George Talbot, 4th Earl of Shrewsbury, by his marriage to Anne Hastings, only daughter of William Hastings, 1st Baron Hastings. She was still alive on 6 May 1552.

Dacre was Captain of Norham Castle in 1522–23. Between 1523 and 1525, during the Scottish war, he was accused of stirring up border unrest and was later brought before the Star Chamber, where he lost his wardenries. Steward of Penrith, Warden of the West Marches from 1527 to 1534 and again from 1549 until his death in 1563, Governor of Carlisle 1549 to 1551 and Warden of the Middle Marches from 1553 until 1555. In 1534 he was accused of treason, being accused of holding unauthorised cross-border negotiations with the Scots, and was committed to the Tower on about 15 May 1534. He was tried in Westminster Hall and acquitted on 9 July 1534, to cheers, after defending himself in court for seven hours. However, he was fined heavily.

In June 1528 he wrote from London to Cardinal Wolsey mentioning that he had been on a pilgrimage to Canterbury and had fallen from his horse, breaking his left arm, "overthwart a cart-spirn".

On his death in 1563, he was succeeded by his eldest son Thomas Dacre, 4th Baron Dacre. William was buried at Carlisle Cathedral.

Children of William Dacre and Elizabeth Talbot:

- Anne Dacre (c. 1538 – died c. July 1581) married Henry Clifford, 2nd Earl of Cumberland
- Dorothy Dacre
- Thomas Dacre, 4th Baron Dacre (c. 1526 – 1566)
- Leonard Dacre (c. 1527 – 12 August 1573)
- Edward Dacre (c. 1528 – 1584)
- Francis Dacre (c. 1529 – 19 February 1633)
- Magdalen Dacre (1538 – c. 1608)

== Notes ==
Peerage of England
Preceded by Thomas Dacre	Baron Dacre; 1525–1563	Succeeded by Thomas Dacre
Preceded by Elizabeth de Greystoke	Baron Greystoke; 1516–1563	Succeeded by Thomas Dacre
