= Anne Boleyn =

Queen of England from 1533 to 1536

- Marchioness of Pembroke
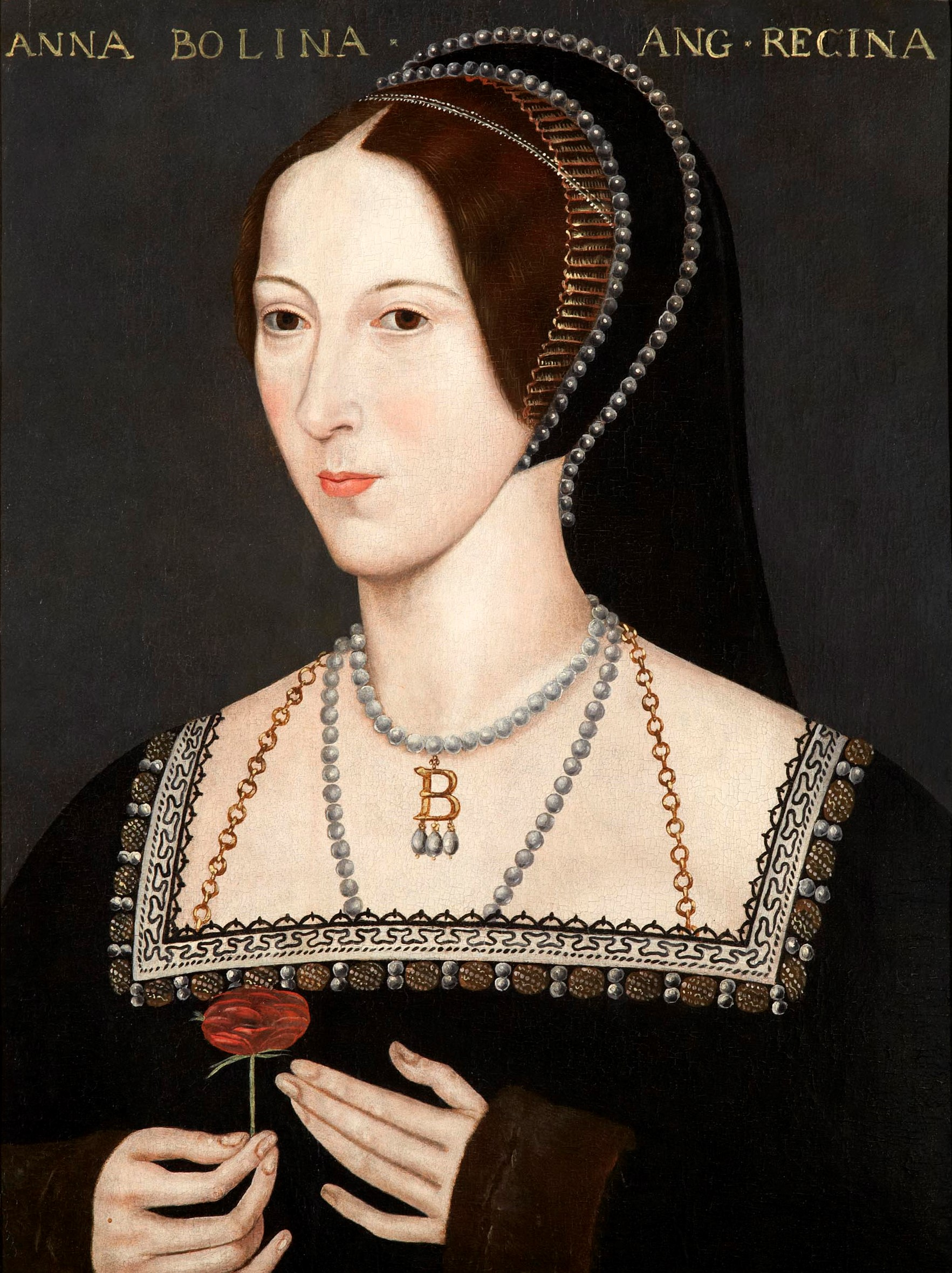
- Posthumous portrait of Anne Boleyn at Hever Castle, c. 1583

Queen consort of England
- Tenure: 28 May 1533 – 17 May 1536
- Coronation: 1 June 1533
- Born: c. 1501 or 1507; Blickling Hall, Norfolk, England
- Died: 19 May 1536 (aged 28–35); Tower of London, London, England
- Cause of death: Execution by beheading
- Burial: 19 May 1536; Church of St Peter ad Vincula, Tower of London, London
- Spouse: Henry VIII (m. 1532/1533; (Note: Henry and Anne married in secret in late 1532, which was followed by second wedding in January 1533.) ann. 1536 (Note: Anne Boleyn's marriage to Henry VIII was annulled on 17 May 1536, two days before her execution.))
- Issue: Elizabeth I
- Family: Boleyn
- Father: Thomas Boleyn, 1st Earl of Wiltshire
- Mother: Elizabeth Howard

Anne Boleyn (/ˈbʊlɪn, bʊˈlɪn/; (Note: Also signing herself as Anne Rochford while her father and brother were Viscount Rochford, respectively.) c. 1501 or 1507 – 19 May 1536) was Queen of England from 1533 to 1536, as the second wife of King Henry VIII. The circumstances of her marriage and execution, by beheading for treason, made her a key figure in the political and religious upheaval that marked the start of the English Reformation.

Anne was the daughter of Thomas Boleyn (later Earl of Wiltshire), and his wife, Elizabeth Howard. She was educated in the Netherlands and France. Anne returned to England in early 1522, to marry her cousin James Butler, 9th Earl of Ormond; the marriage plans were broken off, and instead, she secured a post at court as maid of honour to Henry VIII's wife, Catherine of Aragon. Early in 1523, Anne was secretly betrothed to Henry Percy, son of Henry Percy, 5th Earl of Northumberland, but the betrothal was broken off when the Earl refused to support it. Cardinal Thomas Wolsey refused the match in January 1524.

In February or March 1526, Henry VIII began his pursuit of Anne. She resisted his attempts to seduce her, refusing to become his mistress, as her sister Mary had previously been. Henry focused on annulling his marriage to Catherine, so he would be free to marry Anne. After Wolsey failed to obtain an annulment from Pope Clement VII, it became clear the marriage would not be annulled by the Catholic Church. As a result, Henry and his advisers, such as Thomas Cromwell, began breaking the Church's power in England and closing the monasteries. Henry and Anne formally married on 25 January 1533, after a secret wedding on 14 November 1532. On 23 May 1533, the newly appointed Archbishop of Canterbury Thomas Cranmer declared Henry and Catherine's marriage null and void. Five days later, he declared Henry and Anne's marriage valid. Pope Clement excommunicated Henry and Cranmer. As a result of the marriage and excommunications, the first break between the Church of England and the Catholic Church took place, and the King took control of the Church of England. Anne was crowned queen on 1 June 1533. On 7 September, she gave birth to the future Queen Elizabeth I. Henry was disappointed to have a daughter, but hoped a son would follow and professed to love Elizabeth. Anne subsequently had three miscarriages and by March 1536, Henry was courting Jane Seymour.

Henry had Anne investigated for high treason in April 1536. On 2 May 1536, she was arrested and sent to the Tower of London, where she was put on trial before a jury, including Henry Percy, her former betrothed, and her uncle Thomas Howard, 3rd Duke of Norfolk. She was convicted on 15 May 1536 and beheaded four days later. Most historians dispute the charges, which included adultery, incest with her brother George, and plotting to kill the King.

After her daughter, Elizabeth, became queen in 1558, Anne became venerated as a martyr and heroine of the English Reformation, particularly through the works of George Wyatt. She has inspired, or been mentioned in, many cultural works and retained her hold on the popular imagination. She has been called "the most influential and important queen consort England has ever had", as she provided the occasion for Henry to declare the English Church's independence from the Vatican.

== Early years ==
Anne was the daughter of Thomas Boleyn, later Earl of Wiltshire and Earl of Ormond, and his wife, Elizabeth Howard, who was the eldest daughter of Thomas Howard, then Earl of Surrey and future 2nd Duke of Norfolk, and his first wife Elizabeth Tilney. Anne's date of birth is unknown.

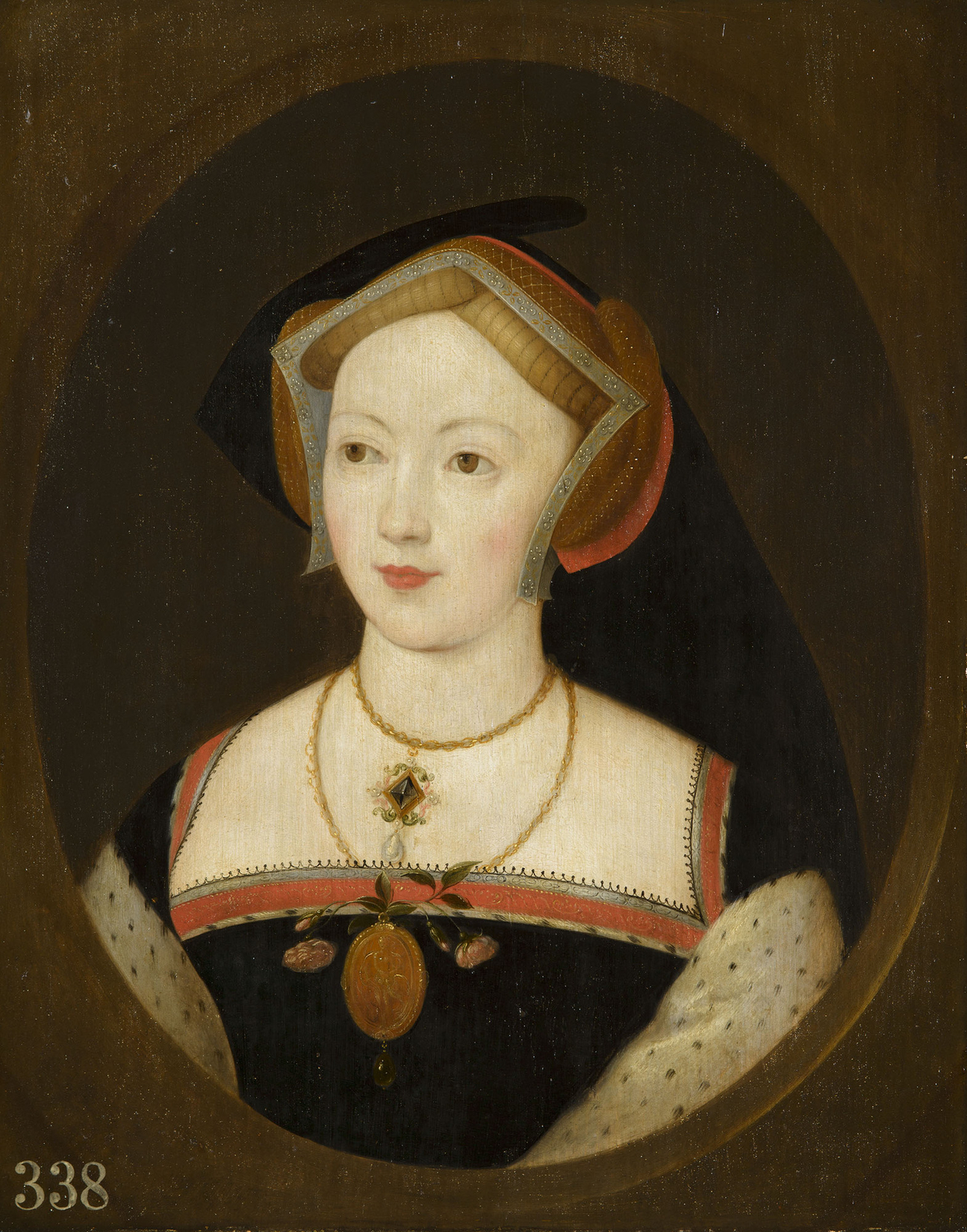
Portrait of Anne's elder sister Mary Boleyn, by Remigius van Leemput, c. 1630–1670

The academic debate about Anne's birth date focuses on two key dates: c. 1501 and c. 1507. Eric Ives, a British historian and biographer, advocates 1501, while Retha Warnicke, an American scholar who has also written a biography of Anne, prefers 1507. The key piece of surviving written evidence is a letter Anne wrote sometime in 1514. She wrote it in French to her father, who was still living in England while Anne was completing her education at Mechelen in the Habsburg Netherlands, the regency court of Margaret of Austria. Ives argues that the style of the letter and its mature handwriting prove that Anne must have been about 13 at the time of its composition, while Warnicke argues that the numerous misspellings and grammatical errors show that the letter was written by a child. In Ives's view, this would also be around the minimum age that a girl could be a maid of honour, as Anne was to the regent. This is supported by a chronicler from the late 16th century, who wrote that Anne was twenty when she returned from France. These findings are contested by Warnicke in several books and articles, and the evidence does not conclusively support either date.

An independent contemporary source supports the 1507 date: William Camden wrote a history of the reign of Elizabeth I and was granted access to the private papers of Lord Burghley and to the state archives. In that history, in the chapter dealing with Elizabeth's early life, he records that Anne was born in 1507. Historian Amy Licence notes that this could be a misreading, as surviving examples of Burghley's handwriting show that he would use a long lead-in stroke for the number "1", so that it could be mistaken for a "7".

As with Anne, it is uncertain when her two siblings were born, but the evidence indicates that her sister Mary was older than Anne. Mary's children believed their mother was the elder sister, and her grandson claimed the Ormond title in 1596 on the basis that she was the elder daughter, which Elizabeth I accepted. Anne's brother George was born around 1504, and Thomas Boleyn, writing in the 1530s, stated that his children were born before the death of his father, William Boleyn, in 1505. Anne's paternal ancestor, Geoffrey Boleyn, had been a mercer and wool merchant before becoming Lord Mayor. The Boleyn family originally came from Blickling in Norfolk, 15 miles (24 km) north of Norwich. Anne's relatives included the Howards, one of the preeminent families in England; and Anne's ancestors included King Edward I of England. According to Eric Ives, she was certainly of more noble birth than Jane Seymour and Catherine Parr, Henry VIII's other English wives. The spelling of the Boleyn name was variable, as common at the time. Sometimes it was written as Bullen, hence the bull's heads which formed part of her family arms.

At the court of Margaret of Austria in the Netherlands, Anne is listed under the name Boullan. From there she signed the letter to her father as Anna de Boullan. She was also called "Anna Bolina"; this Latinised form is used in most portraits of her.

Anne's early education was typical for women of her class. In 1513, she was invited to join the schoolroom of Margaret of Austria and her four wards. During her stay, Anne was called "bright and pleasant" for her age, and it was noted by many historians that her handwriting was more impressive than her French at the time. Her academic education was limited to arithmetic, her family genealogy, grammar, history, reading, spelling and writing. She also developed domestic skills such as dancing, embroidery, good manners, household management, music, needlework and singing. Anne learned to play games, such as cards, chess and dice. She was also taught archery, falconry, horseback riding and hunting.

=== The Netherlands and France ===
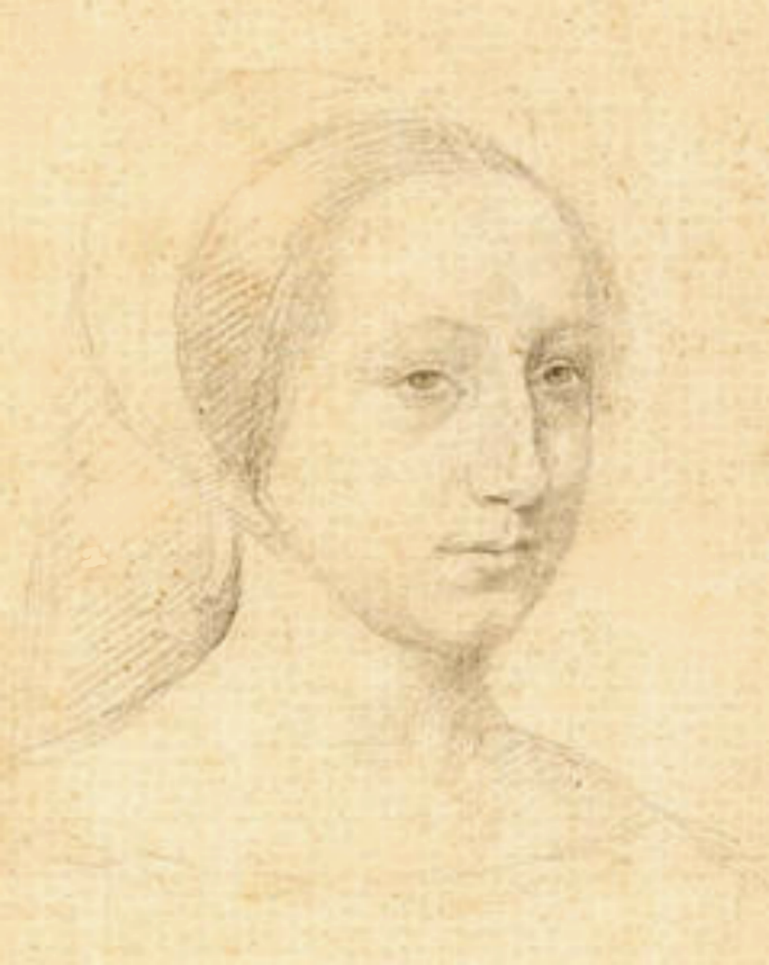
Drawing of Claude of France by Jean Clouet, c. 1520. The wife of Francis I of France, she was served by Anne as maid of honour for nearly seven years.

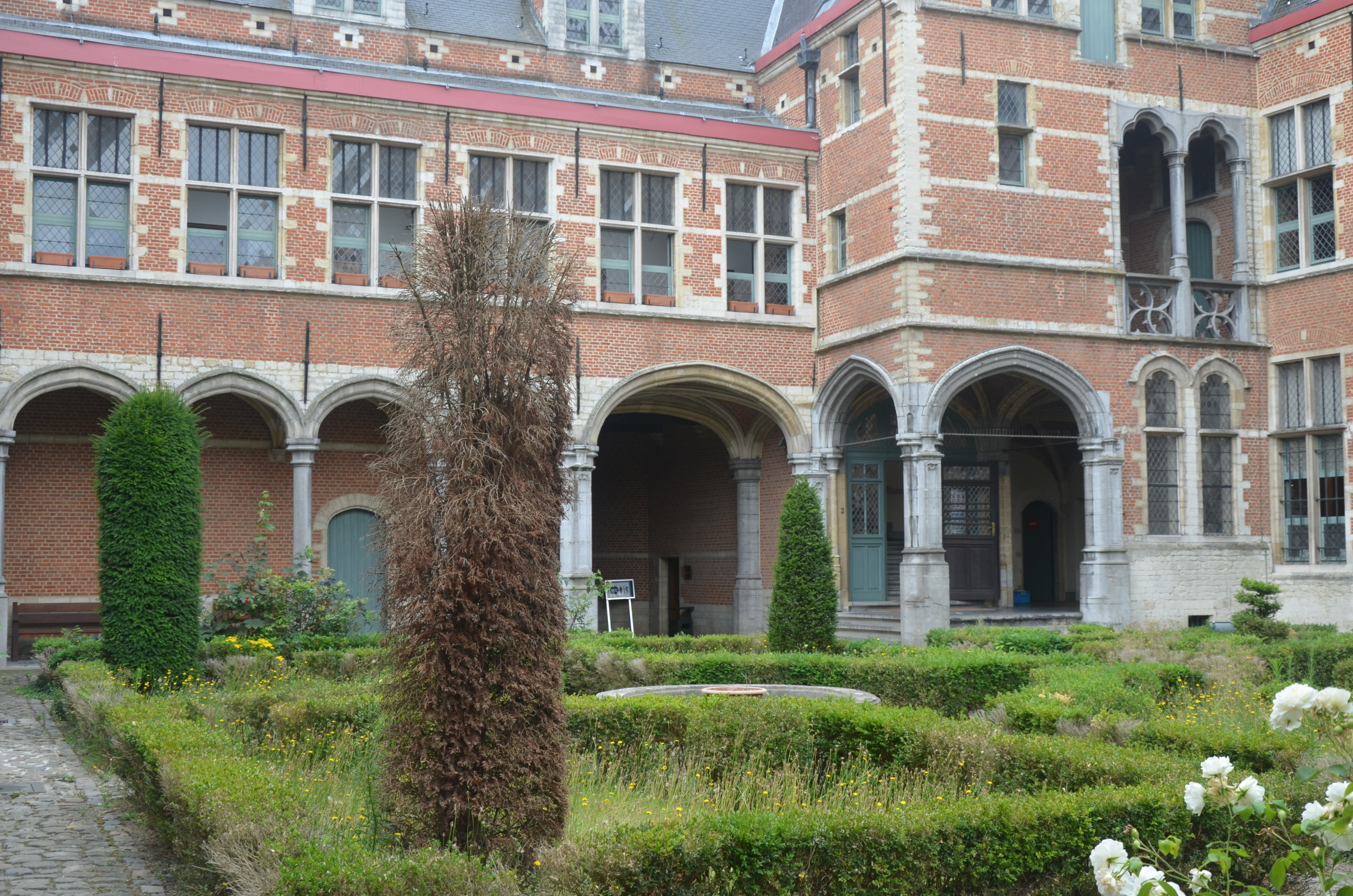
Interior Court of Savoy, Mechelen

Anne's father, Thomas, continued his diplomatic career under Henry VIII. In Europe, his charm won many admirers, including Margaret of Austria, daughter of Maximilian I, Holy Roman Emperor. During this period, Margaret ruled the Netherlands on her nephew Charles's behalf and was so impressed with Thomas Boleyn that she offered his daughter Anne a place in her household. Ordinarily, a girl had to be 12 years old to have such an honour, but Anne may have been younger, as Margaret affectionately called her la petite Boulin [sic]. Anne made a good impression in the Netherlands with her manners and studiousness; Margaret reported that she was well spoken and pleasant for her young age, and told Thomas that his daughter was "so presentable and so pleasant, considering her youthful age, that I am more beholden to you for sending her to me, than you to me". Anne stayed at the Court of Savoy in Mechelen from spring 1513 until her father arranged for her to attend Henry VIII's sister Mary, who was about to marry Louis XII of France in October 1514.

In France, Anne was a maid of honour to Queen Mary, and then to Mary's 15-year-old stepdaughter Queen Claude, with whom she stayed for nearly seven years. In the Queen's household, she completed her study of French and developed interests in art, fashion, illuminated manuscripts, literature, music, poetry and religious philosophy. Ives asserts that she "owed her evangelicalism to France", studying "reformist books", and Jacques Lefevre's translations into French of the Bible and the Pauline epistles. She also acquired knowledge of French culture, dance, etiquette, literature, music and poetry; and gained experience in flirtation and courtly love. Though all knowledge of Anne's experiences in the French court is conjecture, even Ives suggests that she was likely to have made the acquaintance of King Francis I's sister, Marguerite de Navarre, a patron of humanists and reformers. Marguerite de Navarre was also an author in her own right, and her works include elements of Christian mysticism and reform that verged on heresy, though she was protected by her status as the French king's beloved sister. She or her circle may have encouraged Anne's interest in religious reform, as well as in poetry and literature. Anne's education in France proved itself in later years, inspiring many new trends among the ladies and courtiers of England. It may have been instrumental in pressing their King toward England's break with the Papacy. William Forrest, author of a contemporary poem about Catherine of Aragon, complimented Anne's "passing excellent" skill as a dancer. "Here", he wrote, "was [a] fresh young damsel, that could trip and go."

== At the court of Henry VIII: 1522–1533 ==
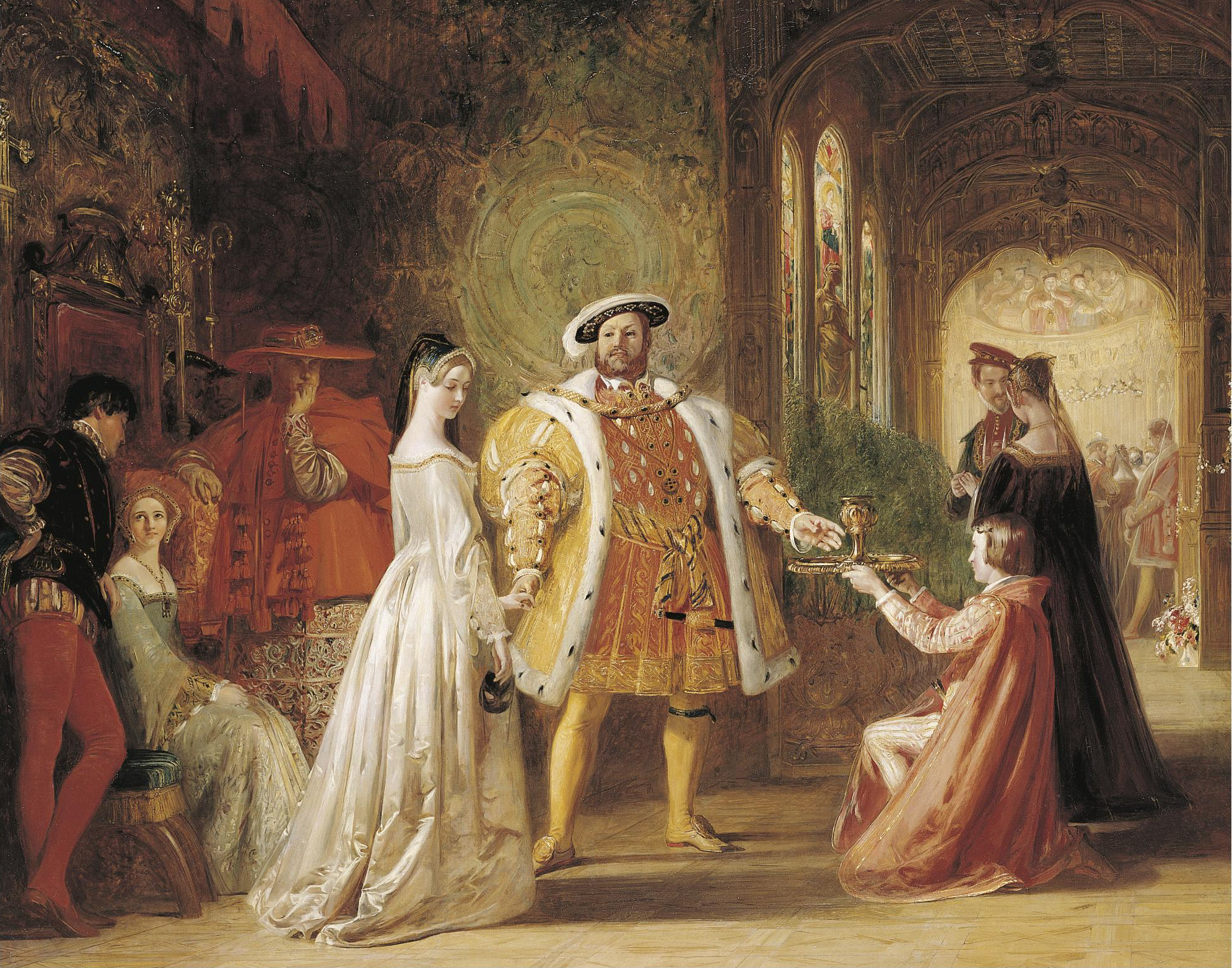
Henry VIII’s first interview with Anne Boleyn, a 19th-century depiction by Daniel Maclise (1836)

Anne was recalled to marry her Irish cousin, James Butler, who was living at the English court. The marriage was intended to settle a dispute over the title and estates of the Earldom of Ormond. Thomas Butler, 7th Earl of Ormond died in 1515, leaving his daughters, Margaret Boleyn and Anne St Leger, as co-heiresses. In Ireland, the great-great-grandson of the third earl, Sir Piers Butler, contested the will and claimed the earldom himself. He was already in possession of Kilkenny Castle, the earls' ancestral seat. Sir Thomas Boleyn, being the son of the eldest daughter, believed the title properly belonged to him and protested to his brother-in-law, the Duke of Norfolk, who spoke to the King about the matter. Henry, fearful the dispute could ignite civil war in Ireland, sought to resolve the matter by arranging an alliance between Piers's son James and Anne Boleyn. She would bring her Ormond inheritance as dowry and thus end the dispute. The plan ended in failure, perhaps because Sir Thomas hoped for a grander marriage for his daughter or because he himself coveted the titles. Whatever the reason, the marriage negotiations came to a complete halt. James Butler later married Lady Joan Fitzgerald, daughter and heiress of James FitzGerald, 10th Earl of Desmond and Amy O'Brien.

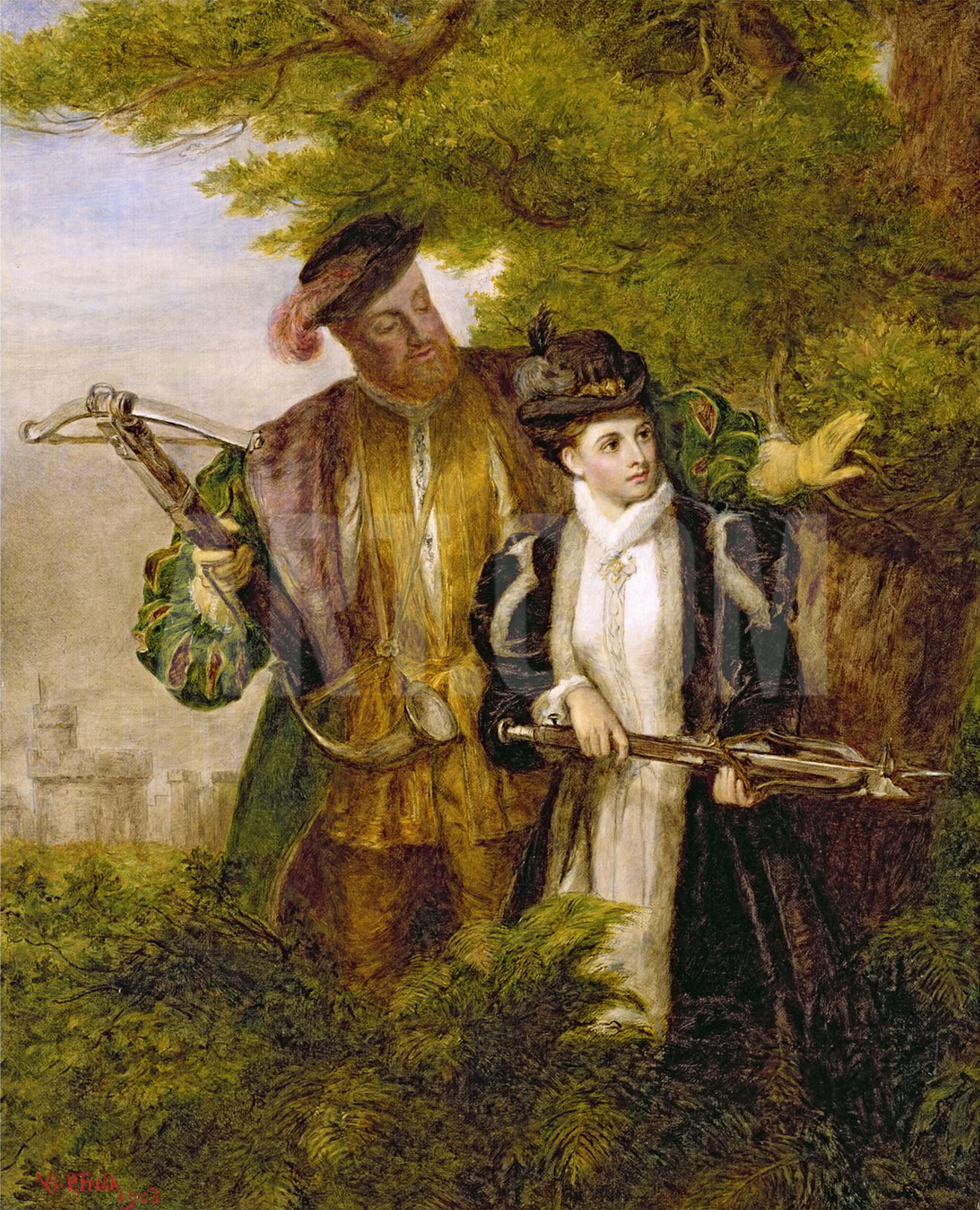
King Henry and Anne Boleyn Deer shooting in Windsor Forest by William Powell Frith, 1903

Mary Boleyn, Anne Boleyn's older sister, had been recalled from France in late 1519, ostensibly to end her affairs with the French king and his courtiers. She married William Carey, a minor noble, in February 1520, at Greenwich, with Henry VIII in attendance. Soon after, Mary became the English king's mistress. Historians dispute Henry VIII's paternity of one or both of Mary Boleyn's children born during this marriage. Henry VIII: The King and His Court, by Alison Weir, questions the paternity of Henry Carey; G. W. Bernard (The King's Reformation) and Joanna Denny (Anne Boleyn: A New Life of England's Tragic Queen) argue that Henry VIII was their father. Henry did not acknowledge either child, but he did recognise his illegitimate son Henry Fitzroy, by Elizabeth Blount, Lady Talboys.

As the daughter of courtier Thomas Boleyn, by New Year 1522 Anne had gained a position at the royal court, as lady-in-waiting to Queen Catherine. Her public début at a court event was at the Château Vert (Green Castle) pageant in honour of the Imperial ambassadors on 4 March 1522, playing "Perseverance" (one of the dancers in the spectacle, third in precedence behind Henry's sister Mary, and Gertrude Courtenay, Marchioness of Exeter). All wore gowns of white satin embroidered with gold thread. She quickly established herself as one of the most stylish and accomplished women at the court, and soon a number of young men were competing for her.

Six wives of Henry VIII
and years of marriage

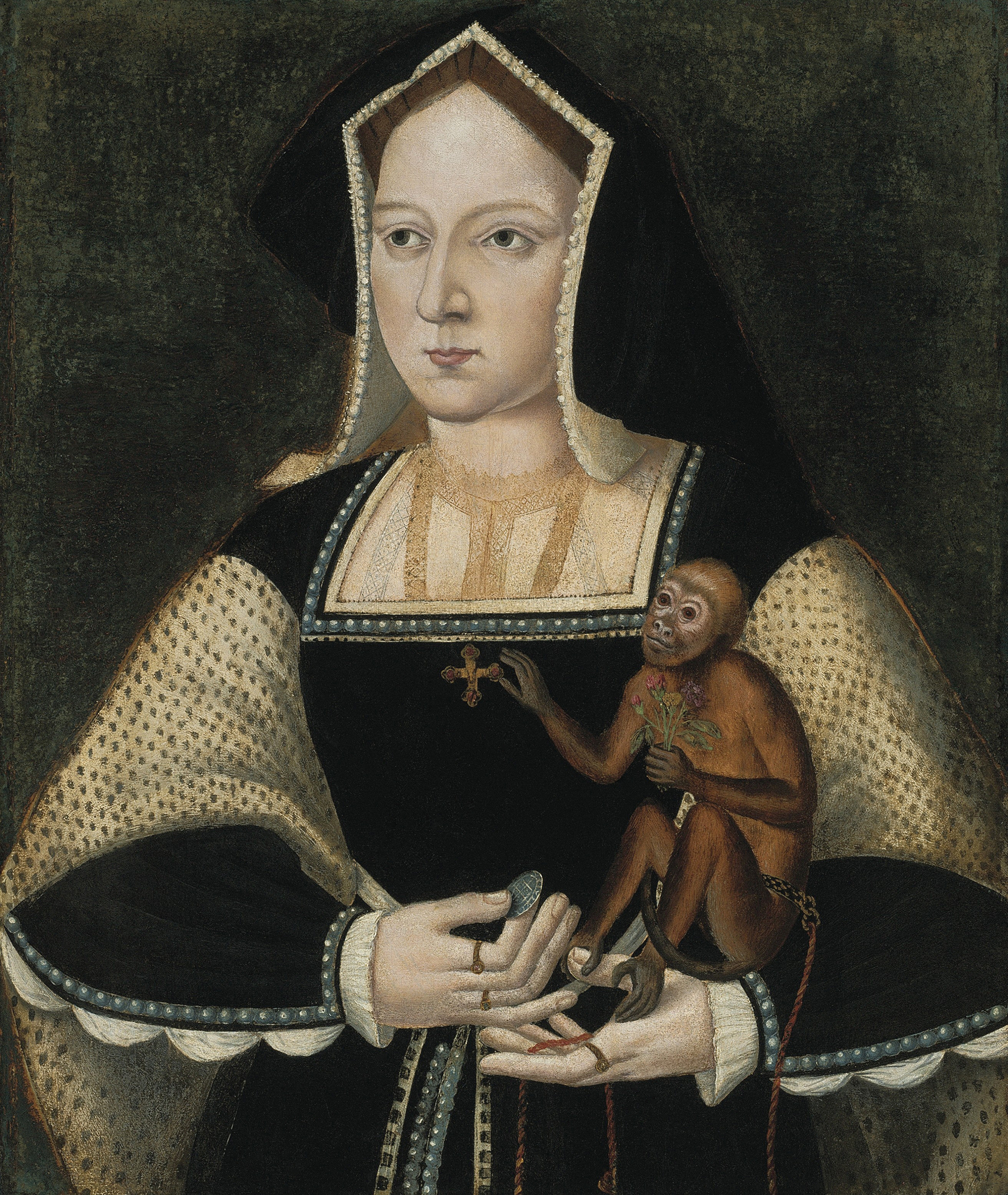
Catherine of Aragon
m. 1509–1533

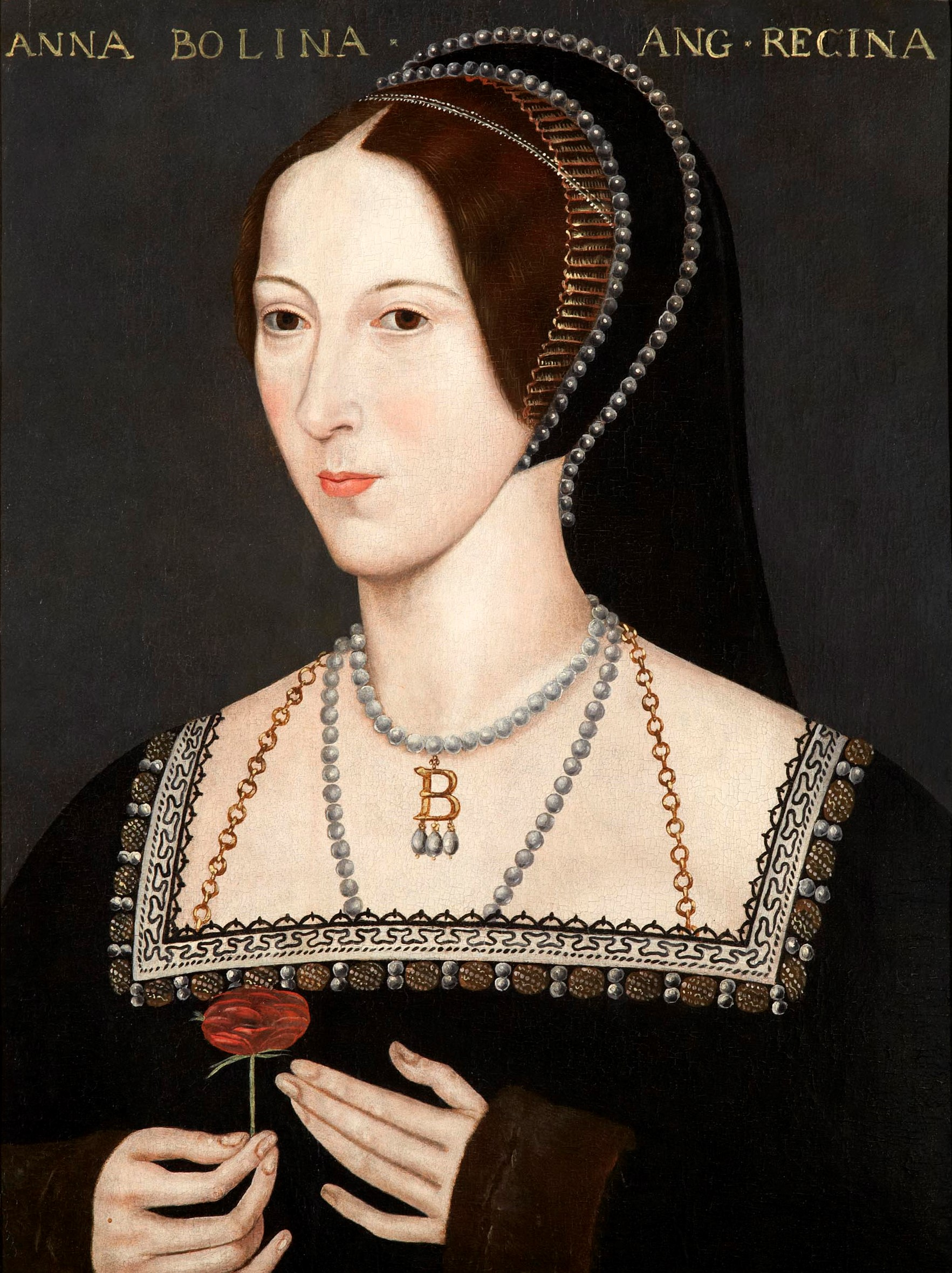
Anne Boleyn
m. 1532/1533–1536

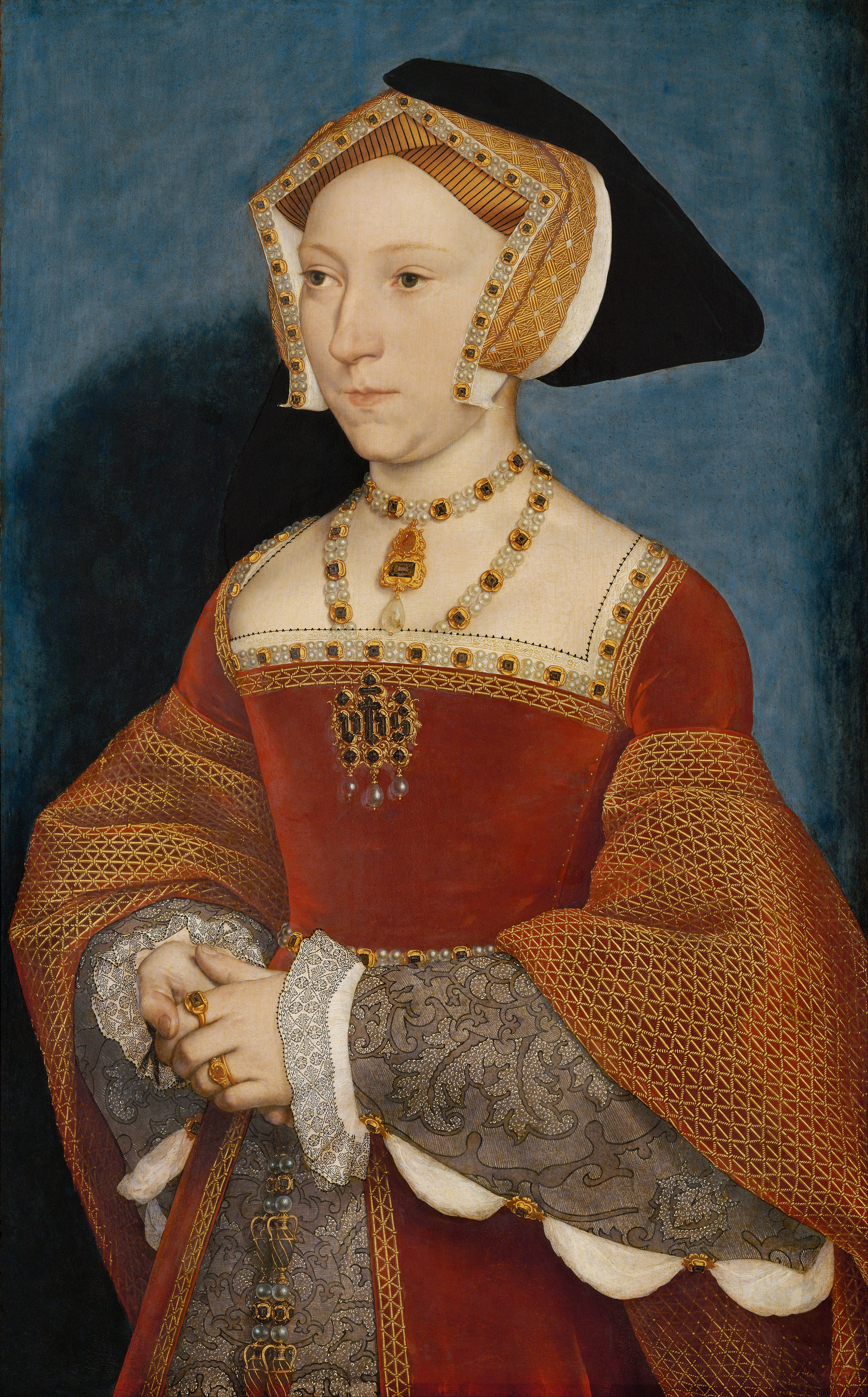
Jane Seymour
m. 1536–1537

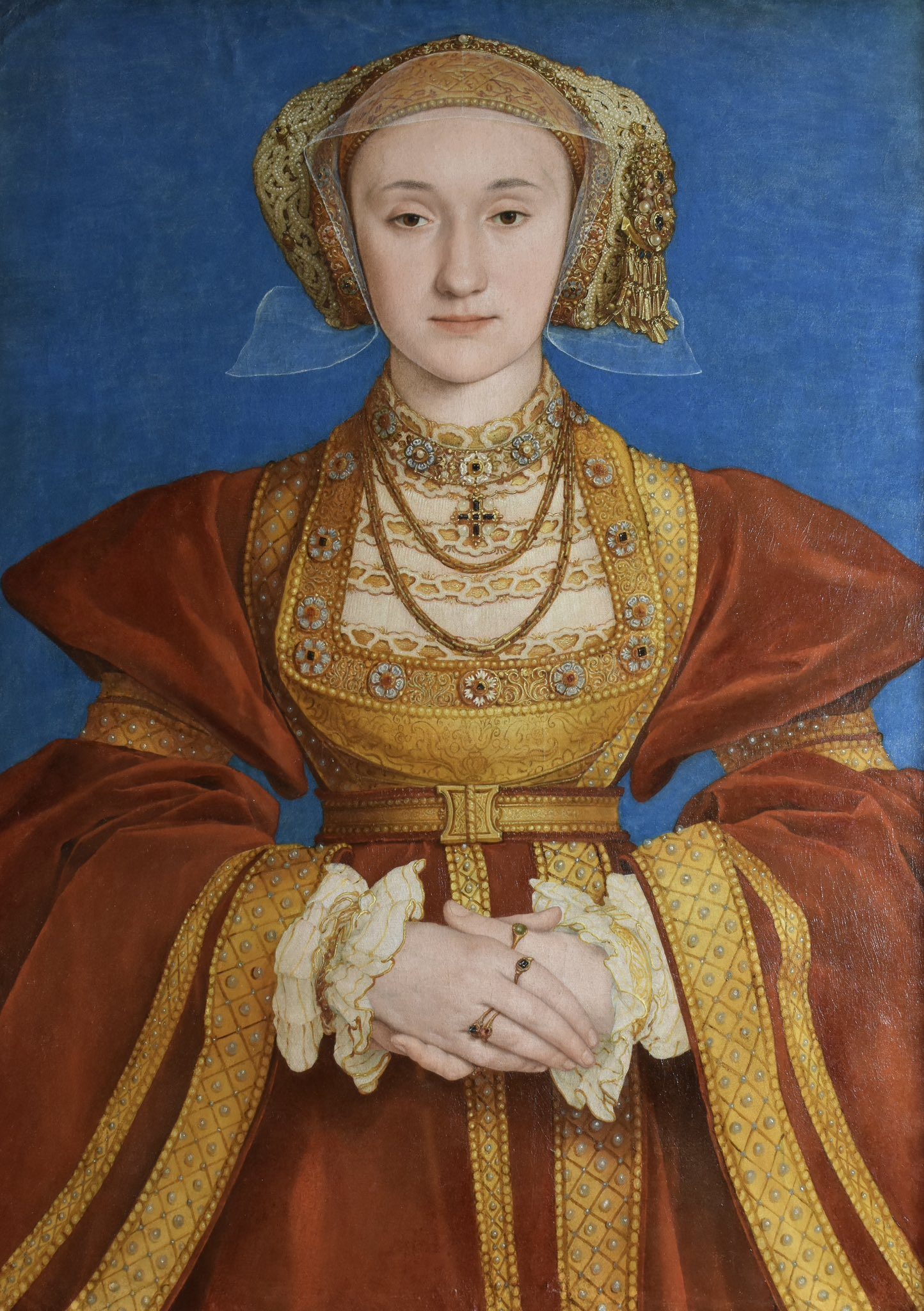
Anne of Cleves
m. 1540

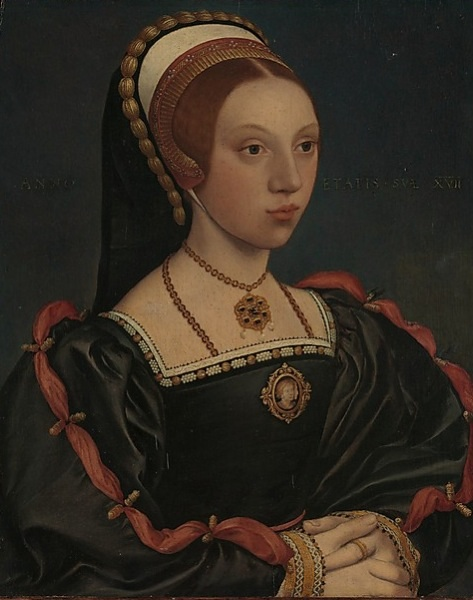
Catherine Howard
m. 1540–1542

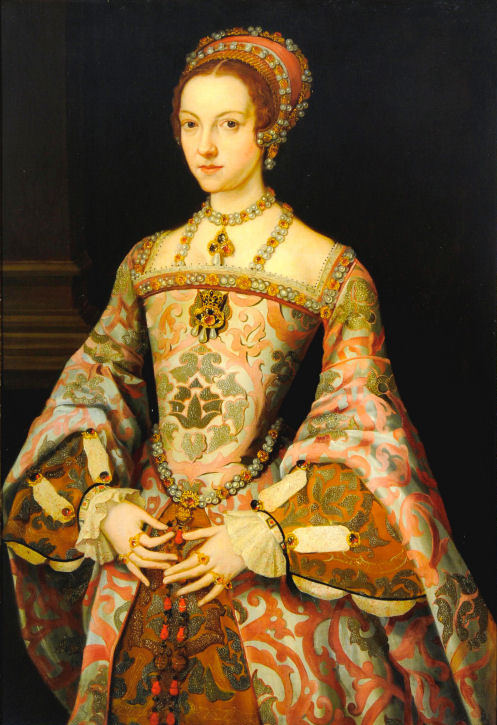
Catherine Parr
m. 1543–1547

Warnicke writes that Anne was "the perfect woman courtier ... her carriage was graceful and her French clothes were pleasing and stylish; she danced with ease, had a pleasant singing voice, played the lute and several other musical instruments well, and spoke French fluently ... A remarkable, intelligent, quick-witted young noblewoman ... that first drew people into conversation with her and then amused and entertained them. In short, her energy and vitality made her the center of attention in any social gathering". Henry VIII's biographer J. J. Scarisbrick adds that Anne "revelled in" the attention she received from her admirers.

During this time, Anne was courted by Henry Percy, son of the Earl of Northumberland, and entered into a secret betrothal with him. Thomas Wolsey's gentleman usher, George Cavendish, maintained the two had not been lovers. The romance was broken off when Percy's father refused to support their engagement. Wolsey refused the match for several conjectured reasons. According to Cavendish, Anne was sent from court to her family's countryside estates, but it is not known for how long. Upon her return to court, she again entered the service of Catherine of Aragon. Percy was married to Lady Mary Talbot, to whom he had been betrothed since adolescence.

Before marrying Henry VIII, Anne had befriended Sir Thomas Wyatt, one of the greatest poets of the Tudor period. In 1520, Wyatt married Elizabeth Cobham, who by many accounts was not a wife of his choosing. In 1525, Wyatt charged his wife with adultery and separated from her; coincidentally, historians believe that it was also the year when his interest in Anne intensified. In 1532, Wyatt accompanied the royal couple to Calais.

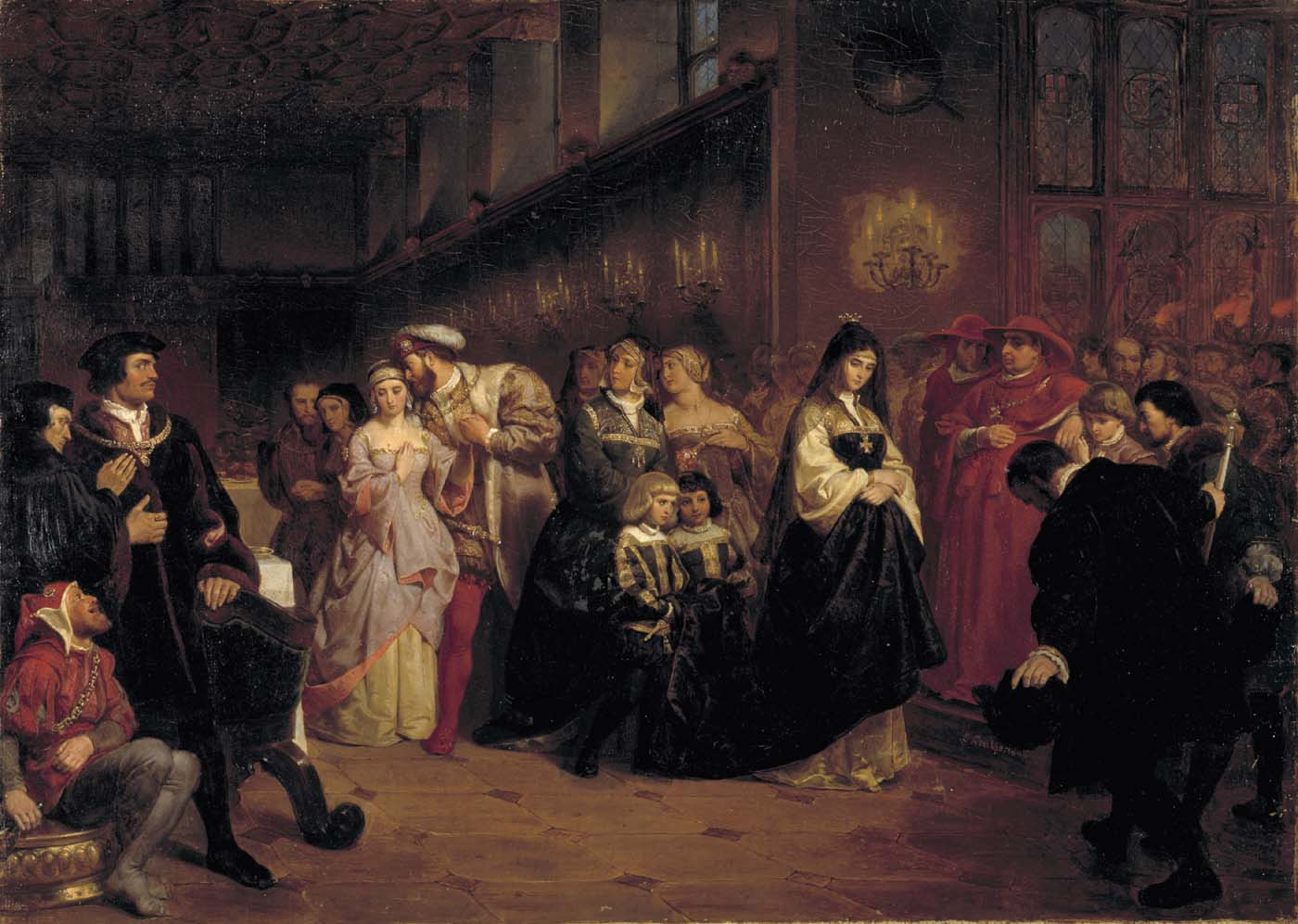
The Courtship of Anne Boleyn (19th century depiction of Anne Boleyn and Henry VIII's early courtship) by Emanuel Gottlieb Leutze (1846)

In 1526, Henry VIII became enamoured of Anne and began his pursuit. Anne was a skilful player at the game of courtly love, which was often played in the antechambers. This may have been how she caught the eye of Henry, who was also an experienced player. Anne resisted Henry's attempts to seduce her, refusing to become his mistress, and often left the court for the seclusion of Hever Castle. But within a year, he proposed marriage to her, and she accepted. Both assumed an annulment could be obtained within months. There is no evidence to suggest that they engaged in a sexual relationship until very shortly before their marriage; Henry's love letters to Anne suggest that their love affair remained unconsummated for much of their seven-year courtship.

=== Henry's annulment ===
It is probable that Henry had thought of the idea of annulment (not divorce as commonly assumed) much earlier than this as he strongly desired a male heir to secure the Tudor claim to the crown. Before Henry VII ascended the throne, England was beset by civil warfare over rival claims to the crown, and Henry VIII wanted to avoid similar uncertainty over the succession. He and Catherine had no living sons: all Catherine's children except Mary died in infancy. Catherine had first come to England to be bride to Henry's brother Arthur, Prince of Wales, who died soon after their marriage. Since Spain and England still wanted an alliance, Pope Julius II granted a dispensation for their marriage on the grounds that Catherine was "perchance" (forsum) still a virgin.

Catherine and Henry married in 1509, but eventually he became dubious about the marriage's validity, claiming that Catherine's inability to provide an heir was a sign of God's displeasure. His feelings for Anne, and her refusals to become his mistress, probably contributed to Henry's decision that no pope had a right to overrule the Bible. This meant that he had been living in sin with Catherine, although Catherine hotly contested this and refused to concede that her marriage to Arthur had been consummated. It also meant that his daughter Mary was a bastard, and that the new pope (Clement VII) would have to admit the previous pope's mistake and annul the marriage. Henry's quest for an annulment became euphemistically known as the "King's Great Matter".

Anne saw an opportunity in Henry's infatuation and the convenient moral quandary. She determined that she would yield to his embraces only as his acknowledged queen. She began to take her place at his side in policy and in state, but not yet in his bed.

Scholars and historians hold various opinions as to how deep Anne's commitment to the Reformation was, how much she was perhaps only personally ambitious, and how much she had to do with Henry's defiance of papal power: Ives, Maria Dowling and David Starkey are among those who believe that she was a devout evangelical, whereas Warnicke and George Bernard hold that her religious beliefs were "conventional". Warnicke acknowledges that Anne promoted vernacular (French or English) editions of the Bible, but remained, "deep seated[ly], a Catholic". There is anecdotal evidence, related to biographer George Wyatt by her former lady-in-waiting Anne Gainsford, that Anne brought to Henry's attention a heretical pamphlet, perhaps William Tyndale's The Obedience of a Christian Man or one by Simon Fish called A Supplication for the Beggars, which cried out to monarchs to rein in the evil excesses of the Catholic Church. She was sympathetic to those seeking further reformation of the Church, and actively protected scholars working on English translations of the scriptures. According to Maria Dowling, "Anne tried to educate her waiting-women in scriptural piety" and is believed to have reproved her cousin, Mary Shelton, for "having 'idle poesies' written in her prayer book."

In 1528, sweating sickness broke out with great severity. In London, the mortality rate was great and the court was dispersed. Henry left London, frequently changing his residence; Anne Boleyn retreated to the Boleyn residence at Hever Castle, but contracted the illness; her brother-in-law, William Carey, died. Henry sent his own physician to Hever Castle to care for Anne, and shortly afterwards she recovered.

Henry was soon absorbed in securing an annulment from Catherine. He set his hopes upon a direct appeal to the Holy See, acting independently of Wolsey, to whom he at first communicated nothing of his plans. In 1527 William Knight, the King's secretary, was sent to Pope Clement VII to sue for the annulment of Henry's marriage to Catherine, on the grounds that the dispensing bull of Julius II permitting him to marry his brother's widow, Catherine, had been obtained under false pretences. Henry also petitioned, in the event of his becoming free, a dispensation to contract a new marriage with any woman even in the first degree of affinity, whether the affinity was contracted by lawful or unlawful connection. This referred to Anne.

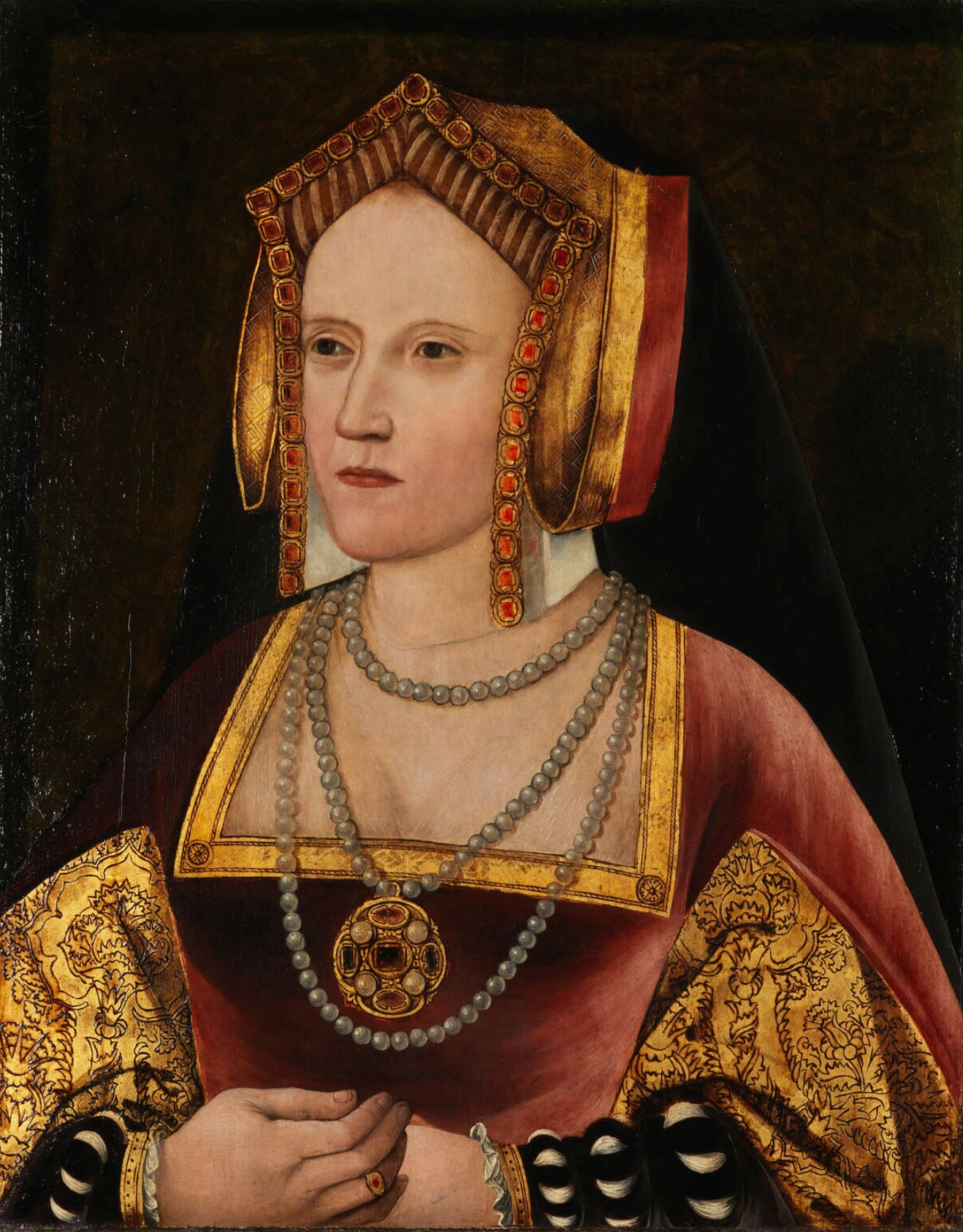
16th-century portrait of Catherine of Aragon, Henry's first wife, by an unidentified English painter

As Clement was at that time a prisoner of Charles V, the Holy Roman Emperor, as a result of the Sack of Rome in May 1527, Knight had some difficulty obtaining access. In the end he had to return with a conditional dispensation, which Wolsey insisted was technically insufficient. Henry then had no choice but to put his great matter into Wolsey's hands, who did all he could to secure a decision in Henry's favour, even going so far as to convene an ecclesiastical court in England, with a special emissary, Lorenzo Campeggio, from Clement to decide the matter. But Clement had not empowered his deputy to make a decision. He was still Charles V's hostage, and Charles V was loyal to his aunt Catherine. The Pope forbade Henry to contract a new marriage until a decision was reached in Rome, not in England. Convinced that Wolsey's loyalties lay with the Pope, not England, Anne, as well as Wolsey's many enemies, ensured his dismissal from public office in 1529. Cavendish, Wolsey's chamberlain, records that the servants who waited on the King and Anne at dinner in 1529 in Grafton heard her say that the dishonour Wolsey had brought upon the realm would have cost any other Englishman his head. Henry replied, "Why then I perceive ... you are not the Cardinal's friend.". Henry finally agreed to Wolsey's arrest on grounds of praemunire. Had it not been for his death from illness in 1530, Wolsey might have been executed for treason. In 1531 (two years before Henry's marriage to Anne), Catherine was banished from court and her rooms given to Anne.

Public support remained with Catherine. One evening, in the autumn of 1531, Anne was dining at a manor house on the River Thames and was almost seized by a crowd of angry women. Anne just managed to escape by boat.

When Archbishop of Canterbury William Warham died in 1532, the Boleyn family chaplain, Thomas Cranmer, was appointed, with papal approval.

In 1532, Thomas Cromwell brought before Parliament a number of acts, including the Supplication against the Ordinaries and Submission of the Clergy, which recognised royal supremacy over the church, thus finalising the break with Rome. Following these acts, Thomas More resigned as Lord Chancellor, leaving Cromwell as Henry's chief minister.

=== Premarital role and marriage ===
Even before her marriage, Anne Boleyn was able to grant petitions, receive diplomats and give patronage, and had an influence over Henry to plead the cause of foreign diplomats.

Anne's personal badge prior to becoming queen

During this period, Anne played an important role in England's international position by solidifying an alliance with France. She established an excellent rapport with the French ambassador, Gilles de la Pommeraie. On 1 September 1532, Henry granted Anne the Marquessate of Pembroke, an appropriate peerage for a future queen. Anne was a former lady-in-waiting at the French court, and the new title was a necessary mark of her new status before she and Henry attended a meeting with the French king Francis I at Calais in winter 1532. Henry hoped to enlist Francis's public support for the intended marriage. Henry performed the investiture himself, with de la Pommeraie as guest of honour.

Henry lost fifteen shillings playing cards with Anne on 11 November. The conference at Calais was a political triumph, but even though the French government gave implicit support for Henry's remarriage and Francis I had a private conference with Anne, the French king maintained alliances with the Pope that he could not explicitly defy.

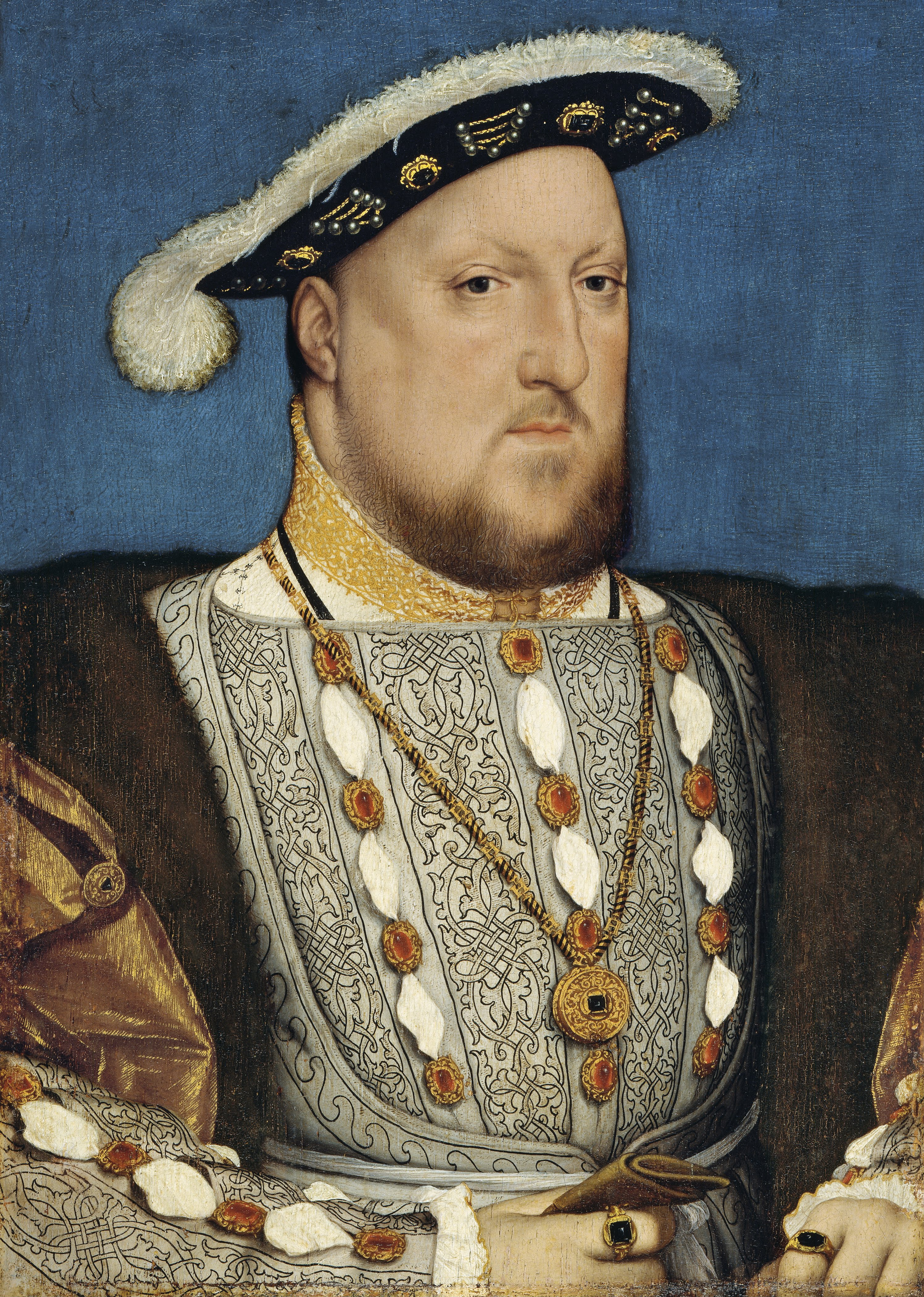
Portrait of Henry VIII by Hans Holbein the Younger, c. 1537

Anne's family also profited from the relationship. Her father, already Viscount Rochford, was created Earl of Wiltshire. Henry also came to an arrangement with Anne's Irish cousin and created him Earl of Ormond. At the magnificent banquet to celebrate her father's elevation, Anne took precedence over the Duchesses of Suffolk and Norfolk, seated in the place of honour beside the King that was usually occupied by the Queen. Thanks to Anne's intervention, her widowed sister Mary received an annual pension of £100 (although later, when Mary remarried, Anne was to countermand this) and Mary's son, Henry Carey, was educated at the prestigious Brigettine nunnery of Syon Abbey. Anne arranged for Nicholas Bourbon, exiled from France for his support for religious reform, to be Henry's tutor there.

Soon after returning to Dover, Henry and Anne married in a secret ceremony on 14 November 1532. She soon became pregnant and as the first wedding was considered to be unlawful at the time, a second wedding service, also private in accordance with the precedents established in The Royal Book, took place in London on 25 January 1533. On 23 May 1533, Cranmer (who had been hastened, with the Pope's assent, into the position of Archbishop of Canterbury recently vacated by the death of Warham) sat in judgement at a special court convened at Dunstable Priory to rule on the validity of Henry's marriage to Catherine. He declared it null and void. Five days later, on 28 May 1533, Cranmer declared the marriage of Henry and Anne good and valid.

Family tree of the wives of Henry VIII

King Henry VIII, both of his parents, and all six of his wives were related through a common ancestor, King Edward I of England. See also: Mistresses of Henry VIII

Edward I 1239–1307; King of England
Margaret b. 1275; Duchess of Brabant	Elizabeth of Rhuddlan c. 1282–1316; Countess of Hereford	Edward II; 1284–1327; King of England
John III; 1300–1355; Duke of Brabant	William de Bohun; 1312–1360; Earl of Northampton	Edward III; 1312–1377; King of England
Margaret of Brabant; 1323–1380; Countess of Flanders	Lionel of Antwerp; 1338–1368; Duke of Clarence	Edmund of Langley; 1341–1402; Duke of York	John of Gaunt; 1340–1399; Duke of Lancaster
Margaret III; 1350–1405; Countess of Flanders	Elizabeth Fitzalan c. 1350–1385; Countess of Arundel	Philippa; 1355–1382; Countess of Ulster
John; 1371–1419; Duke of Burgundy	Elizabeth Fitzalan; 1366–1425; Duchess of Norfolk	Elizabeth Mortimer; 1371–1417	Roger Mortimer; 1374–1398; Earl of March	John Beaufort c. 1371–1410; Earl of Somerset	Catherine; 1373–1418; Queen of Castile	Joan Beaufort c. 1379–1440; Countess of Westmorland
Mary; 1393–1466; Duchess of Cleves	Margaret de Mowbray b. 1388	Elizabeth c. 1395–1436; Baroness de Clifford	Anne de Mortimer; 1388–c. 1411	Richard of Conisburgh; 1385–1415; Earl of Cambridge	John Beaufort; 1404–1444; Duke of Somerset	John II; 1405–1454; King of Castile	Richard Neville; 1400–1460; Earl of Salisbury
John I 1419–1481; Duke of Cleves	John Howard c. 1425–1485; Duke of Norfolk	Mary Clifford	Richard; 1411–1460; Duke of York	Alice Neville b. c. 1430; Baroness FitzHugh
John II; 1458–1521; Duke of Cleves	Thomas Howard; 1443–1524; Duke of Norfolk	Henry Wentworth c. 1448–1499/1501	Edward IV; 1442–1483; King of England	Margaret Beaufort; 1441/43–1509	Isabella I 1451–1504; Queen of Castile	Elizabeth FitzHugh c. 1455/1465–bef. 1507
John III; 1490–1538/1539; Duke of Cleves	Edmund Howard c. 1478–1539	Elizabeth Boleyn c. 1480–1538; Countess of Wiltshire	Margery Wentworth c. 1478–1550	Elizabeth of York; 1466–1503	Henry VII; 1457–1509; King of England	Thomas Parr c. 1483–1517
Anne of Cleves; 1515–1557; 4th wife: 1540	Catherine Howard c. 1524–1542; 5th wife: 1540–1542	Anne Boleyn c. 1507–1536; 2nd wife: 1533–1536	Jane Seymour c. 1508–1537; 3rd wife: 1536–1537	Henry VIII; 1491–1547; King of England	Catherine of Aragon; 1485–1536; 1st wife: 1509–1533	Catherine Parr; 1512–1548; 6th wife: 1543–1547
Elizabeth I 1533–1603; Queen of England	Edward VI; 1537–1553; King of England	Mary I 1516–1558; Queen of England

== Queen of England: 1533–1536 ==
Anne Boleyn's coat of arms as queen consort

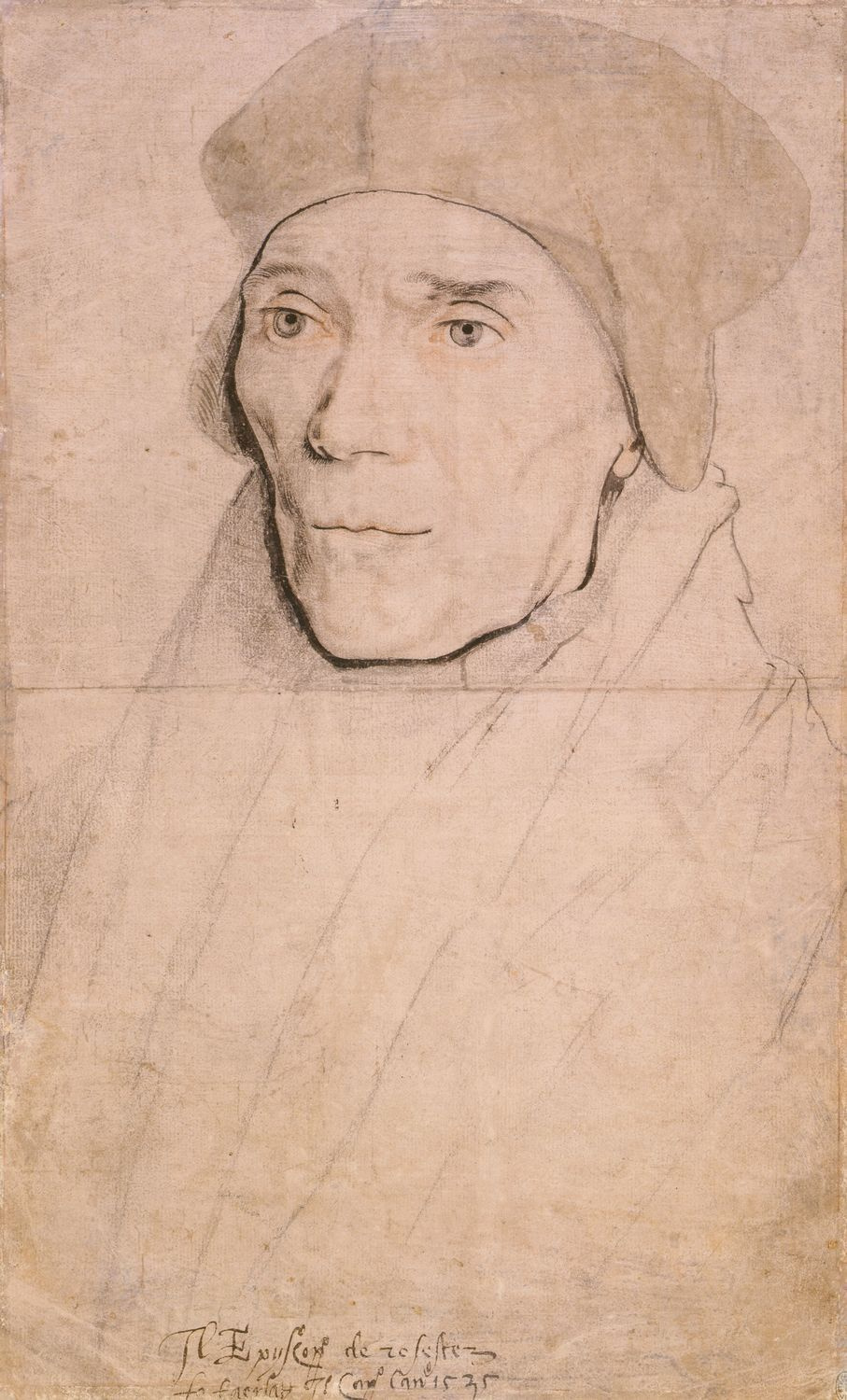
Bishop John Fisher, by Hans Holbein the Younger. Fisher refused to recognise Henry's marriage to Anne.

Catherine was formally stripped of her title as queen and Anne was consequently crowned queen consort on 1 June 1533 in a magnificent ceremony at Westminster Abbey with a banquet afterwards. She was the last queen consort of England to be crowned separately from her husband. Unlike any other queen consort, Anne was crowned with St Edward's Crown, which had previously been used to crown only monarchs. Historian Alice Hunt suggests that this was done because Anne's pregnancy was visible by then and the child was presumed to be male. On the previous day, Anne had taken part in an elaborate procession through the streets of London seated in a litter of "white cloth of gold" that rested on two palfreys clothed to the ground in white damask, while the barons of the Cinque Ports held a canopy of cloth of gold over her head. In accordance with tradition, she wore white, and on her head, a gold coronet beneath which her long dark hair hung down freely. The public's response to her appearance was lukewarm.

Meanwhile, the House of Commons had forbidden all appeals to Rome and exacted the penalties of praemunire against all who introduced papal bulls into England, by introducing the Ecclesiastical Appeals Act 1532 (24 Hen. 8 c. 12). It was only then that Pope Clement, at last, took the step of announcing a provisional excommunication of Henry and Cranmer. He condemned the marriage to Anne, and in March 1534 declared the marriage to Catherine legal and again ordered Henry to return to her. Henry now required his subjects to swear an oath attached to the First Succession Act, which effectively rejected papal authority in legal matters and recognised Anne Boleyn as queen. Those who refused, such as Sir Thomas More, who had resigned as Lord Chancellor, and John Fisher, Bishop of Rochester, were placed in the Tower of London. In late 1534 parliament declared Henry "the only supreme head on earth of the Church of England". The Church in England was now under Henry's control, not Rome's. On 14 May 1534, in one of the realm's first official acts protecting Protestant Reformers, Anne wrote a letter to Thomas Cromwell seeking his aid in ensuring that English merchant Richard Herman be reinstated a member of the merchant adventurers in Antwerp and no longer persecuted simply because he had helped in "setting forth of the New testament in English". Before and after her coronation, Anne protected and promoted evangelicals and those wishing to study the scriptures of William Tyndale. She had a decisive role in influencing the Protestant reformer Matthew Parker to attend court as her chaplain, and before her death entrusted her daughter to Parker's care.

=== Struggle for a son ===
After her coronation, Anne settled into a quiet routine at the King's favourite residence, Greenwich Palace, to prepare for the birth of her baby. The child was a girl, born slightly prematurely on 7 September 1533. She was christened Elizabeth, probably in honour of either Anne's mother Elizabeth Howard or Henry's mother Elizabeth of York, or both. The birth of a girl was a heavy blow to her parents, who had confidently expected a boy. All but one of the royal physicians and astrologers had predicted a son and the French king had been asked to stand as his godfather. Now the prepared letters announcing the birth of a prince had an s hastily added to them to read princes[s] and the traditional jousting tournament for the birth of an heir was cancelled. The infant princess, however, was given a splendid christening.

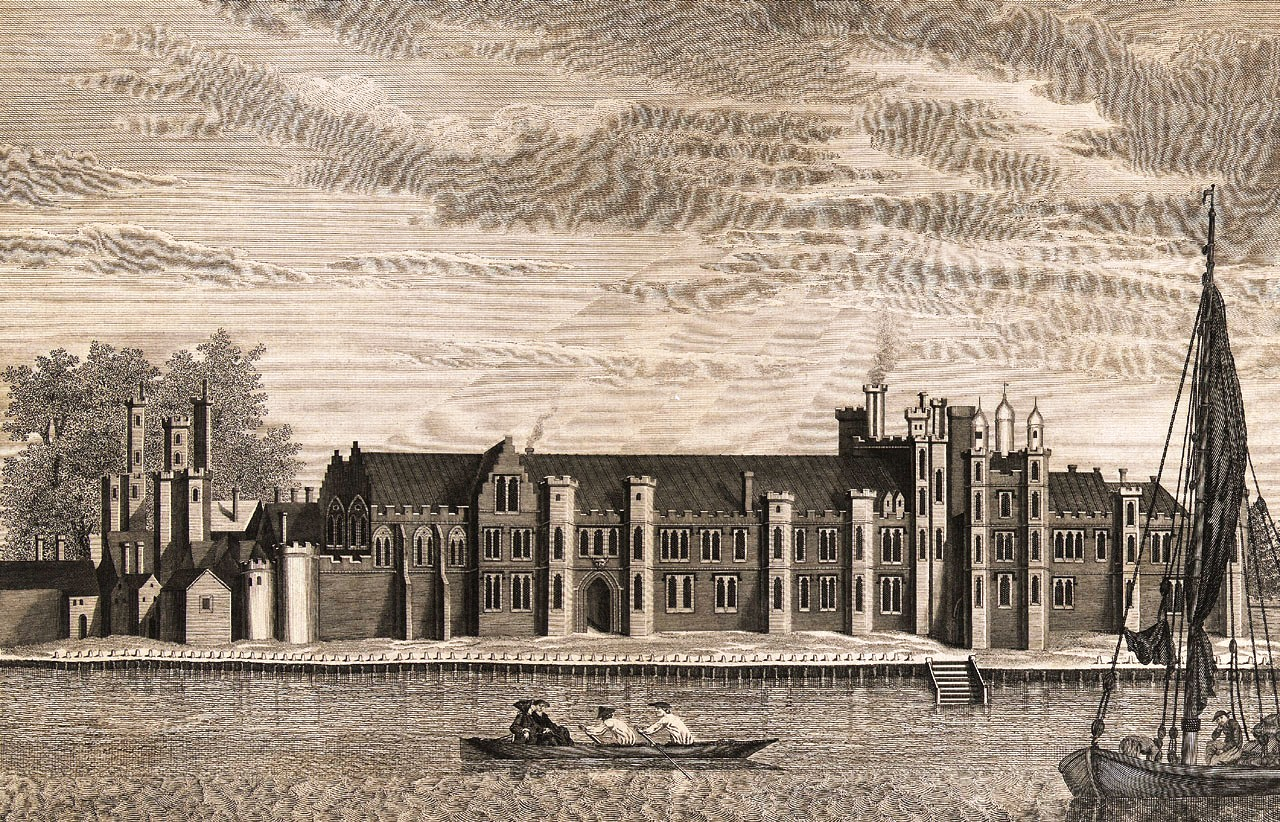
Greenwich Palace, also known as the Palace of Placentia, after a 17th-century drawing

Another disappointment followed on 29 January 1536, when, to Henry's "great distress", Anne miscarried a male child which, according to ambassador Chapuys, had been of 3 1/2 months' gestation.

Anne feared that Catherine's daughter Mary, now in consequence stripped of her title of princess and labelled a bastard, posed a threat to Elizabeth's position. Henry soothed his wife's fears by separating Mary from her many servants and sending her to live at Hatfield House, where Elizabeth would also reside with her own sizeable staff of servants as the country air was thought better for the baby's health. Anne frequently visited her daughter at Hatfield and other residences.

The new queen had a larger staff of servants than Catherine. There were more than 250 servants to tend to her personal needs, from priests to stable boys, and more than 60 maids-of-honour who served her and accompanied her to social events. She also employed several priests to act as her confessors, chaplains and religious advisers. One of these was Matthew Parker, who became one of the chief architects of Anglican thought during the reign of Anne's daughter, Elizabeth I.

=== Strife with the king ===
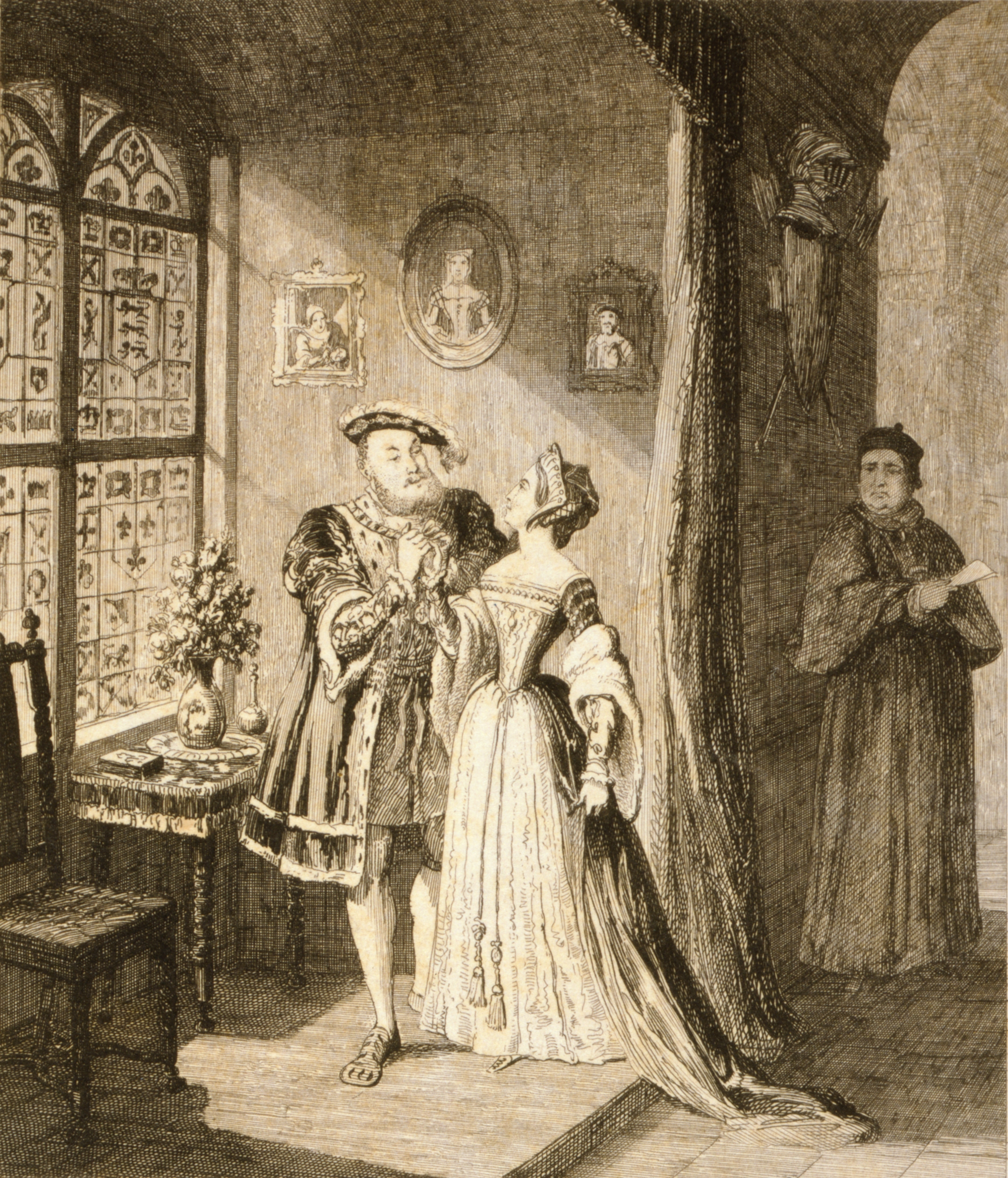
Henry's reconciliation with Anne Boleyn, by George Cruikshank, 19th century

The King and his new queen enjoyed a reasonably happy accord with periods of calm and affection. Anne's sharp intelligence, political acumen and forward manner, although desirable in a mistress, were at the time unacceptable in a wife. She was once reported to have spoken to her uncle in words that "shouldn't be used to a dog". After miscarriage or stillbirth in summer 1534, Henry was discussing with Cranmer and Cromwell the possibility of divorcing her without having to return to Catherine. Nothing came of the matter as the royal couple reconciled and spent the summer of 1535 on progress, visiting Gloucester and hunting in the local countryside. By October, she was again pregnant.

Anne presided over a court within the royal household. She spent lavish amounts of money on gowns, jewels, head-dresses, ostrich-feather fans, riding equipment, furniture and upholstery, maintaining the ostentatious display required by her status. Numerous palaces were renovated to suit the extravagant tastes she and Henry shared. Her motto was "The most happy", and she chose a white falcon as her personal device.

Anne was blamed for Henry's tyranny and called by some of her subjects "the king's whore" or a "naughty paike [prostitute]". Public opinion turned further against her after the marriage produced no male heir. It sank even lower after the executions of her enemies More and Fisher.

== Downfall and execution: 1536 ==
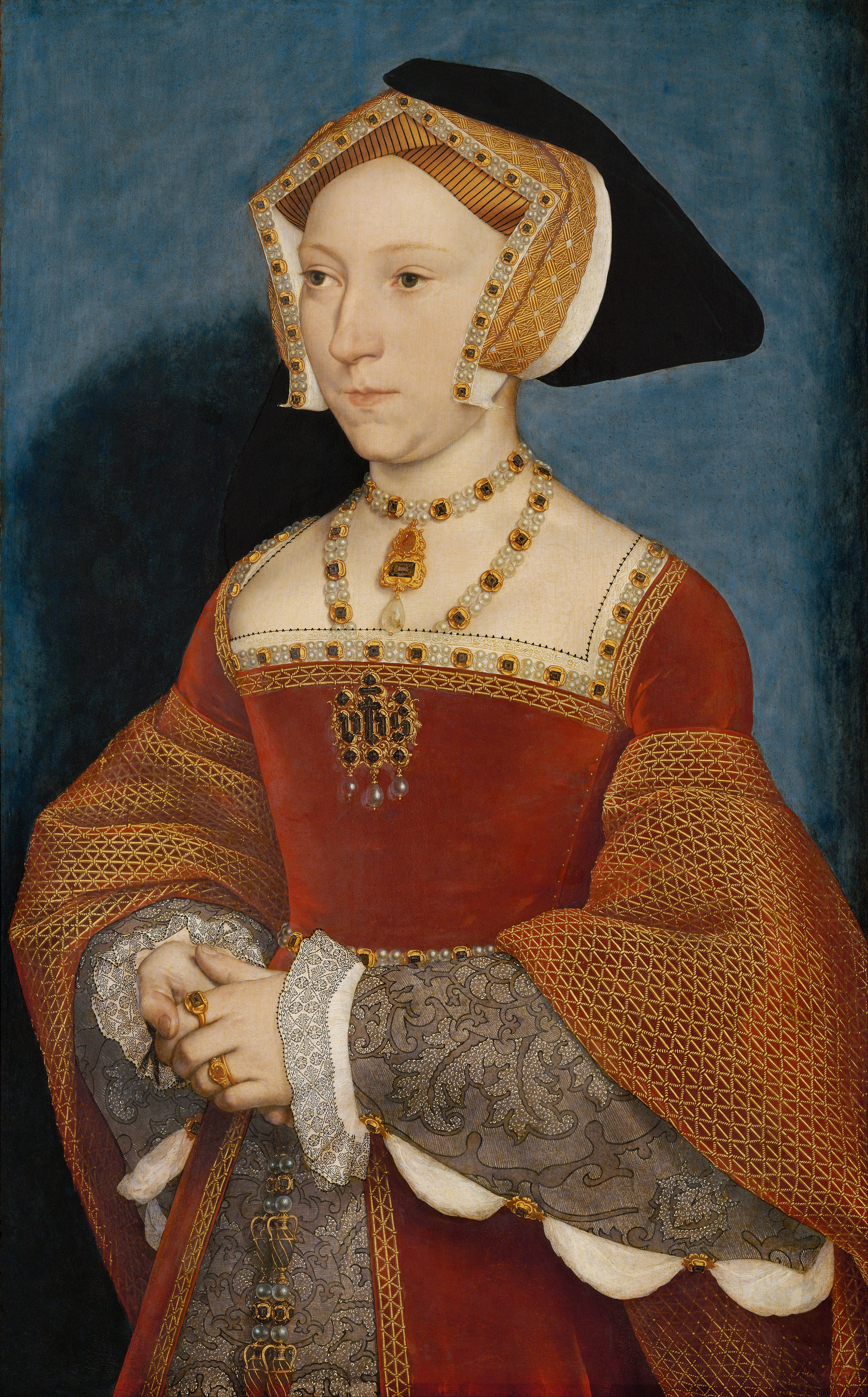
Shortly after Anne's execution, Jane Seymour became Henry's third wife.

On 8 January 1536, news of Catherine of Aragon's death reached Anne and the King, who was overjoyed. The following day, Henry wore yellow, a symbol of joy and celebration in England but of mourning in Spain, from head to toe, and celebrated Catherine's death with festivities. With Catherine dead, Anne attempted to make peace with Mary. Mary rebuffed Anne's overtures, perhaps because of rumours circulating that Catherine had been poisoned by Anne or Henry. These began after the discovery during her embalming that Catherine's heart was blackened. Modern medical experts are in agreement that this was not the result of poisoning, but from heart cancer, the cause of her death and an extremely rare condition that was not understood at the time.

Queen Anne, pregnant again, was aware of the dangers if she failed to give birth to a son. With Catherine dead, Henry would be free to marry without any taint of illegality. At this time, Henry began paying court to one of Anne's maids-of-honour, Jane Seymour, and allegedly gave her a locket containing a portrait miniature of himself. While wearing this locket in the presence of Anne, Jane began opening and closing it. Anne responded by ripping the locket off Jane's neck with such force that her fingers bled.

Later that month, the King was unhorsed in a tournament and knocked unconscious for two hours, a worrying incident that Anne believed led to her miscarriage five days later. Another possible cause of the miscarriage was an incident in which, upon entering a room, Anne saw Jane Seymour sitting on Henry's lap and flew into a rage. Whatever the cause, on the day that Catherine of Aragon was buried at Peterborough Abbey, Anne miscarried a baby which, according to the Imperial ambassador Eustace Chapuys, she had borne for about three and a half months, and which "seemed to be a male child". Chapuys commented "She has miscarried of her saviour." In Chapuys's opinion, this loss was the beginning of the end of the royal marriage.

Given Henry's desperate desire for a son, the sequence of Anne's pregnancies has attracted much interest. Mike Ashley speculated that Anne had two stillborn children after Elizabeth's birth and before the male child she miscarried in 1536. Gynaecologist John Dewhurst studied the sequence of the birth of Elizabeth in September 1533 and the series of reported miscarriages that followed, including the miscarriage of a male child of almost four months' gestation in January 1536, and postulates that, instead of a series of miscarriages, Anne was experiencing pseudocyesis, a condition "occur[ing] in women desperate to prove their fertility".

As Anne recovered from her miscarriage, Henry declared that he had been seduced into the marriage by means of "sortileges" – a French term indicating either "deception" or "spells". His new favourite Jane Seymour was quickly moved into royal quarters at Greenwich; Jane's brother Edward and his wife, for the sake of propriety, moved with her. (Note: The rooms had previously been occupied by the King's secretary, Thomas Cromwell, and were connected to those of the King by hidden passageways.) This was followed by Anne's brother George Boleyn's being refused the prestigious honour of the Order of the Garter, given instead to Sir Nicholas Carew.

=== Charges of adultery, incest and treason ===
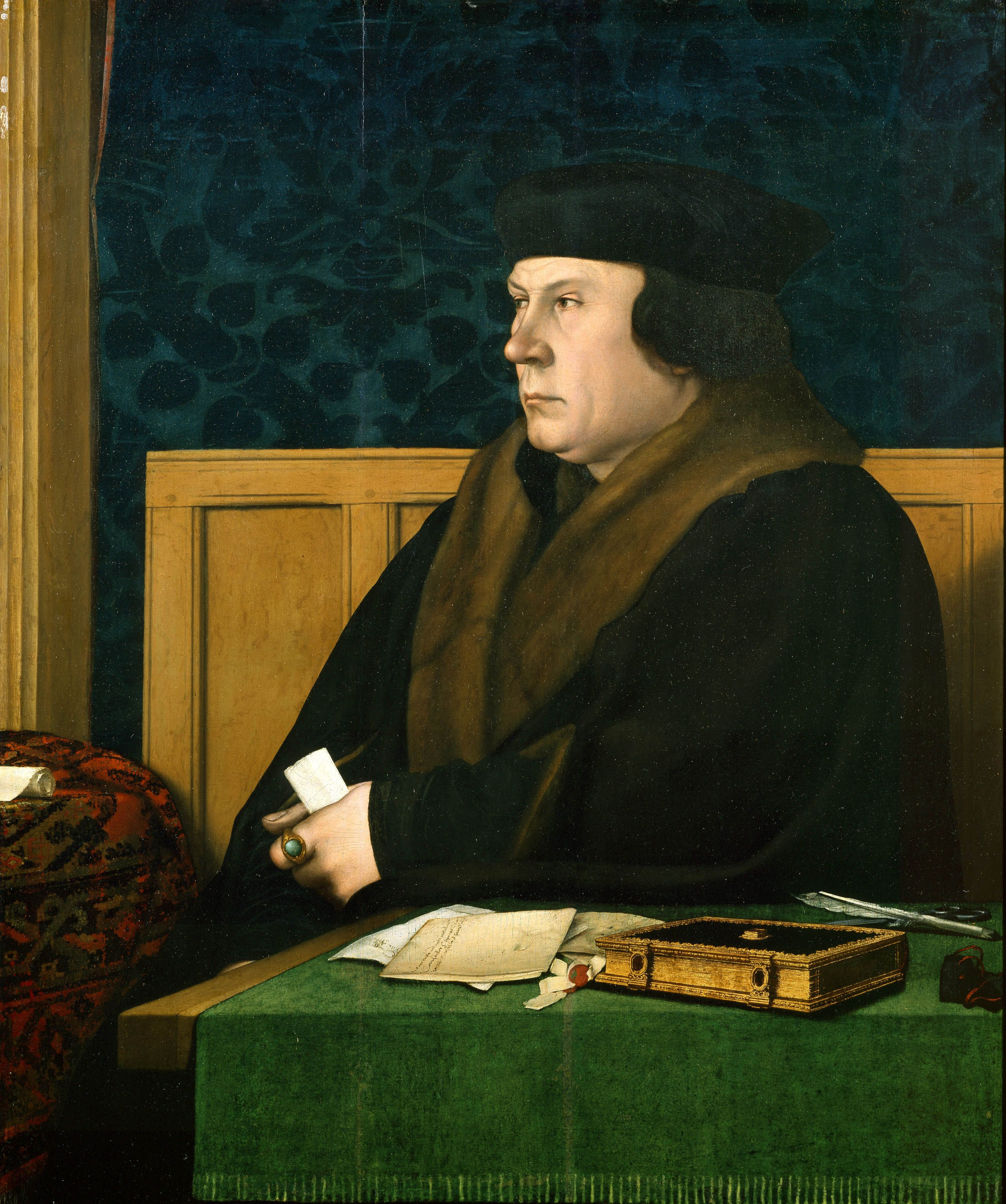
Thomas Cromwell, Anne's one-time strong ally, with whom she clashed over foreign policy and the redistribution of church wealth. Portrait by Hans Holbein the Younger, c. 1532.

Anne's biographer Eric Ives believes that her fall and execution were primarily engineered by her former ally Thomas Cromwell. The conversations between Chapuys and Cromwell indicate Cromwell as the instigator of the plot to remove Anne; evidence of this is seen through letters written from Chapuys to Charles V. Anne argued with Cromwell over the redistribution of Church revenues and over foreign policy. She advocated that revenues be distributed to charitable and educational institutions; and she favoured a French alliance. Cromwell preferred an alliance with the Holy Roman Emperor and insisted on filling the King's depleted coffers. For these reasons, Ives suggests, "Anne Boleyn had become a major threat to Thomas Cromwell." Cromwell's biographer John Schofield, on the other hand, contends that no power struggle existed between Anne and Cromwell and that "not a trace can be found of a Cromwellian conspiracy against Anne ... Cromwell became involved in the royal marital drama only when Henry ordered him onto the case." Schofield claims that evidence for the power struggle between Anne and Cromwell comprises no more than "fly-by-night stories from Alesius and the Spanish Chronicle, (Note: The Spanish Chronicle was an unreliable contemporary account based on "hearsay and rumour" by an unknown author. One passage describes how the musician Mark Smeaton was supposedly hidden, naked, in Anne's confectionery cupboard and smuggled into her bedroom by a waiting-woman. One Thomas Percy, another member of Anne's household, became jealous and reported the affair to Cromwell.) words of Chapuys taken out of context, and an untrustworthy translation of the Calendar of State Papers." Cromwell did not manufacture the accusations of adultery, though he and other officials used them to bolster Henry's case against Anne. Warnicke questions whether Cromwell could have or wished to manipulate the King in such a matter. Such a bold attempt by Cromwell, given the limited evidence, could have risked his office, even his life. Henry himself issued the crucial instructions: his officials, including Cromwell, carried them out. The result was by modern standards a legal travesty; however, the rules of the time were not bent in order to assure a conviction; there was no need to tamper with rules that guaranteed the desired result since law at the time was an engine of state, not a mechanism for justice.

Towards the end of April, a Flemish musician in Anne's service named Mark Smeaton was arrested. He initially denied being the Queen's lover but later confessed, perhaps after being tortured or promised freedom. Another courtier, Sir Henry Norris, was arrested on May Day, but being an aristocrat, could not be tortured. Prior to his arrest, Norris was treated kindly by the King, who offered him his own horse to use on the May Day festivities. It seems likely that during the festivities, the King was notified of Smeaton's confession and it was shortly thereafter the alleged conspirators were arrested upon his orders. Norris denied his guilt and swore that Queen Anne was innocent; one of the most damaging pieces of evidence against Norris was an overheard conversation with Anne at the end of April, where she accused him of coming often to her chambers not to pay court to her lady-in-waiting Madge Shelton but to herself. Sir Francis Weston was arrested two days later on the same charge, as was Sir William Brereton, a groom of the King's Privy Chamber. Sir Thomas Wyatt, the poet and friend of the Boleyns who was allegedly infatuated with her before her marriage to the King, was also imprisoned for the same charge but later released, most likely due to his or his family's friendship with Cromwell. Sir Richard Page was also accused of having a sexual relationship with the Queen, but he was acquitted of all charges after further investigation could not implicate him with Anne. The final accused was Queen Anne's own brother, George Boleyn, arrested on charges of incest and treason. He was accused of two incidents of incest: November 1535 at Whitehall and the following month at Eltham.

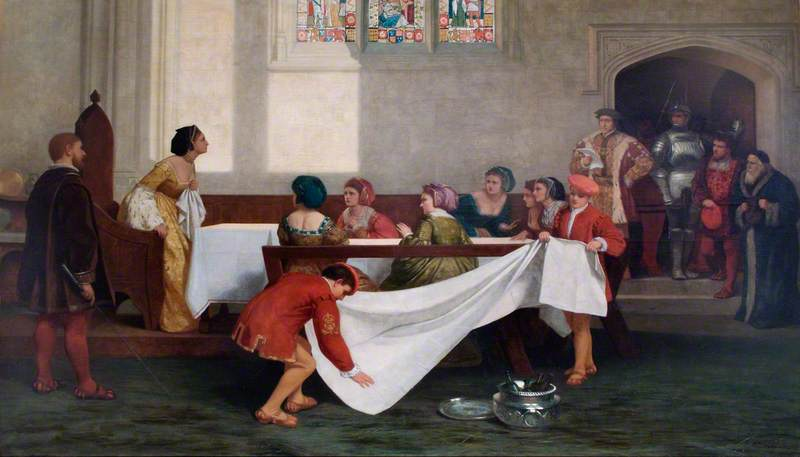
The Arrest of Anne Boleyn at Greenwich by David Wilkie Wynfield (1837-1887), Royal Armouries Museum collection, Tower of London

On 2 May 1536 Anne was arrested and taken to the Tower of London. In the Tower, initially she became hysterical, demanding to know the location of her father and her "sweet brother", as well as the charges against her. The charge was treason, in that she and the other defendants had intended Henry's death: the shock of the news of her adultery was alleged to have put his life at risk. (Note: Eric Ives points out that the King, amusing himself with Jane Seymour, was far from perturbed by any news of Anne's activities. The other strand of the indictment, that adultery with the Queen was a treasonable offence, had to be twisted to fit Cromwell's purported facts because this was a moral offence only, triable exclusively in the church courts.) Anne was taken by barge from Greenwich to the Tower of London and lodged in the royal apartments.

In what is reputed to be her last letter to Henry, dated 6 May, she wrote:

Sir,

Your Grace's displeasure, and my imprisonment are things so strange unto me, as what to write, or what to excuse, I am altogether ignorant. Whereas you send unto me (willing me to confess a truth, and so obtain your favour) by such an one, whom you know to be my ancient professed enemy. I no sooner received this message by him, than I rightly conceived your meaning; and if, as you say, confessing a truth indeed may procure my safety, I shall with all willingness and duty perform your demand.

But let not your Grace ever imagine, that your poor wife will ever be brought to acknowledge a fault, where not so much as a thought thereof preceded. And to speak a truth, never prince had wife more loyal in all duty, and in all true affection, than you have ever found in Anne Boleyn: with which name and place I could willingly have contented myself, if God and your Grace's pleasure had been so pleased. Neither did I at any time so far forget myself in my exaltation or received Queenship, but that I always looked for such an alteration as I now find; for the ground of my preferment being on no surer foundation than your Grace's fancy, the least alteration I knew was fit and sufficient to draw that fancy to some other object. You have chosen me, from a low estate, to be your Queen and companion, far beyond my desert or desire. If then you found me worthy of such honour, good your Grace let not any light fancy, or bad council of mine enemies, withdraw your princely favour from me; neither let that stain, that unworthy stain, of a disloyal heart toward your good grace, ever cast so foul a blot on your most dutiful wife, and the infant-princess your daughter. Try me, good king, but let me have a lawful trial, and let not my sworn enemies sit as my accusers and judges; yea let me receive an open trial, for my truth shall fear no open flame; then shall you see either my innocence cleared, your suspicion and conscience satisfied, the ignominy and slander of the world stopped, or my guilt openly declared. So that whatsoever God or you may determine of me, your grace may be freed of an open censure, and mine offense being so lawfully proved, your grace is at liberty, both before God and man, not only to execute worthy punishment on me as an unlawful wife, but to follow your affection, already settled on that party, for whose sake I am now as I am, whose name I could some good while since have pointed unto, your Grace being not ignorant of my suspicion therein. But if you have already determined of me, and that not only my death, but an infamous slander must bring you the enjoying of your desired happiness; then I desire of God, that he will pardon your great sin therein, and likewise mine enemies, the instruments thereof, and that he will not call you to a strict account of your unprincely and cruel usage of me, at his general judgment-seat, where both you and myself must shortly appear, and in whose judgment I doubt not (whatsoever the world may think of me) mine innocence shall be openly known, and sufficiently cleared. My last and only request shall be, that myself may only bear the burden of your Grace's displeasure, and that it may not touch the innocent souls of those poor gentlemen, who (as I understand) are likewise in strait imprisonment for my sake. If ever I found favour in your sight, if ever the name of Anne Boleyn hath been pleasing in your ears, then let me obtain this request, and I will so leave to trouble your Grace any further, with mine earnest prayers to the Trinity to have your Grace in his good keeping, and to direct you in all your actions. From my doleful prison in the Tower, this sixth of May;

Your most loyal and ever faithful wife,

Anne Boleyn. (Note: A copy of this letter was found among the papers of the King's secretary, Thomas Cromwell, after his execution.)

Four of the accused men were tried in Westminster on 12 May 1536. Weston, Brereton and Norris publicly maintained their innocence and only Smeaton supported the Crown by pleading guilty. Three days later, Anne and George Boleyn were tried separately in the Tower of London, before a jury of 27 peers. She was accused of adultery, incest, and high treason. The treason alleged against her (after Cromwell had used the nine days of her imprisonment to develop his case) was that of plotting the King's death, with her "lovers", so that she might later marry Henry Norris. One of Anne's ladies-in-waiting, the Countess of Worcester, gave evidence against her, claiming she had knowledge of the Queen's adultery with Henry Norris, Mark Smeaton, and Lord Rochford, the queen's brother. Anne's one-time betrothed, Henry Percy, 6th Earl of Northumberland, sat on the jury that unanimously found her guilty. When the verdict was announced, he collapsed and had to be carried from the courtroom. He died childless eight months later and was succeeded by his nephew.

On 17 May, Cranmer declared Anne's marriage to Henry null and void.

=== Final hours ===
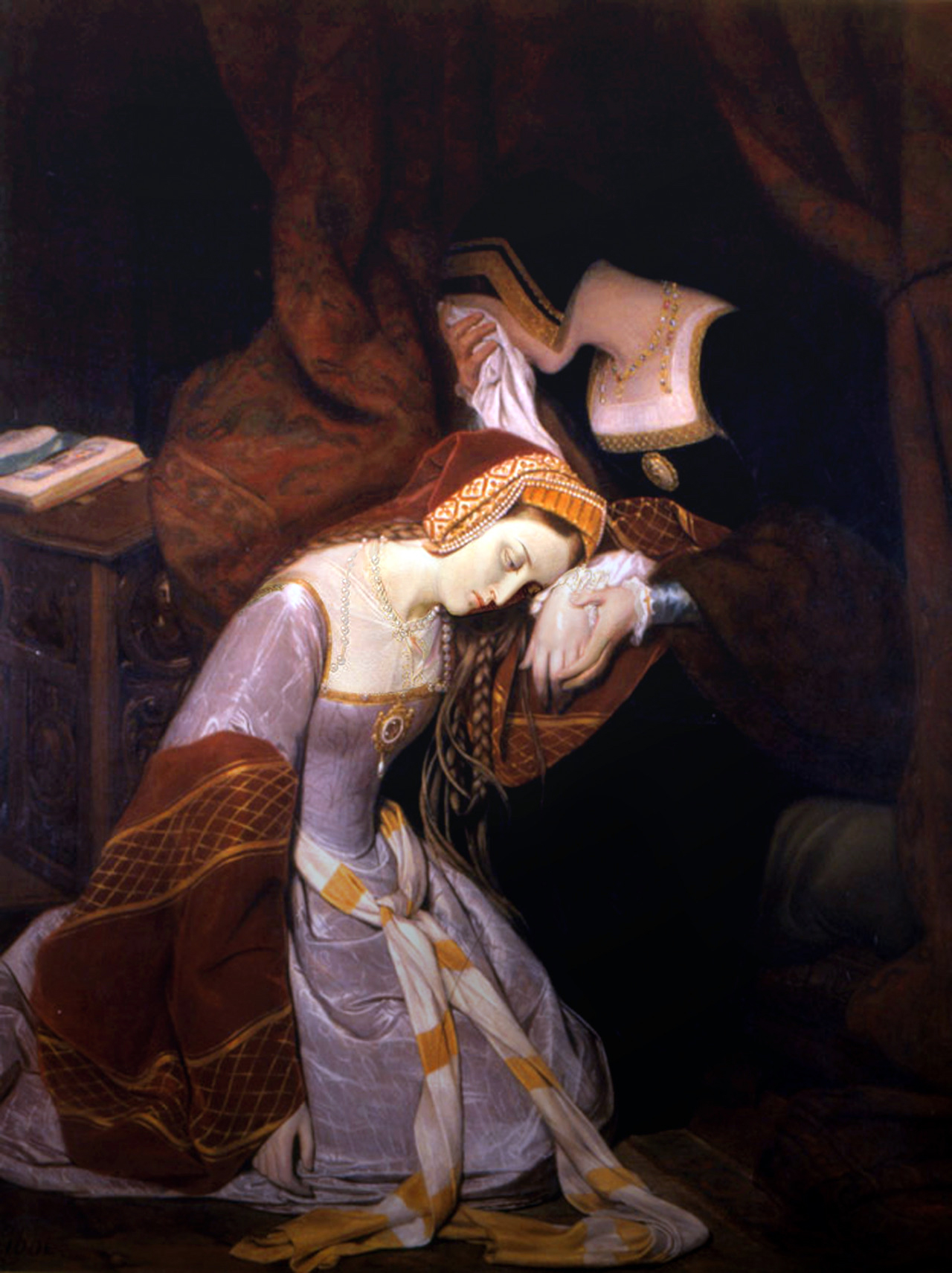
Anne Boleyn in the Tower by Édouard Cibot (1799–1877)

The accused were found guilty and condemned to death. George Boleyn and the other accused men were executed on 17 May 1536. William Kingston, the Constable of the Tower, reported that Anne seemed very happy and ready to be done with life. Henry commuted Anne's sentence from burning to beheading, and rather than have a queen beheaded with the common axe, he brought an expert swordsman from Saint-Omer in France to perform the execution.

An anonymous manuscript of a poem "O Death Rock Me Asleep" that came into the possession of prolific 18th-century author John Hawkins, and now in the British Museum, was thought to be in the style of "the time of Henry VIII". On this weak premise, Hawkins conjectured that the writer was "very probabl[y]" Anne Boleyn, writing after her conviction. Defiled is my Name, a similar lament, is also attributed to Anne. According to Ives, she could not have produced any such writings while under the scrutiny of the ladies set to watch over her in the Tower. Mary Joiner of the Royal Musical Association examined the BM documents and concluded that the attributions, although held in wide belief, are no more than an "improbable ... legend".

On the morning of 19 May, Kingston wrote:

This morning she sent for me, that I might be with her at such time as she received the good Lord, to the intent I should hear her speak as touching her innocency alway to be clear. And in the writing of this she sent for me, and at my coming she said, "Mr. Kingston, I hear I shall not die afore noon, and I am very sorry therefore, for I thought to be dead by this time and past my pain." I told her it should be no pain, it was so little. And then she said, "I heard say the executioner was very good, and I have a little neck," and then put her hands about it, laughing heartily. I have seen many men and also women executed, and that they have been in great sorrow, and to my knowledge this lady has much joy in death. Sir, her almoner is continually with her, and had been since two o'clock after midnight.

Shortly before dawn, she called Kingston to hear mass with her and swore in his presence, on the eternal salvation of her soul and upon the Holy Sacraments, that she had never been unfaithful to the King. She ritually repeated this oath immediately before and after receiving the sacrament of the Eucharist.

On the morning of Friday 19 May, Anne was taken to a scaffold erected on the north side of the White Tower. She wore a red petticoat under a loose, dark grey gown of damask trimmed in fur, and a mantle of ermine. Accompanied by two female attendants, Anne made her final walk from the Queen's House to the scaffold; she showed a "devilish spirit" and looked "as gay as if she was not going to die". She climbed the scaffold and made a short speech to the crowd:

Good Christian people, […] I am come hither to die, for according to the law, and by the law I am judged to die, and therefore I will speak nothing against it. I am come hither to accuse no man, nor to speak anything of that, whereof I am accused and condemned to die, but I pray God save the king and send him long to reign over you, for a gentler nor a more merciful prince was there never: and to me he was ever a good, a gentle and sovereign lord. And if any person will meddle of my cause, I require them to judge the best. And thus I take my leave of the world and of you all, and I heartily desire you all to pray for me. O Lord have mercy on me, to God I commend my soul.

This version of her speech is found in John Foxe's Actes and Monuments (also known as Foxe's Book of Martyrs).

Lancelot de Carle, a secretary to the French Ambassador, Antoine de Castelnau, was in London in May 1536, and was an eyewitness to her trial and execution. Two weeks after Anne's death, de Carle composed the 1,318-line poem Épistre Contenant le Procès Criminel Faict à l'Encontre de la Royne Anne Boullant d'Angleterre (A Letter Containing the Criminal Charges Laid Against Queen Anne Boleyn of England), which provides a moving account of her last words and their effect on the crowd:

She gracefully addressed the people from the scaffold with a voice somewhat overcome by weakness, but which gathered strength as she went on. She begged her hearers to forgive her if she had not used them all with becoming gentleness, and asked for their prayers. It was needless, she said, to relate why she was there, but she prayed the Judge of all the world to have compassion on those who had condemned her, and she begged them to pray for the King, in whom she had always found great kindness, fear of God, and love of his subjects. The spectators could not refrain from tears.

It is thought that Anne avoided criticising Henry because she wished to save Elizabeth and her family from further consequences, but even under such extreme pressure, she did not confess guilt and indeed subtly implied her innocence in her appeal to those who might "meddle of my cause".

=== Death and burial ===
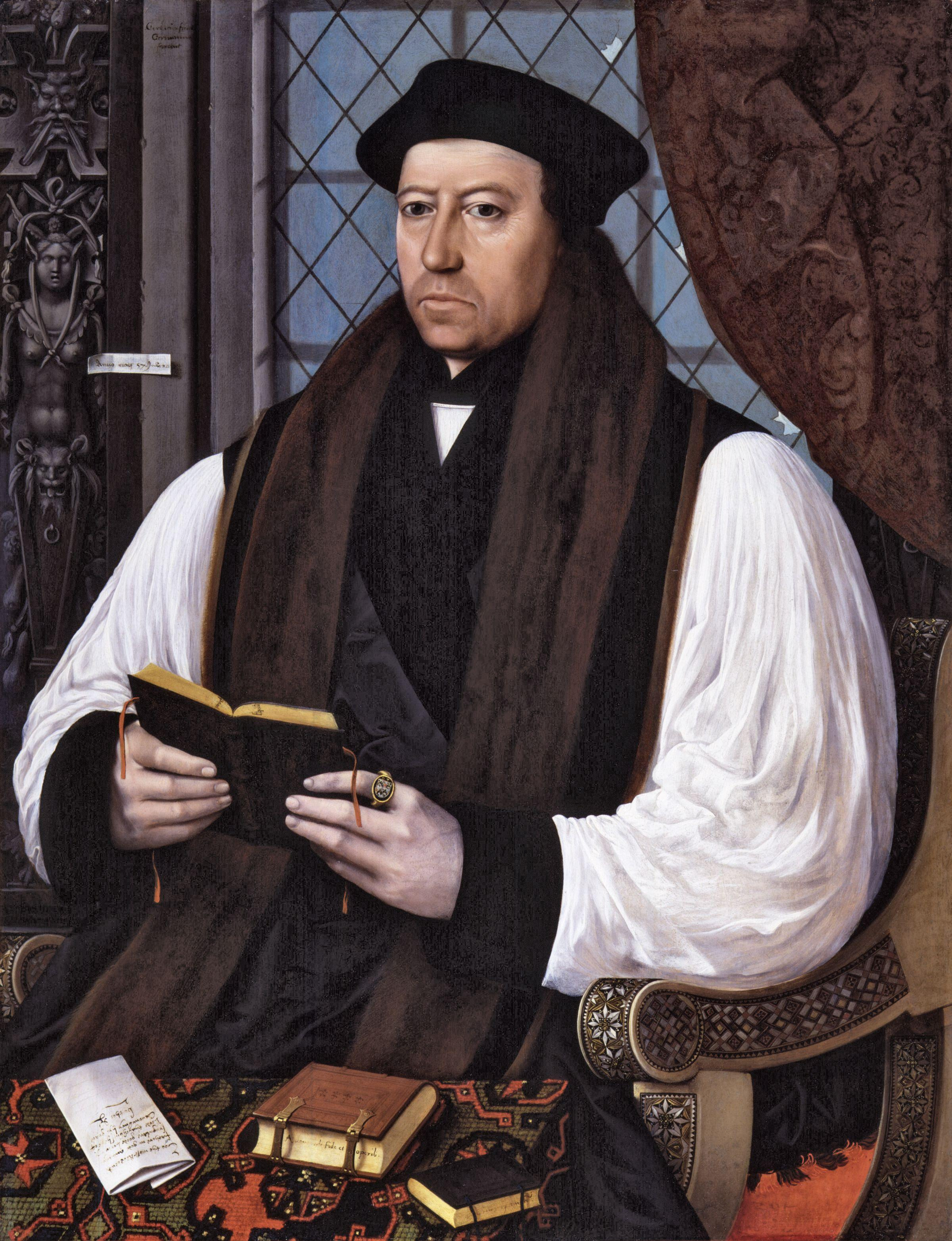
Thomas Cranmer, Anne's sole supporter in the council

The ermine mantle was removed, and Anne lifted off her headdress and tucked her hair under a coif. After a brief farewell to her weeping ladies and a request for prayers, she knelt down; one of the ladies tied a blindfold over Anne's eyes. She knelt upright, in the French style of beheadings. Her final prayer consisted of her continually repeating, "Jesu receive my soul; O Lord God have pity on my soul."

The execution, which consisted of a single stroke, was witnessed by Thomas Cromwell; Charles Brandon, 1st Duke of Suffolk; the King's illegitimate son, Henry FitzRoy; and Sir Ralph Warren, Lord Mayor of London, as well as aldermen, sheriffs and representatives of the various craft guilds. Most of the King's Council was also present. Cranmer, who was at Lambeth Palace, reportedly broke down in tears after telling Alexander Ales, "She who has been the Queen of England on earth will today become a Queen in heaven." When the charges were first brought against Anne, Cranmer had expressed his astonishment to Henry and his belief that "she should not be culpable".

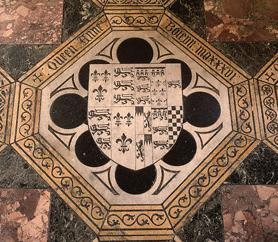
Anne Boleyn's grave marker

Cranmer felt vulnerable because of his closeness to the Queen; on the night before the execution, he declared Henry's marriage to Anne to have been void, like Catherine's before her. He made no serious attempt to save Anne's life, although some sources record that he had prepared her for death by hearing her last private confession of sins, in which she had stated her innocence before God.

She was buried in an unmarked grave in the Chapel of St Peter ad Vincula at the Tower of London. Her skeleton was identified during renovations of the chapel in 1876, in the reign of Queen Victoria, and reinterred there in 1877. Her grave is now clearly marked on the marble floor, although the historian Alison Weir believes that the bones identified as belonging to Anne might in fact be those of Catherine Howard.

== Recognition and legacy ==
Nicholas Sanders, a Catholic recusant born c. 1530, was committed to deposing Elizabeth I and re-establishing Catholicism in England. In his De Origine ac Progressu schismatis Anglicani (The Rise and Growth of the Anglican Schism), published in 1585, he was the first to write that Anne had six fingers on her right hand. Since physical deformities were generally interpreted as a sign of evil, it is unlikely that Anne Boleyn would have gained Henry's romantic attention had she had any. Upon exhumation in 1876, no abnormalities were discovered. Her frame was described as delicate, approximately 5 feet 3 inches (1.60 m), "the hand and feet bones indicated delicate and well-shaped hands and feet, with tapering fingers and a narrow foot".

Anne Boleyn was described by contemporaries as intelligent and gifted in musical arts and scholarly pursuits. She was also strong-willed and proud, and often quarrelled with Henry. Biographer Eric Ives evaluates the apparent contradictions in Anne's persona:

To us she appears inconsistent—religious yet aggressive, calculating yet emotional, with the light touch of the courtier yet the strong grip of the politician—but is this what she was, or merely what we strain to see through the opacity of the evidence? As for her inner life, short of a miraculous cache of new material, we shall never really know. Yet what does come to us across the centuries is the impression of a person who is strangely appealing to the early 21st century: A woman in her own right—taken on her own terms in a man's world; a woman who mobilised her education, her style and her presence to outweigh the disadvantages of her sex; of only moderate good looks, but taking a court and a king by storm. Perhaps, in the end, it is Thomas Cromwell's assessment that comes nearest: intelligence, spirit and courage.

Following the coronation of her daughter as queen, Anne was venerated as a martyr and heroine of the English Reformation, particularly through the works of John Foxe, who argued that Anne had saved England from the evils of Catholicism and that God had provided proof of her innocence and virtue by making sure her daughter Elizabeth I ascended the throne. An example of Anne's direct influence in the reformed church is what Alexander Ales described to Queen Elizabeth as the "evangelical bishops whom your holy mother appointed from among those scholars who favoured the purer doctrine". Over the centuries, Anne has inspired or been mentioned in numerous artistic and cultural works. As a result, she has remained in the popular memory and has been called "the most influential and important queen consort England has ever had."

== Appearance and portraits ==
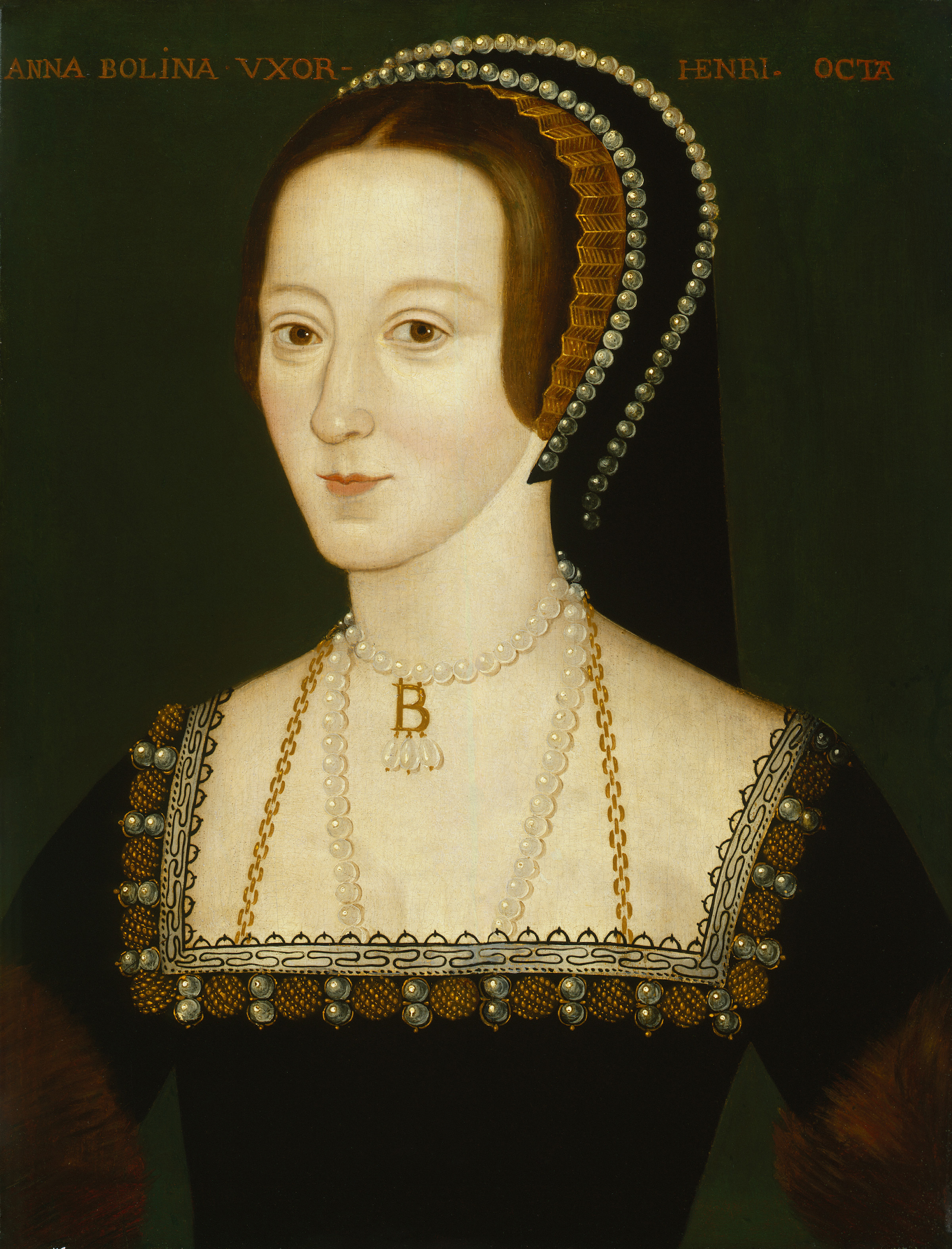
Copy from a lost original at National Portrait Gallery, London

Anne's appearance has been much discussed by historians, as all of her portraits were destroyed following an order by Henry VIII, who wanted to erase her from history. Many surviving depictions of her may be copies of a lost original that apparently existed as late as 1773. One of the few contemporary likenesses of Anne was captured on a medal referred to as "The Moost Happi Medal" which was struck in 1536, probably to celebrate her pregnancy which occurred around that time. The other possible portrait of Anne is the Chequers Ring, a secret locket ring that her daughter Elizabeth I possessed and was taken from one of her fingers at her death in 1603.

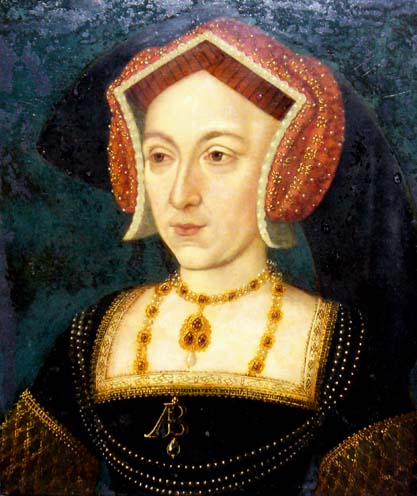
Nidd Hall Portrait called 'Anne Boleyn'. Similar to only known contemporary image of Anne on a Medal.

Another portrait of Anne was discovered in 2015 painted by artist Nidd Hall. Some scholars believe that it portrays Anne because it resembles the 1536 medal more than any other depiction. However, others believe that it is actually a portrait of her successor Jane Seymour.

=== Holbein sketches ===
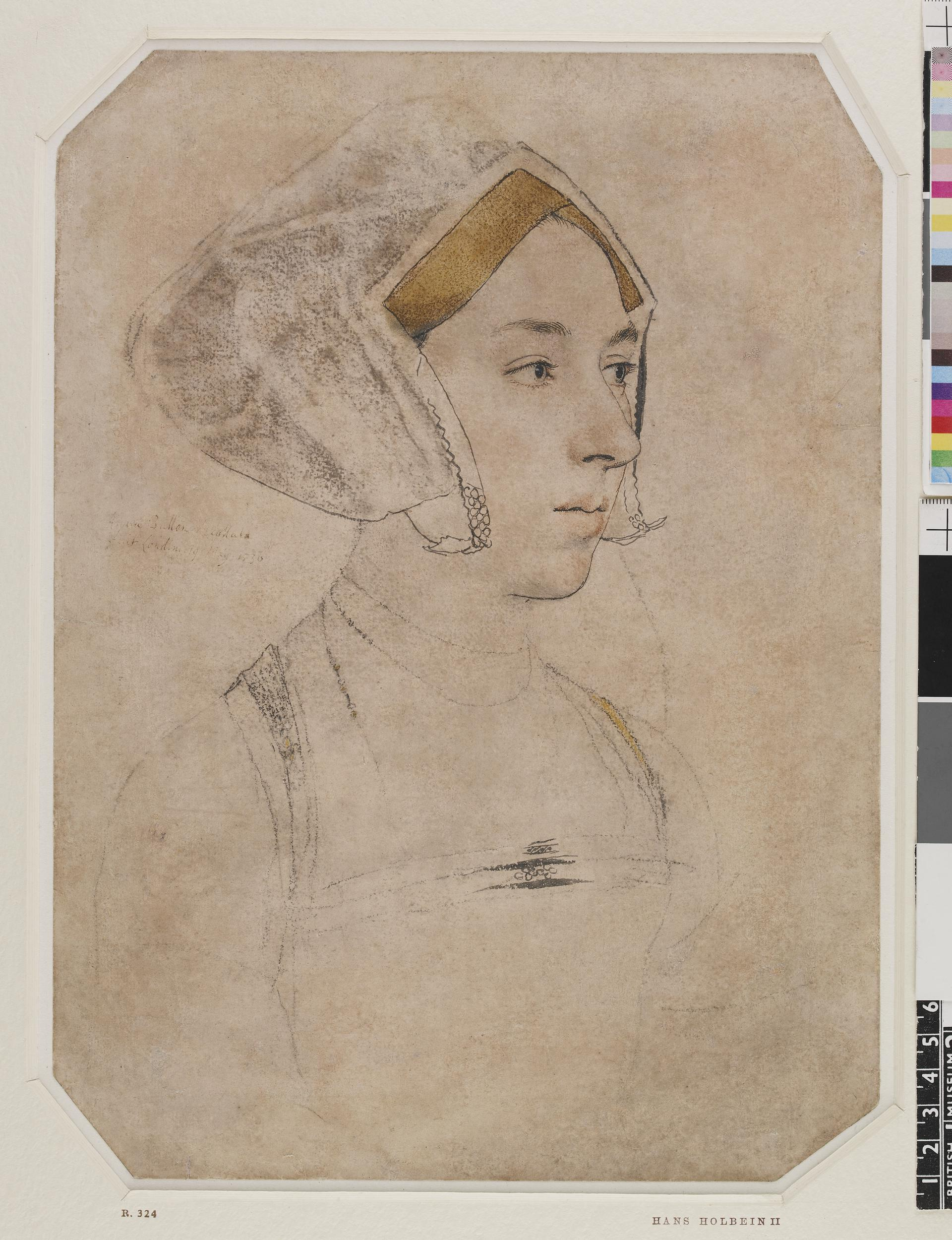
A sketch by Hans Holbein the Younger, depicting Anne Boleyn

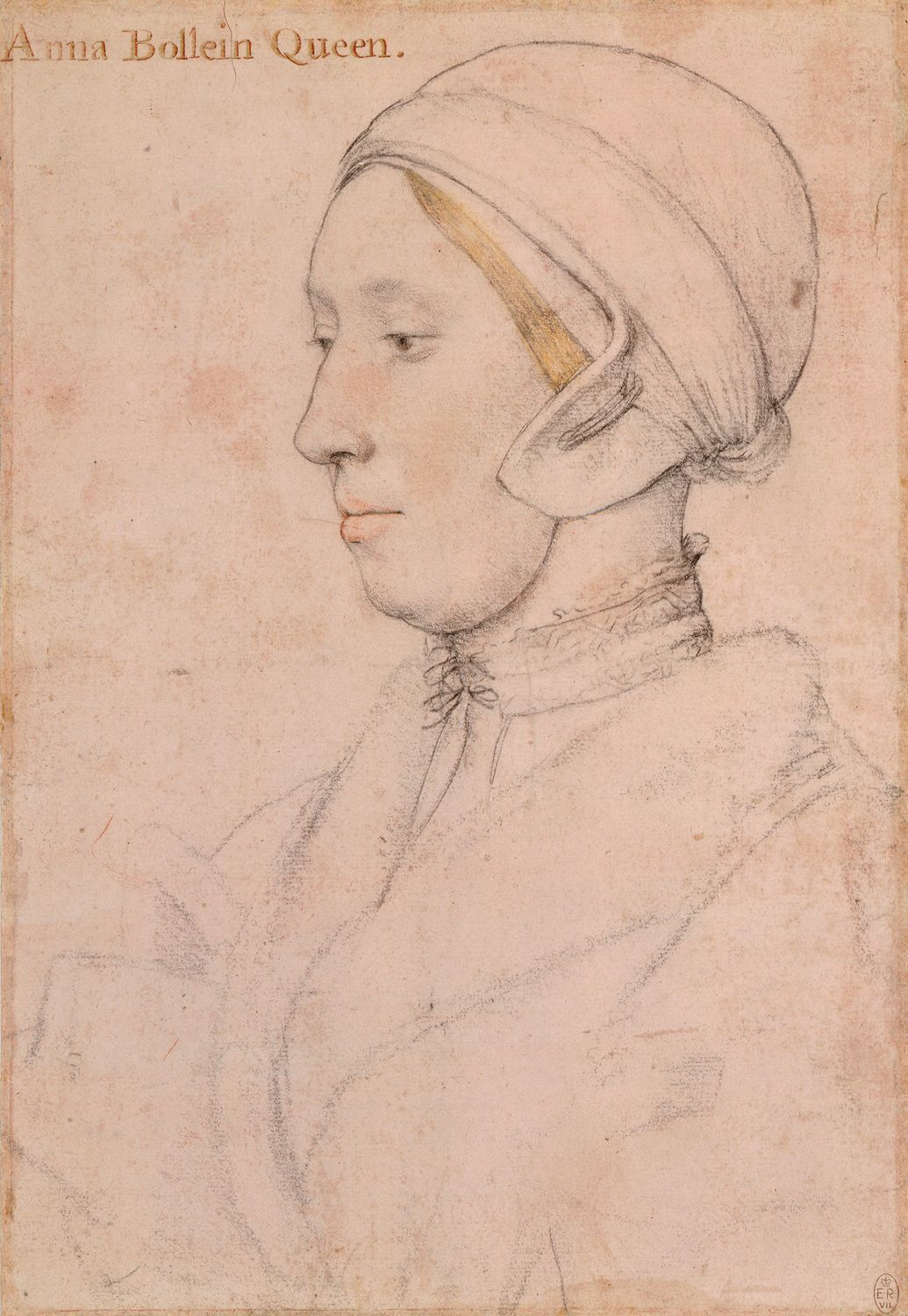
Sketch headed with Anne's name

Hans Holbein the Younger originally painted Anne's portrait and also sketched her during her lifetime. There are two surviving sketches that have been identified to be of Anne, by historians and people who knew her. Most scholars believe that Anne cannot be one of the two, as the portrayals do not look similar to each other, whilst others think that they do show the same woman but in one sketch she is pregnant, whilst in the other she is not.

She was considered brilliant, charming, driven, elegant, forthright and graceful, with a keen wit and a lively, opinionated and passionate personality. Anne was depicted as "sweet and cheerful" in her youth and enjoyed cards and dice games, drinking wine, French cuisine, flirting, gambling, gossiping and good jokes. She was fond of archery, falconry, hunting and the occasional game of bowls. She also had a sharp tongue and a terrible temper.

Anne exerted a powerful charm on those who met her, though opinions differed on her attractiveness. The Venetian diarist Marino Sanuto the Younger, who saw Anne when Henry VIII met Francis I at Calais in October 1532, described her as "not one of the handsomest women in the world; she is of middling stature, swarthy complexion, long neck, wide mouth, bosom not much raised ... eyes, which are black and beautiful". Simon Grynée wrote to Martin Bucer in September 1531 that Anne was "young, good-looking, of a rather dark complexion". Lancelot de Carle called her "beautiful with an elegant figure", and a Venetian in Paris in 1528 also reported that she was said to be beautiful.

The most influential description of Anne, but also the least reliable, was written by the Catholic propagandist and polemicist Nicholas Sanders in 1586, half a century after Anne's death:

Anne Boleyn was rather tall of stature, with black hair, and an oval face of a sallow complexion, as if troubled with jaundice. It is said she had a projecting tooth under the upper lip, and on her right hand six fingers. There was a large wen under her chin, and therefore to hide its ugliness she wore a high dress covering her throat ... She was handsome to look at, with a pretty mouth.

As Sander held Anne responsible for Henry VIII's rejection of the Catholic Church he was keen to demonise her. Sanders description contributed to what Ives calls the "monster legend" of Anne Boleyn. Though his details were fictitious, they have formed the basis for references to Anne's appearance even in some modern textbooks.

== Faith and spirituality ==
Because of Anne's early exposure to court life, she had powerful influences around her for most of her life. These early influences were mostly women who were engaged with art, history and religion. Eric Ives described the women around Anne as "aristocratic women seeking spiritual fulfillment". They included Queen Claude, of whose court Anne was a member, and Marguerite of Angoulême, who was a well-known figure during the Renaissance and held strong religious views that she expressed through poetry. These women along with Anne's immediate family members, such as her father, may have had a large influence on Anne's personal faith.

Anne's experience in France made her a devout Christian in the new tradition of Renaissance humanism. Anne knew little Latin and, trained at a French court, she was influenced by an "evangelical variety of French humanism", which led her to champion the vernacular Bible. Due to her Christian faith, she expected her council, among other things, to be both honest and modest, that they should wholly embrace faith in God, and that they would not associate with vice of any sort. She later held the reformist position that the papacy was a corrupting influence on Christianity, but her conservative tendencies could be seen in her devotion to the Virgin Mary. Anne's European education ended in 1521, when her father summoned her back to England. She sailed from Calais in January 1522.

Another clue to Anne's personal faith could be found in Anne's book of hours, in which she wrote, "le temps viendra" ["the time will come"]. Alongside this inscription, she drew an armillary sphere, an emblem (also used by her daughter Elizabeth) representing contemplation of heavenly wisdom.

Anne Boleyn's last words before her beheading were a prayer for her salvation, her king, and her country. She said, "Good Christian people! I am come hither to die, for according to the law, and by the law, I am judged to death; and therefore I will speak nothing against it. I come hither to accuse no man, nor to any thing of that whereof I am accused and condemned to die; but I pray God save the king, and send him long to reign over you, for a gentler, or a more merciful prince was there never; and to me he was ever a good, a gentle, and a sovereign lord." John Foxe, martyrologist, included Anne in his book, Actes and Monuments, claiming she was a good woman who had sincere faith and trust in her God. Foxe also believed a sign of Anne's good faith was God's blessing on her daughter, Elizabeth I, and God allowing Elizabeth to prosper as queen.

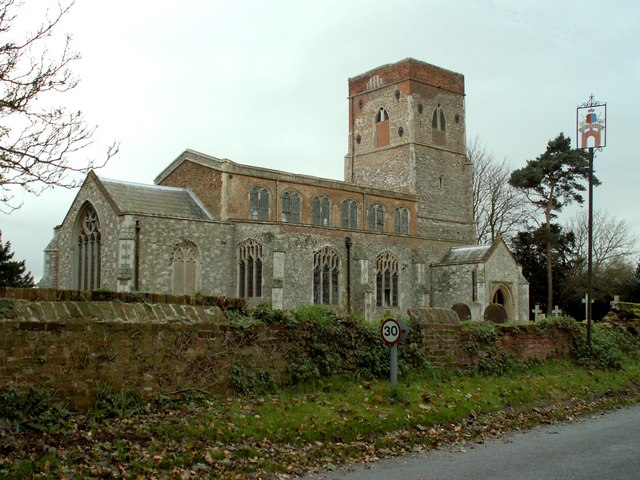
St Mary's Church, Erwarton, Suffolk, where Boleyn's heart was allegedly buried

== Legends ==
Many legends and stories about Anne Boleyn have existed over the centuries. One is that she was secretly buried in Salle Church in Norfolk under a black slab near the tombs of her ancestors. Her body was said to have rested in an Essex church on its journey to Norfolk. Another is that her heart, at her request, was buried in Erwarton (Arwarton) Church, Suffolk by her uncle Sir Philip Parker.

In 18th-century Sicily, the peasants of the village of Nicolosi believed that Anne Boleyn, for having made Henry VIII a heretic, was condemned to burn for eternity inside Mount Etna. This legend was often told for the benefit of foreign travellers.

A number of people have claimed to have seen Anne's ghost at Hever Castle, Blickling Hall, Salle Church, the Tower of London and Marwell Hall. One account of her reputed sighting was given by paranormal researcher Hans Holzer. In 1864, Captain (later Major General) J. D. Dundas of the 60th Rifles regiment was billeted in the Tower of London. As he was looking out the window of his quarters, he noticed a guard below in the courtyard, in front of the lodgings where Anne had been imprisoned, behaving strangely. He appeared to challenge something, which to Dundas "looked like a whitish, female figure sliding towards the soldier". The guard charged through the form with his bayonet, then fainted. Only the captain's testimony and corroboration at the court-martial saved the guard from a lengthy prison sentence for having fainted while on duty.

== Issue ==
Name	Birth	Death	Notes
Elizabeth I	7 September 1533	24 March 1603	Never married, no issue
Miscarriage or false pregnancy	Summer 1534		
Possible miscarriage	1535		
Miscarried son	29 January 1536		

== See also ==
- Bring Up the Bodies, a book by Hilary Mantel (2012)
- Anna Bolena, an opera by Gaetano Donizetti with lyrics by Felice Romani (1830)
- Anne of the Thousand Days, a 1969 film distributed by Universal Pictures based on the stage play by Maxwell Anderson
- "With Her Head Tucked Underneath Her Arm", a darkly humorous song about Anne's ghost
- The Other Boleyn Girl, a book by Philippa Gregory later adapted into a 2008 film which has Mary's sister Anne as one of the main characters. An earlier television adaptation of the book was made by the BBC in 2003.

== Bibliography ==
- Ashley, Mike (2002). British Kings & Queens. Running Press. ISBN 0-7867-1104-3.
- Baumann, Uwe, ed. Henry VIII in history, historiography, and literature (Peter Lang, 1992).
- Bell, Doyne C. Notices of the Historic Persons Buried in the Chapel of St. Peter ad Vincula in the Tower of London (1877)
- Bernard, G. W. (2011). Anne Boleyn: Fatal Attractions. New Haven; London: Yale University Press. ISBN 978-0-300-17089-4.
- —— "The fall of Anne Boleyn", English Historical Review, 106 (1991), 584–610 in JSTOR
- Bordo, Susan (2014). The Creation of Anne Boleyn A New Look at England's Most Notorious Queen. London: Oneworld Publications. ISBN 978-1780743653.
- Borman, Tracy (2016). The Private Lives of the Tudors. London: Hodder and Stoughton. ISBN 978-1444782912.
- —— (2023). Anne Boleyn & Elizabeth I: the mother and daughter who changed history. London: Hodder & Stoughton. ISBN 978-1399705097.
- Brigden, Susan (2000). New Worlds, Lost Worlds: The Rule of the Tudors, 1485–1603. Allen Lane. ISBN 978-0713990676.
- de Carle, Lancelot (1545). Epistre Contenant le Procès Criminel Faict a l'Encontre de la Royne Anne Boullant d'Angleterre. Lyon.
- Cavendish, George (1641). Singer, Samuel (ed.). The Life of Cardinal Wolsey. London: Harding Triphook and Lepard (published 1825). OCLC 457354116.
- Dewhurst, John (January 1984). "The alleged miscarriages of Catherine of Aragon and Anne Boleyn". Medical History. 28 (1): 49–56. doi:10.1017/S0025727300035316. PMC 1139382.
- Dowling, Maria (June 1991). "A Woman's Place? Learning and the Wives of King Henry VII". History Today. Vol. 41, no. 6.
- —— (1986). Humanism in the Age of Henry the VIII. Croom Helm. ISBN 0709908644.
- Elton, G. R. (1977). Reform and Reformation. London: Edward Arnold. ISBN 0-7131-5953-7.
- Foxe, John (1838). Cattley, S. R. (ed.). The Acts and Monuments of John Foxe. Vol. V.
- Fraser, Antonia (1992). The Wives of Henry VIII. New York: Knopf. ISBN 0-679-73001-X.
- Graves, Michael (2003). Henry VIII. London: Pearson Longman. ISBN 0-582-38110-X.
- Guy, John (1 November 2009). "The Lady in the Tower: The Fall of Anne Boleyn by Alison Weir". The Sunday Times. London. Archived from the original on 19 December 2013.
- Haigh, Christopher (1993). English Reformations: Religion, Politics, and Society under the Tudors. Clarendon Press. ISBN 978-0198221623.
- Hibbert, Christopher (1971). Tower of London: A History of England From the Norman Conquest. Newsweek. ISBN 978-0882250021.
- Ives, E. W. (1994). "Ann Boleyn and the early reformation in England: the contemporary evidence". The Historical Journal. 37 (2): 389–400. doi:10.1017/S0018246X00016526. S2CID 162289756.
- —— (2004). The Life and Death of Anne Boleyn: The Most Happy. Oxford: Blackwell Publishing. ISBN 978-0-631-23479-1.
- —— "Anne (c. 1500–1536)", Oxford Dictionary of National Biography, (2004b) accessed 8 September 2011
- Lacey, Robert (1972). The Life and Times of Henry VIII. ASIN B000KL8N6W.
- Lehmberg, Stanford E. The Reformation Parliament, 1529–1536 (1970)
- "Letters and Papers, Foreign and Domestic, Henry VIII". British-history.ac.uk.
- Lindsey, Karen Divorced Beheaded Survived: A Feminist Reinterpretation of the Wives of Henry VIII (1995) ISBN 0-201-40823-6
- Lipscomb, Suzannah (2009). 1536: the year that changed Henry VIII. Oxford: Lion Books. ISBN 978-0-8254-7938-0.
- Lofts, Norah (1979). Anne Boleyn. Coward, McCann & Geoghegan. ISBN 978-0698110052.
- MacCulloch, Diarmaid (1996). Thomas Cranmer: A Life. New Haven: Yale University Press. ISBN 0-300-07448-4.
- —— (2018). Thomas Cromwell: A Life. Penguin. ISBN 978-1846144295.
- Morris, T. A. (1998). Europe and England in the Sixteenth Century. London: Routledge. doi:10.4324/9780203014639. ISBN 978-0203014639.
- Norton, Elizabeth (2009). Anne Boleyn: Henry VIII's Obsession. Amberley. ISBN 978-1-84868-084-5.
- Parker, K. T. The Drawings of Hans Holbein at Windsor Castle Oxford: Phaidon (1945), OCLC 822974
- Porter, Linda R. (2007). Mary Tudor: the first queen (2009 ed.). London: Piatkus. ISBN 9780749909826.
- Rowlands, John The Age of Dürer and Holbein London: British Museum (1988) ISBN 0-7141-1639-4
- Roy, Neha (2023). Henry VIII's Imprisoned Women: The Women of the Tower. Barnsley, England: Pen & Sword Books Limited. ISBN 978-1-39909-576-1.
- Scarisbrick, J. J. (1972). Henry VIII. Berkeley and Los Angeles: University of California Press. ISBN 978-0-520-01130-4.
- Schmid, Susan Walters (2013) [2009]. "Chapter 3: The Poem: Poem Translation". Anne Boleyn, Lancelot de Carle, and the Uses of Documentary Evidence (PhD thesis). Ann Arbor: Arizona State University. pp. 110–175. Archived from the original on 19 December 2013.
- —— (March 2011). "Anne Boleyn and Henry VIII". History Review. 69: 7–11. Archived from the original on 14 August 2014.
- Schofield, John (2008). The rise and fall of Thomas Cromwell: Henry VIII's most faithful servant. Stroud: History Press. ISBN 978-0-7524-4604-2.
- Somerset, Anne (1997). Elizabeth I. London: Phoenix. ISBN 0-385-72157-9.
- Starkey, David (1985). The reign of Henry VIII: personalities and politics. London: George Philip. ISBN 0-540-01093-6.
- —— (2003). Six Wives: The Queens of Henry VIII. HarperCollins. ISBN 0-06-000550-5.
- Strong, Roy (1969). Tudor & Jacobean Portraits. London: HMSO. OCLC 71370718.
- Walker, Greg. "Rethinking the Fall of Anne Boleyn", Historical Journal, March 2002, Vol. 45 Issue 1, pp 1–29; blames what she said in incautious conversations with the men who were executed with her
- Warnicke, Retha M. "The Fall of Anne Boleyn: A Reassessment", History, Feb 1985, Vol. 70 Issue 228, pp 1–15; stresses role of Sir Thomas Cromwell, the ultimate winner
- —— (Winter 1986). "The Eternal Triangle and Court Politics: Henry VIII, Anne Boleyn, and Sir Thomas Wyatt". Albion: A Quarterly Journal Concerned with British Studies. 18 (4): 565–579. doi:10.2307/4050130. JSTOR 4050130.
- —— (1989). The Rise and Fall of Anne Boleyn: Family Politics at the Court of Henry VIII. New York: Cambridge University Press. ISBN 978-0521370004.
- ——. Sexual heresy at the court of Henry VIII. Historical Journal 30.2 (1987): 247–268.
- Weir, Alison (1991). The Six Wives of Henry VIII. Grove Press. ISBN 978-0-8021-3683-1.
- —— (2001). Henry VIII: The King and His Court. Ballantine Books. ISBN 0345436598.
- —— (2010). The Lady in the Tower: The Fall of Anne Boleyn. London: Vintage. ISBN 978-0-7126-4017-6.
- —— (2011). Mary Boleyn The Mistress of Kings. Ballantine. ISBN 978-0771089220.
- Williams, Neville (1971). Henry VIII and His Court. Weidenfeld and Nicolson. ISBN 0297003690.
- Wilson, Derek Hans Holbein: Portrait of an Unknown Man London: Pimlico, Revised Edition (2006) ISBN 978-1-84413-918-7
- Wooding, Lucy (2009). Henry VIII. London: Routledge. ISBN 978-0-415-33995-7.

English royalty
Vacant Title last held by Catherine of Aragon	Queen consort of England; Lady of Ireland; 28 May 1533 – 17 May 1536	Vacant Title next held by Jane Seymour
