= Francis Weston =

English gentleman condemned to death by Henry VIII (1511–1536)

Sir Francis Weston
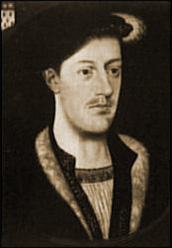
- Portrait believed to be of Sir Francis Weston, by unknown artist (Note: The escutcheon in the top left corner shows the Weston arms: Ermine, on a chief azure 5 bezants and the canvas bears the inscription "Weston Esq. of Sutton, Surrey". Collection of Parham Park, Sussex)
- Born: c. 1511
- Died: 17 May 1536 (aged 24–25); Tower Hill, London
- Cause of death: Execution by Beheading
- Resting place: Tower of London, London, England; 51.508611°N 0.076944°W
- Occupation: Gentleman of the Privy Chamber to Henry VIII
- Spouse: Anne Pickering
- Children: Henry Weston
- Parent(s): Sir Richard Weston; Anne Sandys
- Relatives: Sir William Weston

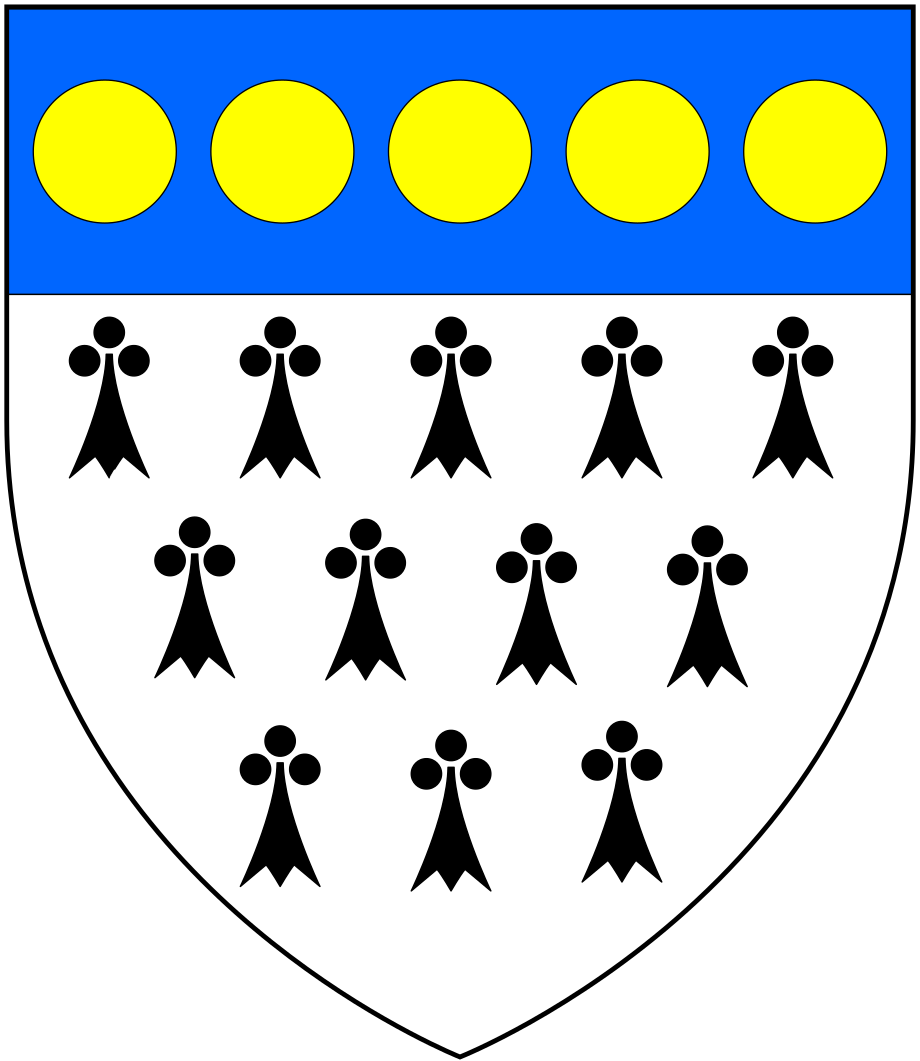
Arms of Weston: Ermine, on a chief azure five bezants

Sir Francis Weston (1511 – 17 May 1536) was a gentleman of the Privy Chamber at the court of King Henry VIII of England. He became a friend of the king but was later accused of high treason and adultery with Anne Boleyn, the king's second wife. Weston was condemned to death, together with George Boleyn, Viscount Rochford, Henry Norris, William Brereton and Mark Smeaton. They were all executed on 17 May 1536, two days before Anne Boleyn suffered a similar fate.

== Origins ==
He was the only son of Sir Richard Weston (1465–1541) of Ufton Court in Berkshire and Sutton Place in Surrey, a prominent courtier and diplomat who served under King Henry VIII as Governor of Guernsey, Treasurer of Calais and Under-Treasurer of the Exchequer. His mother was Anne Sandys, a daughter of Oliver Sandys of Shere in the parish of Dorking in Surrey. His uncle was Sir William Weston (died 1540), the last Prior of the Order of St John in England, deemed Premier Baron of England. His ancestors had long held high office in the Knights Hospitallers.

== Career ==
In 1526, aged only fifteen, he was listed as a page at court. Although he was twenty years younger than the King, he quickly became a minor member of the King's circle, listed as beating Henry at bowls, tennis, dice, and other games. In 1532 he was made a Gentleman of the Privy Chamber, giving him close access to the King. Other honours followed, including becoming a Knight of the Bath at the coronation of Anne Boleyn in 1533.

== Marriage and children ==
In 1530, he married Anne Pickering, a daughter to Sir Christopher Pickering of Killington in Cumberland. An oak marriage chest with carved heads of Francis and Anne is preserved in Saffron Walden Museum in Essex. Following Francis's execution in 1536, Anne married Sir Henry Knyvet (1510–1547) of Charlton in Wiltshire, Master of the Jewel Office. By Anne, Francis had a son and a daughter:

- Henry Weston (born 1535), who at the age of six became heir to his grandfather Sir Richard Weston.
- Anne Weston, who married Francis Keilway.

== Arrest ==
Once arrested, Anne Boleyn was attended by four ladies, who had been instructed by the King's chief minister Thomas Cromwell to report on the Queen's actions. Anne told one of these ladies, Mistress Coffin, that she had reprimanded Weston for flirting with Madge Shelton, who was betrothed to his fellow courtier Henry Norris. When Anne had wondered aloud to Weston why Norris had not yet married Madge, Weston replied, "[Norris] came more to her [Anne's] chamber for her than for Madge." Ironically Weston was not arrested until a day or two after Anne. The first indication that he was involved in this was in a letter from Sir William Kingston to Cromwell, giving the details of Anne’s conversations after her arrest.

== Execution ==
Francis was executed at the age of twenty-five after being accused of committing adultery with Queen Anne Boleyn, treason, and plotting to kill the king. (Note: A schedule of the charges against all five accused men are in the Baga de Secretis, published in Wriothesley (1875), pp. 189–226) He denied the charges and protested his innocence, but without avail. In addition, the evidence supporting the accusations against him is dubious. His father is said to have offered all the family had in order to gain a pardon for his son. His family was backed by Lancelot de Carle, who wrote “no one dared plead for [Weston] except his mother, who, oppressed with grief, petitioned the King, and [Weston's] wife, who offered rents and goods for his deliverance”.

Francis was beheaded on Tower Hill on 17 May 1536 along with his co-accused, George Boleyn, Viscount Rochford; William Brereton; Henry Norris and Mark Smeaton.

== Bibliography ==
- Cavendish, George (1825). Singer, Samuel Weller (ed.). The Life of Cardinal Wolsey. Vol. I. London: Harding, Triphook, and Lepard.
- Clarke, Ernest (1899). "Weston, Francis". In Lee, Sidney (ed.). Dictionary of National Biography. Vol. 60. London: Smith, Elder & Co. pp. 360–361.
- Ford, David Nash (2010). "Sir Richard Weston (1465–1541)". David Nash Ford's Royal Berkshire History. Berkshirehistory.com.
- Friedmann, Paul (2014). Anne Boleyn. Chalford: Amberley. ISBN 9781445617619.
- Hughes, Jonathan (2004). "Weston, Sir Francis (1511–1536)". Oxford Dictionary of National Biography (online ed.). Oxford University Press. doi:10.1093/ref:odnb/29121. (Subscription, Wikipedia Library access or UK public library membership required.)
- Ives, Eric (2005). The Life and Death of Anne Boleyn: 'The Most Happy'. Oxford: Blackwell. ISBN 978-0-631-23479-1.
- Lindsey, Karen (1996). Divorced, Beheaded, Survived: A Feminist Reinterpretation of the Wives of Henry VIII (revised ed.). Cambridge: Perseus Books Group. ISBN 9780201408232.
- Ridgway, Claire (2012). The Fall of Anne Boleyn. MadeGlobal Publishing. ISBN 978-1475266122.
- Shaw, William A. (1906). The Knights of England. Vol. I. London: Sherrat and Hughes.
- Warnicke, Retha M. (1989). The Rise and Fall of Anne Boleyn: Family Politics at the Court of Henry VIII. Cambridge University Press. ISBN 9780521406772.
- Weir, Alison (2009). The Lady in the Tower: The Fall of Anne Boleyn. Jonathan Cape. ISBN 9780712640176.
- Wriothesley, Charles (1875). Hamilton, William Douglas (ed.). A Chronicle of England During the Reigns of the Tudors, From A.D. 1485 to 1559. Vol. I. Printed for the Camden Society.
