= William Brereton (courtier) =

Courtier to Henry VIII of England

- Born: c. 1487 - 1490, (or even 1501); Cheshire
- Died: 17 May 1536 (aged 48–49); Tower Hill, London
- Cause of death: Decapitation
- Resting place: Tower of London, London, United Kingdom; 51.508611°N 0.076944°W
- Occupation: Groom of the Privy Chamber to Henry VIII
- Spouse: Elizabeth Somerset (Lady Savage)
- Children: Henry; Thomas
- Parent(s): Sir Randle Brereton; Eleanor Dutton

William Brereton, c. 1487/1490 – 17 May 1536, was a member of a prominent Cheshire family who served as a courtier to Henry VIII. In May 1536, Brereton was accused of committing adultery with Anne Boleyn, the king's second wife, and executed for treason along with her brother George Boleyn, Henry Norris, Francis Weston and a musician, Mark Smeaton. Most historians are now of the opinion that Anne Boleyn, Brereton and their co-accused were innocent.

== Family and background ==
William's birth date is subject to conjecture. Often thought to be born circa 1487 - 1490, some records suggest he may have been born as late as 1501 (which makes sense in the context of the birth of his younger brother, Sir Urian Brereton, who was born circa 1505). He was the sixth or seventh son of Sir Randle Brereton of Ipstones, Shocklach, and Malpas, Knight Chamberlain of Chester, knight banneret and knight of the body of Henry VII. Sir Randle Brereton fought at the battles of Thérouanne and Tournai in France in a campaign headed by Henry VIII. William's mother was Eleanor Dutton.

== Marriage and issue ==
In 1530, Brereton married a second cousin of Henry VIII. She was Elizabeth, daughter of Charles Somerset, 1st Earl of Worcester and widow of Sir John Savage. Brereton and his wife had two sons:

- Henry Brereton
- Thomas Brereton

Elizabeth's first husband was the grandson of Sir John Savage, who had been a Lancastrian commander at the Battle of Bosworth in 1485. When the grandson had fallen into debt and was also being held in the Tower, all his lands were forfeited to the crown, and Brereton, as the king's man in Cheshire, was granted jurisdiction over them. After Sir John's death, Brereton's marriage to his widow established a family relationship with the king and thus cemented his position as a royal servant.

== Career ==
William's father settled an income on him in June 1508. The annuity, settled on lands in and around Malpas, was not large but it did give William the quasi-independence to be able to seek a gentleman's career in royal service. Along with three of his brothers, including Sir Urian Brereton, William entered royal service. By 1521 he was a groom of the king's chamber, and from 1524, groom of the privy chamber. This is confirmed in the 1526 Eltham Ordinances where Brereton appears as one of the four grooms of the privy chamber. This was a post that was an envied position at court and was of enormous importance politically.

In reward for his work for King Henry VIII, Brereton received a number of royal grants in Cheshire and the Welsh Marches. These eventually gave him an income of more than £10,000 a year - a staggering sum in those days and making him one of the wealthiest men at court. Brereton exercised his power on one occasion with a Flintshire gentleman, John ap Gryffith Eyton, whom he blamed for instigating the killing of one of his own retainers. The man was executed following a second trial after being previously acquitted. Historian Eric Ives writes of how Brereton was "the dominant royal servant in Cheshire and North Wales" due to his wealth, his royal grants, and his father's power in Cheshire. By the mid to late 1520s some of his positions included the Escheator of the county palatine, the post of sheriff of Merioneth and Flint, constable of Chester Castle, the stewardship of Longdendale, the position of sergeant of the peace and steward of the Lordship of Bromfield and Yale, the lordship of Chirk, ranger of Delamere Forest, keepership of Mersley Park, and steward and controller of Halton. When Henry finally separated from Catherine of Aragon, Brereton was made receiver-general in Cheshire and Flint to Catherine, in her new position as Dowager Princess of Wales.

William Brereton's pinnacle of achievement was undoubtedly around 1530 when he received the first of Henry VIII's gifts outside Cheshire and North Wales. In February, he was granted the manor of Finchley and also received the estate of the Abbey of Lesnes in Kent. It was also about this time that he got married. After his father's death in June that year, he was appointed Chamberlain of Chester. Later in the year he journeyed around the country to collect signatures from the “elite of England” for a petition asking the pope for an annulment of Henry's marriage to Catherine of Aragon. Brereton's position of trust with the king at this time is also shown by the fact that he accompanied the king on many hunting expeditions and the fact that he enjoyed a multitude of royal grants and crown offices - including overseeing the lands of Henry FitzRoy, Duke of Richmond and Somerset, Henry's son by Elizabeth Blount. In 1531, Henry VIII assigned Brereton to deliver jewels to Anne Boleyn and in January 1533, he was also one of a handful of witnesses at Henry's wedding to Anne Boleyn in the private chapel at Whitehall Palace. Later, in 1534, Brereton was sent to investigate alleged bribery and corruption at Valle Crucis Abbey in North Wales.

Brereton's position at court secured him grants and favours which built up his prestige and demonstrated his standing with the monarch. It guaranteed a steady stream of suppliants desirous "to be protected under the shadow of his wings", and it enhanced his reputation and following in the country at large. Eric Ives noted that due to his position and activities, William Brereton is one of the best documented men of his rank in the early Tudor period.

== Arrest, trial and execution ==
In May 1536, Anne Boleyn was accused of adultery with Mark Smeaton, a musician of the royal household, and courtiers Henry Norris, Francis Weston, and William Brereton as well as her brother, George Boleyn, Viscount Rochford, all of the privy chamber. The king's chief minister, Thomas Cromwell, "authorised and commissioned by the king," masterminded the proceedings against the queen and her co-accused. The allegation against Brereton, who had been arrested on 4 May, was that Anne solicited him on 16 November 1533, and misconduct took place on 27 November. Historian Eric Ives argues that Cromwell added Brereton to the plot against Anne to end his control of the Welsh Marches, and to reorganise (and centralise) the local government of Cheshire and the border area. There was never any indication he was a close or intimate associate of the queen but what apparently sealed his fate was political expediency.

The trials of Brereton, Norris, Weston, and Smeaton took place at Westminster Hall on 12 May. For their trial, they were escorted by barge from the Tower of London to Westminster by William Kingston, Constable of the Tower of London, where they were variously charged with high treason against the king, adultery with the queen, and plotting the king's death. The men would have only been told of the charges against them upon their arrival at Westminster Hall. With the exception of Smeaton, who was likely to have been tortured, they all pleaded not guilty to the charges. However, Thomas Cromwell ensured that a hostile jury was in place, consisting almost entirely of known enemies of the Boleyns, those who were religious conservatives who opposed Protestantism, those who were close to Cromwell or those who had much to gain by the execution of the defendants. Such men were not too difficult to find. The foreman of the jury, Edward Willoughby, owed Brereton a small fortune, a debt which would disappear if Brereton were to be found guilty. Given Brereton's wealth and position at court, many people owed him money including John Dudley, the future Duke of Northumberland and future father-in-law of Lady Jane Grey, who owed a notable debt of £200.

Regarding the jury, writer Alison Weir commented that “Given the affiliations of these men, and the unlikelihood that any of them would risk angering the king by returning the wrong verdict, the outcome of the trial was prejudiced from the very outset” and the defendants must have known that their fates were sealed as soon as they saw the members of the jury. Eustace Chapuys, the Imperial ambassador, claimed that Brereton was "...condemned on a presumption, not by proof or valid confession, and without any witnesses". Having been found guilty, the men were all sentenced to be hanged, drawn and quartered. The sentence was later commuted to beheading. The Brereton family made considerable efforts to save the life of their kinsman by offering substantial sums of money and forfeiture of houses and land to the crown. However, it is unlikely these offers were ever passed to the king. The queen and her brother were later tried separately on 15 May within the Tower.

Thomas Wyatt (poet) who had also been arrested, wrote of his abhorrence of the executions. Whilst incarcerated in the Tower, Wyatt wrote the following poem: Innocentia Veritas Viat Fides Circumdederunt me inimici mei. Wyatt knew all the protagonists involved and his lines "These bloody days have broken my heart....." show of his anguish that his friends and acquaintances, whom he considered innocent, were to be put to death.

On 17 May, William Brereton, George Boleyn, Viscount Rochford, Henry Norris, Sir Francis Weston and Mark Smeaton, were led from the Tower to a scaffold on Tower Hill. George Constantine, a cleric in service to Henry Norris and an eyewitness to their executions, recorded their last words. Brereton's words as he faced the executioner's axe, "The cause whereof I die, judge not. But if you judge, judge the best," may be interpreted as a cautious declaration of his innocence which would avoid the loss of his estates. The remains of all four executed men were initially buried in the churchyard of the Church of St Peter ad Vincula in the Tower of London but were later re-interred within the actual chapel itself.

Like George Boleyn, Henry Norris and Francis Weston, Brereton always maintained his innocence (at his trial, to individuals he spoke to as well as his final words on the scaffold). His friends and contemporaries at the time thought his innocence was beyond question. George Constantine said after his execution “yf any of them was innocent, it was he”. As historians now believe, he was probably collateral damage when Cromwell moved against the Boleyn faction and decided to get rid of him in the same coup in order to gain power and control in Cheshire and the Welsh Marches.

An indication of Brereton's wife's continued trust in her husband is provided by her bequest to her son nine years later: "one bracelet of gold, the which was the last token his father sent me." She died in 1545 always believing William was innocent.

== Portrayals in books and films ==
Academic books aside, the portrayals of Brereton have been mostly based on factual evidence in novels, dramas, and films with only one or two being entirely fictionalised.

Eric Ives, who produced a scholarly biography of the second wife of Henry VIII, did not actually start off researching Boleyn but was researching William Brereton as part of his work on early Tudor common law. He then realised that Brereton was one of the men executed in relation to Boleyn and his interest shifted to her after completing his 1976 book about Brereton's business and crown activities "Letters and Accounts of William Brereton of Malpas" as well as his 1983 book "The Common Lawyers of Pre-Reformation England".

Brereton appears in biographies of Anne Boleyn including the aforementioned seminal book about her life, "The Life and Death of Anne Boleyn: The Most Happy" by Eric Ives, as well as many other academic and historical books on Henry VIII and the early Tudor period. He has also appeared in a number of novels about Boleyn including ones by Norah Lofts and Margaret Campbell Barnes. In Evelyn Anthony's 1957 novel "Anne Boleyn", Brereton was depicted as being the jouster who unseated Henry VIII to such disastrous effect in January 1536 where the king lay unconscious for over two hours. Although Brereton was an accomplished jouster and some writers have suggested Henry was envious of his skills on horseback and in the lists, there's no suggestion that he was the jouster who unseated Henry in early 1536 nor that he was executed because of this.

In Wolf Hall, a 2015 TV mini-series adaptation of the historical novel by Hilary Mantel, William Brereton was played by Scottish actor Alastair Mackenzie.

In the 1969 film Anne of the Thousand Days Brereton was played by British actor Brook Williams.

His character appeared in the 1972 film Henry VIII and His Six Wives played by British actor, Mark York.

One entirely fictionalised and misleading portrayal of him was on the Showtime series, The Tudors, during season 2. Unlike previous depictions, both his character and life in this series were fabricated. George Boleyn was played by (Pádraic Delaney), Henry Norris by (Stephen Hogan), Mark Smeaton by (David Alpay) and Brereton was played by Canadian actor James Gilbert. In the TV drama he was portrayed as a young man, whilst in fact he may have been in his mid-forties. The show presented him as a dedicated Catholic and Jesuit, whereas in reality Brereton was married (which would have precluded him from being a cleric and therefore a Jesuit) and his religious leanings were towards the emerging Protestant cause. As an aside, the Jesuit order was founded in 1540 (four years after Brereton's execution). In the series, he is asked by the pope (Peter O'Toole) and ambassador Eustace Chapuys (Anthony Brophy) to get rid of Anne Boleyn (Natalie Dormer) to try and prevent King Henry VIII (Jonathan Rhys Meyers) from placing the English state on a collision course with the Catholic Church. However, in real life the Pope never asked Brereton or his peers to get rid of Anne Boleyn and there is no historical evidence of a papal plot to destroy Boleyn.

== Bibliography ==
- Amyot, T., ed. (1831). "Memorial from George Constantyne to Thomas Cromwell". Archaeologia. Vol. 23. London: Society of Antiquaries.
- "Calendar of State Papers, Spain". British-history.ac.uk.
- Glover, Robert; Fellows, William; Chaloner, Thomas (1882). Rylands, John Paul (ed.). The Visitation of Cheshire in the Year 1580, Made by Robert Glover, Somerset Herald, for William Flower, Norroy King of Arms : With Numerous Additions and Continuations, Including Those from the Visitation of Cheshire Made in the Year 1566 by the Same Herald : With an Appendix Containing the Visitation of a Part of Cheshire in the Year 1533, Made by William Fellows, Lancaster Herald, for Thomas Benolte, Clarenceux King of Arms : And a Fragment of the Visitation of the City of Chester in the Year 1591, Made by Thomas Chaloner, Deputy to the Office of Arms. Publications of the Harleian Society. Vol. XVIII. London: Harleian Society.
- Ives, E. W. (July 1992). "The Fall of Anne Boleyn Reconsidered". The English Historical Review. 107 (424): 651–664. doi:10.1093/ehr/cvii.ccccxxiv.651.in JSTOR
- Ives, E. W., ed. (1976). Letters and Accounts of William Brereton of Malpas. The Record Society of Lancashire and Cheshire. Vol. 116. Old Woking: Record Society of Lancashire and Cheshire.
- Ives, Eric (2005). The Life and Death of Anne Boleyn: 'The Most Happy'. Oxford: Blackwell Publishing. ISBN 978-1-4051-3463-7.
- Ives, E. W. (January 2008) [First published 2004]. "Brereton, William". Oxford Dictionary of National Biography (online ed.). Oxford University Press. doi:10.1093/ref:odnb/70865. (Subscription, Wikipedia Library access or UK public library membership required.)
- Lipscomb, Suzannah (April 2013). "Why Did Anne Boleyn Have to Die". BBC History Magazine. Vol. 14, no. 4. pp. 18–24.
- Ridgway, Claire (2012). The Fall of Anne Boleyn: A Countdown. MadeGlobal Publishing. ISBN 9781475266122.
- Wriothesley, Charles (1875). Hamilton, William Douglas (ed.). A Chronicle of England During the Reigns of the Tudors, From A.D. 1485 to 1559. Vol. I. Printed for the Camden Society.
