= George Boleyn, Viscount Rochford =

English nobleman and politician (c. 1504–1536)

George Boleyn
- Viscount Rochford
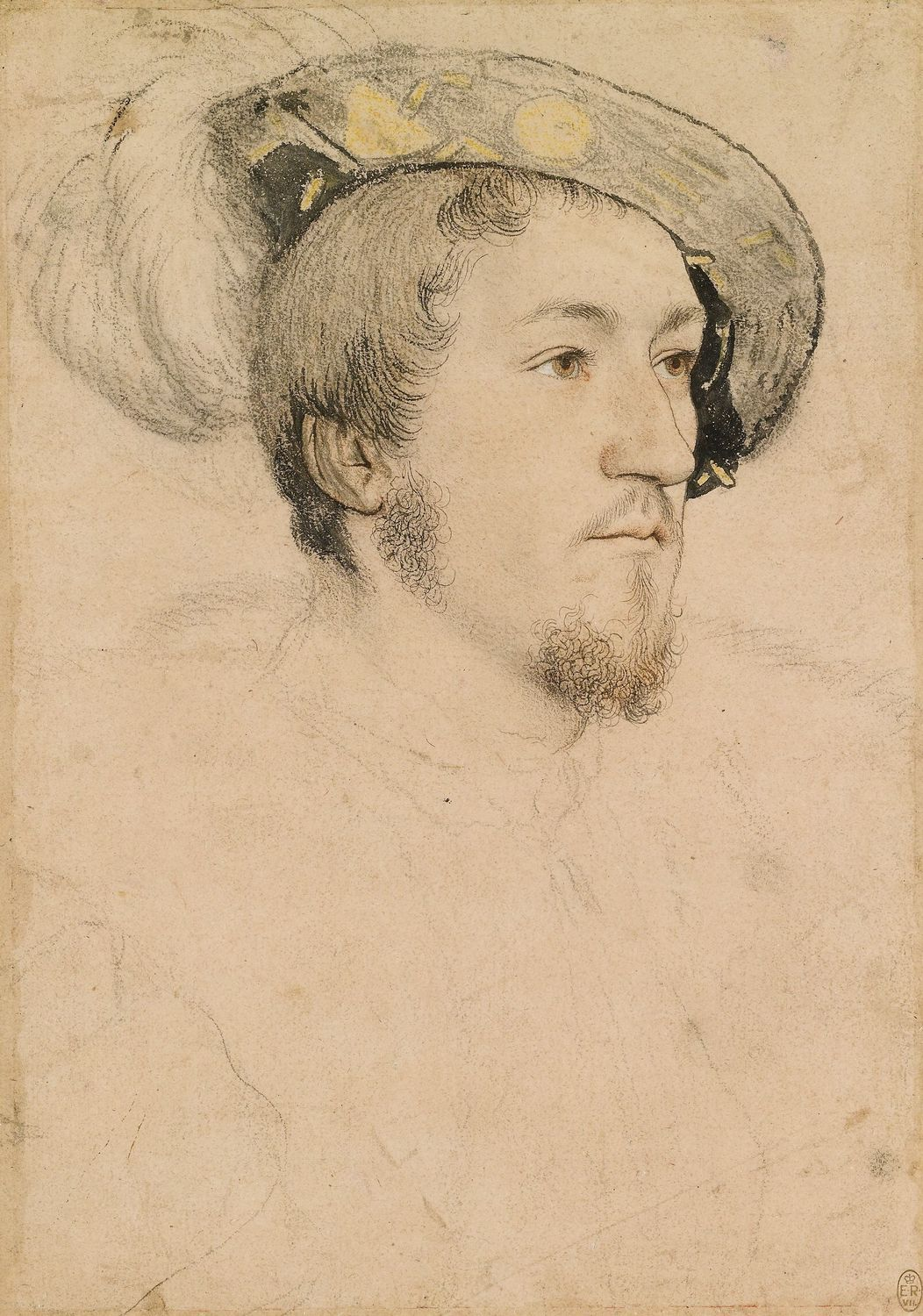
- Portrait believed to be of George Boleyn (disputed)
- Born: c. April 1504; Blickling Hall, Norfolk, England
- Died: 17 May 1536 (aged 32); Tower Hill, London, England
- Buried: Chapel Royal of St. Peter ad Vincula, Tower of London; 51.508611°N 0.076944°W
- Noble family: Boleyn
- Spouse: Jane Parker (m. 1524)
- Father: Thomas Boleyn, 1st Earl of Wiltshire
- Mother: Elizabeth Howard
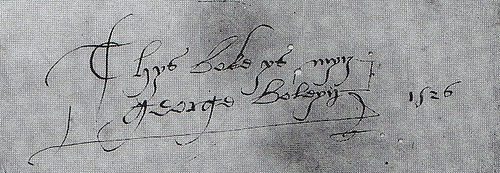
- Signature
- Occupation: Diplomat, politician, poet

George Boleyn, Viscount Rochford (c. 1504 – 17 May 1536) was an English courtier and nobleman who played a prominent role in the politics of the early 1530s as the brother of Anne Boleyn, second wife of King Henry VIII. George was the maternal uncle of Queen Elizabeth I, although he died long before his niece ascended the throne. Following his father's promotion in the peerage in 1529 to Earl of Wiltshire and Earl of Ormond, he adopted his father's junior title Viscount Rochford (created in 1525) as a courtesy title. He was accused of incest with his sister Anne during the period of her trial for high treason, as a result of which both were executed.

== Early years and family ==
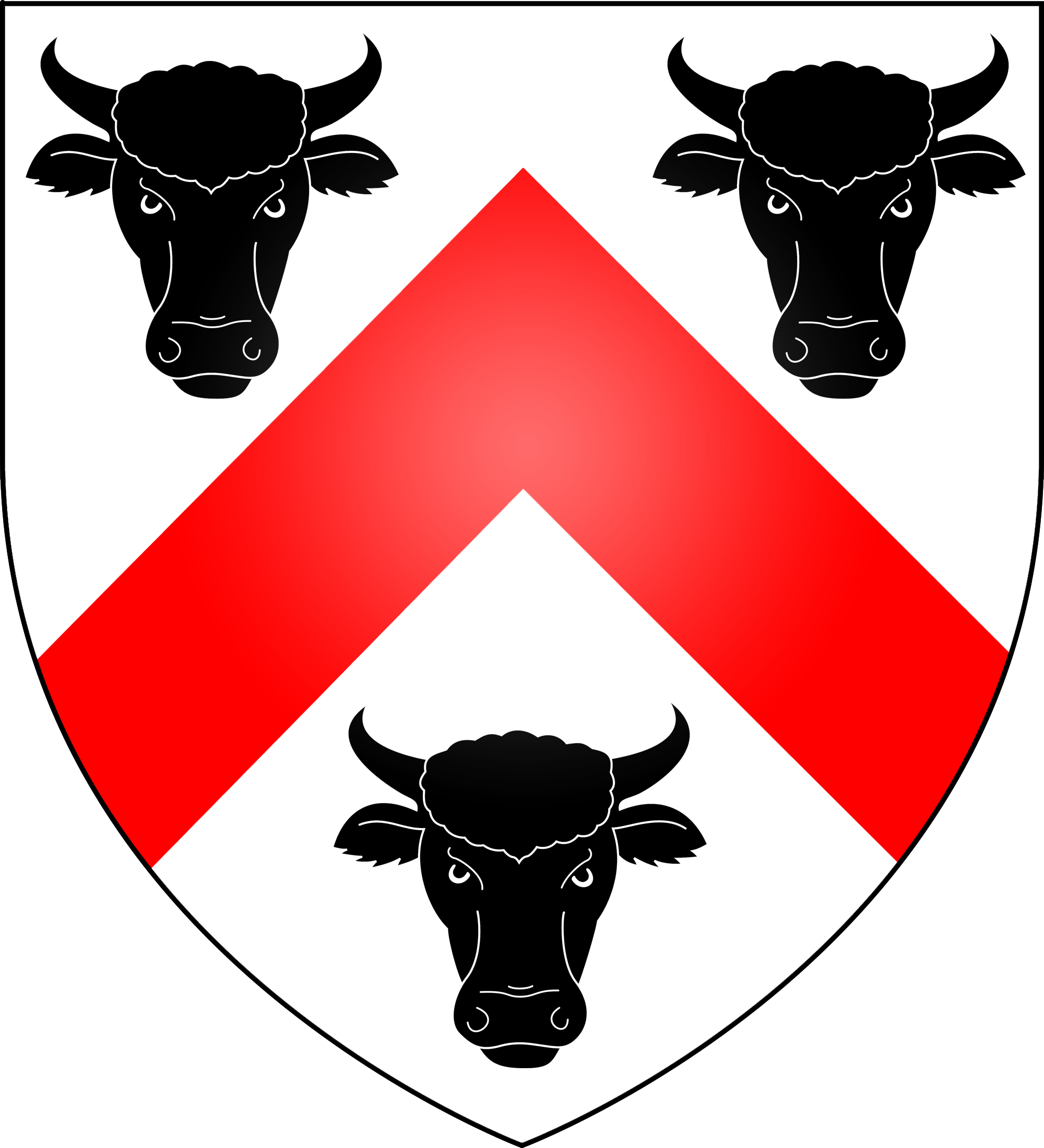
Canting arms of Boleyn: Argent, a chevron gules between three bull's heads afrontée sable. George's father later adopted the arms of Theobald Walter, 1st Chief Butler of Ireland (fl. 1194), ancestor of Butler, Marquess of Ormonde

George was the son of Thomas Boleyn, later Earl of Wiltshire and Earl of Ormond, and his wife, Elizabeth Howard, the daughter of Thomas Howard, then Earl of Surrey and future 2nd Duke of Norfolk, and his first wife Elizabeth Tilney. Therefore, on her maternal side, George was the nephew of Thomas Howard, 3rd Duke of Norfolk, and first cousin of poet, politician and soldier Lord Henry Howard, styled Earl of Surrey (his courtesy title as heir apparent to the Dukedom of Norfolk), and Lady Mary Howard, wife of Henry VIII's illegitimate son, Henry FitzRoy, Duke of Richmond and Somerset, as well as Henry VIII's future fifth wife, Catherine Howard, daughter of George's uncle, Lord Edmund Howard. George and his sisters were probably born in Norfolk at his family's home of Blickling Hall. However, they spent most of their childhood at another of the family's homes, Hever Castle in Kent, which became their chief residence in 1505 when Thomas inherited the property from his father, Sir William Boleyn.

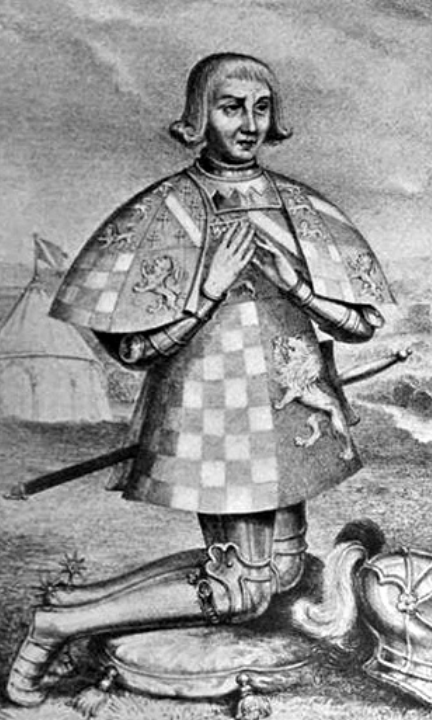
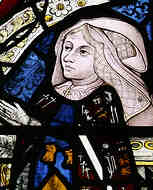
Thomas Howard, 2nd Duke of Norfolk and his wife Elizabeth Tilney, George's maternal grandparents

Thomas and Elizabeth had a number of children, including two sons named Thomas and Henry who failed to reach adulthood. Three children survived: Mary, Anne and George. There has been much debate over the centuries as to the age of the three Boleyn siblings, but there is general agreement that George was born c. 1504. This stems from a number of different sources. George Cavendish says in a poem that George was about 27 when he gained a place on the Privy Council in 1529. Cavendish gives this as a maximum age in order to make his tortuous verses more rhythmic (such as "thrice nine"). In addition to Cavendish's verses, foreign diplomats believed George was too young to be appointed as Ambassador to France in October 1529. Mary's date of birth is again generally accepted as being c. 1500 but there is some disagreement as to Anne's date of birth with arguments for 1501 and others for 1507. However, following the executions of Anne and George in 1536 their father wrote to Thomas Cromwell and in his letter he stated that upon his marriage his wife gave him a child every year. As Thomas and Elizabeth were married between 1498 and 1499, if Thomas is to be believed this indicates that all five Boleyn children, including the two who failed to reach adulthood, were born between 1500 and 1504, and if we accept as the evidence suggests that George was born in 1504 this is persuasive evidence for suggesting he was the youngest Boleyn child. This is the current thinking of the vast majority of modern historians with only one notable exception.

Like his father, it was understood that George would have a career as a courtier, politician and diplomat. The monarchy was the font of all patronage and potential wealth and it was only through service to the Royal Family that a family could hope to achieve or protect their greatness and social position. With this in mind, George was introduced to Henry VIII's court at the age of ten, when he attended the Christmas festivities of 1514–15. He attended an indoor melee with his father and acted in a mummery with his father, and the much older Charles Brandon and Nicholas Carew. Thanks to his family's influence and the fact he obviously impressed Henry at an early age, he became one of the King's pageboys shortly afterwards.

Since learning was highly praised at Court and essential for a career as a diplomat, George received an excellent education, speaking fluent French together with some Italian and Latin. His two sisters are known to have been educated abroad (Mary from 1514 to 1519, Anne from the spring of 1513 to late 1521). George is thought to have remained in England throughout his early years, although George's first biographer suggests George may have spent time in France as a child when his father was on embassy from January 1519, as an explanation for how George could speak such perfect French from a young age, and why Anne and George remained so close during their formative years. However, this is pure speculation. Whatever the case, there is a long-standing tradition that George attended the University of Oxford when he was not in attendance at Court, although he does not appear in any of the University's records – a relatively frequent occurrence in the period before the English Civil War, when few of the aristocrats who attended either technically matriculated or graduated.

== Personal life ==
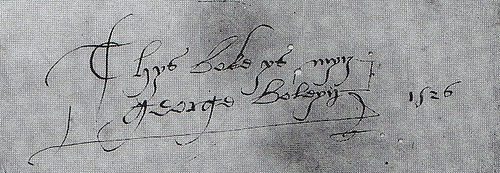
George Boleyn's signature

Less is known about George's personal life than about his celebrated court career, but what is known is that he married Jane Parker sometime during 1524. They were certainly married by January 1524 because a note of that date in Cardinal Thomas Wolsey's hand confirms that an extra £20 a year had been awarded to "young Boleyn for him and his wife to live on".

There has always been much speculation as to whether the marriage of George and Jane was happy but there is no way to know for certain, as the state papers are virtually silent with regard to Jane. There is no mention of the couple having any children, which as the brother-in-law and sister-in-law to the king, there surely would have been had such a child existed. It had been thought that George Boleyn, Dean of Lichfield, may have been their son; but it is more likely that he was a distant cousin. There is no record of the couple having a child, and Jane makes no mention of a child for whom she is responsible when she wrote a begging letter to Cromwell following George's death.

Whether or not the marriage of George and Jane was happy, George had a reputation as a womaniser. George Cavendish, gentleman usher to Cardinal Wolsey, in his poetry entitled Metrical Visions lambastes the young man for his womanising, saying:

I forced widows, maidens I did deflower.
All was one to me, I spared none at all,
My appetite was all women to devour
My study was both day and hour.

Yet in the same poem Cavendish, who was a staunch Catholic and hated the Boleyns and what they stood for, acknowledges George's good looks and charm, saying:

God gave me grace, dame nature did her part,
Endowed me with gifts of natural qualities:
Dame eloquence also taught me the art
In meter and verse to make pleasant ditties

Thomas Wyatt in his poetry recognises George's "Great wit" (although wit in the 16th century could suggest that a person was witty and charming, it mainly meant intelligence, and it is George's intelligence that Wyatt was referring to.) Wyatt's verse with respect to George reads:

Some say, 'Rochford, haddest thou not been so proud
For thou great wit each man would thee bemoan
Since it is so, many cry aloud
it is a great loss that thou art dead and gone.

Historian David Starkey referred to George as having "many of Anne's talents and all of her pride".

For all George's good looks and talent, as can be seen from the above verse, Wyatt, who was a friend of the Boleyns, also says that George was too proud. Although Wyatt's poem is often used to suggest George was hated for his arrogance, there is nothing to support this. Despite George's pride, Wyatt acknowledges that at his death many considered his death to be a great loss. It may also be that the allegations of George's womanising are exaggerated, since there was no scandal surrounding the Boleyns' marriage, and none of the Boleyns' enemies felt that George's behaviour towards women was base enough to comment on. Likewise, neither Cavendish nor the Imperial Ambassador, Eustace Chapuys, who was actively looking for faults in order to demonise the Boleyns, make any mention of him being particularly arrogant. Chapuys' only complaint was that George could not resist entering into Lutheran discussion whenever he was being entertained by him.

One modern historian, Retha Warnicke, believes that the men accused of being Anne's lovers were chosen because of ambiguity over their sexuality. This has led to an increasingly enduring myth that the men were charged with sodomy as well as treason. In fact, none of them was charged with sodomy, and there were no extant rumours of homosexuality relating to any of them. Warnicke's theory was put forth in her 1989 biography of Anne Boleyn, but has been criticised by many other historians for lack of evidence to substantiate it.

However, more recently Alison Weir has resurrected the theory regarding George's sexuality by using the same arguments that Warnicke used 20 years previously. In addition to this, Weir also suggests that by his use of the phrase forced widows, Cavendish was insinuating that George was a rapist. As with the theory of George's sexuality, there is no evidence to support the notion that he was a rapist. If he had been guilty of the criminal offences of rape or homosexuality, and if Cavendish knew about it, then so did the rest of the court. Yet no one ever commented on George's supposed bisexuality, or even hinted at it, not even enemies of the Boleyns, such as Chapuys.

Metrical Visions are Cavendish's interpretation of George's scaffold speech, when George said he was "a wretched sinner deserving of death". Despite the current enthusiasm for believing that Cavendish was referring to homosexuality, his 16th-century interpretation was that George was apologising for his promiscuity, of which he may or may not have been guilty. To use Metrical Visions and George's scaffold speech as the lone pieces of evidence to support an argument for homosexual behaviour is problematic. The verses in Metrical Visions are based merely on Cavendish's interpretation of George's scaffold speech, with Warnicke and Weir solely re-interpreting George's final words on the basis of Cavendish's writings.

== Appointments and career ==
George is first mentioned as an adult in 1522 when he and his father received a joint grant of various manor houses in Kent. The grant was made in April, suggesting that George was born in April 1504 and that this grant was an 18th-birthday gift. He received the first grant in his sole name in 1524, when at the age of 20 he received from the King a country mansion, Grimston Manor in Norfolk. It is supposed that this was an early wedding present made to a young man who was rapidly coming into favour. He was a firm favourite of the King and is regularly mentioned in the Privy Purse expenses as playing the King at bowls, tennis, card games and archery. He also hunted with the King and bet large sums of money with him. He won huge sums off the King but probably lost just as much, if not more. Gambling was one of the European aristocracy's favourite pastimes in the period.

In 1525, George was appointed gentleman of the Privy Chamber, functioning as the male equivalent to the King of what a lady-in-waiting was to the Queen. As part of a reorganisation of the Court structure, known as the Eltham Ordinance, Cardinal Wolsey, an opponent of the Boleyns, ensured that George lost this position six months later when he halved the number of gentlemen in the Privy Chamber. Wolsey used the reorganisation to get rid of those whom he perceived as a threat, which was something of a backhanded compliment to the 21-year-old Boleyn whose court prominence was already being acknowledged. As compensation, George was appointed Royal Cupbearer in January 1526 in addition to his award of an additional £20 a year for him and his wife to live on.

Following her return to England in 1519, Mary Boleyn became Henry VIII's mistress. It is not known when that relationship started or when it ended or indeed for how long it lasted. It was certainly over by 1526 when the King's eyes turned to another Boleyn sibling, Anne, and by 1527 he was seeking to marry her. Much of George Boleyn's career was in furtherance to the king's desire for a divorce from his first wife to enable him to marry Anne.

In June 1528, George contracted the disease known as sweating sickness while with the King and Catherine of Aragon at Waltham Abbey. In a letter to Anne, who also contracted the disease while at Hever Castle, Henry told her of her brother's illness and recovery.

Later that year, George was appointed Esquire of the Body and Master of the Buckhounds in 1528. Throughout the late 1520s grants continued to be bestowed upon him. On 15 November 1528 he became keeper of the Palace of Beaulieu and on 1 February 1529 was appointed chief steward of Beaulieu (later in October 1533 he would be granted a life interest in the Palace). On 29 July 1529 he was appointed Governor of Bethlehem Hospital (Bedlam), which was a profitable sinecure.

George's diplomatic career took off in late 1529 when he was knighted and regained his former position as a member of the Privy chamber. It was also in December 1529 that he became known by the courtesy title of Viscount Rochford when his father was created Earl of Wiltshire and Earl of Ormond, and undertook his first assignment as a diplomat to France as ambassador. Because of his youth, (he was only 25), it is believed that Anne's influence secured him this post, although there is no evidence that he lacked the ability to undertake the role. The French ambassador, Jean du Bellay, commented that George was considerably younger than many of the other foreign diplomats and that the appointment of a man barely out of his teens would cause amusement. But he also goes on to say that George should be shown more honour than was ordinarily necessary, and that his reception would be well weighted.

Irrespective of his age, George quickly established a good relationship with King Francis I of France and did well in his first embassy. George attended a total of six foreign embassies to France. The first was between late October 1529 and late February 1530. George attended with John Stokesley, the Dean of the Chapel Royal. Their mission was to encourage the universities of France to support Henry VIII's divorce from Catherine of Aragon. The universities' response was initially negative, but George encouraged King Francis to write a strong letter in favour of the divorce, which was later used to reverse the universities' decision.

Royal badge of Queen Anne Boleyn

The second was in March 1533 when he informed the King of France of his sister's marriage to the King of England. George was also instructed to encourage Francis into giving Henry more support, and following a lengthy debate George succeeded in obtaining a letter from Francis asking the Pope to concede to Henry's wishes. Not everyone was happy with George's success. The Bishop of Paris, who had found George's youth so amusing, described him as "the most unreasonable young man who ever crossed the sea". Yet despite the criticism Du Bellay grudgingly gave praise for the respect George Boleyn inspired at the meeting and the strength with which he argued the case.

George's third embassy was between May and August 1533 when he travelled to France with his uncle the Duke of Norfolk to be present at a proposed meeting between the King of France and Pope Clement VII. It was during this mission that news reached them that the Pope had excommunicated Henry. It was George who returned to England to inform Henry of the Pope's actions.

On 10 September 1533, George carried the canopy over his royal niece the Princess Elizabeth (later Queen Elizabeth I) at her christening, along with his uncles Lord Thomas Howard and William Howard, 1st Baron Howard of Effingham as well as John Hussey, 1st Baron Hussey of Sleaford.

His fourth embassy was in April 1534 when George was again appointed to encourage the French King to give more support to Henry's cause, to pass similar legislation against the Pope as had been passed in England, and to arrange a meeting between the two Kings and Anne.

In July 1534, George once again attended the French court, this time to rearrange the meeting that had been arranged between the kings as a result of Anne's pregnancy (she later miscarried). In George's instructions is a passage stating he is one who the King "specially loveth and trustith".

George's final embassy was in May 1535 when he and his uncle were appointed by the King to negotiate a marriage contract between the King of France's third son and the baby Princess Elizabeth, George's niece.

When George was not abroad, he often escorted foreign diplomats and ambassadors into the King's presence. Chapuys in particular regularly refers in his dispatches to meeting "the ladies brother". In October 1529, immediately prior to George's first embassy abroad, he was instructed to escort Chapuys on his first audience with the King. Chapuys refers to meeting "a civil gentleman named Boleyn". Ironically, Chapuys had liked George, before he became aware of who he was.

In addition to his diplomatic career, George was an acknowledged court poet of considerable merit, and was also much admired as a talented linguist and translator. He was passionate about religious reform and translated from French into English two magnificent religious texts as presents for his sister Anne, which he dedicates "To the right honourable lady, the Lady Marchiness of Pembroke, her most loving and friendly brother sendeth greetings." The translations codify the Lutheran doctrine which both Anne and George were so immersed in, and emphasise the joint commitment of both siblings to reform of the Church. When Anne was sent a religious pamphlet by Simon Fish, "A Supplication for the Beggars", it was George, according to Fish's wife, who encouraged Anne to show it to the King. On religious matters, the Boleyn siblings formed a team and although they were originally baptized and raised as Roman Catholics, they were identified with the new religious ideas. Though Anne had far greater influence owing to the King's infatuation with her, her brother clearly identified both of them with the ideas.

George's own religious views resulted in him having an influential role in the Reformation Parliament between its conception in late 1529 and his death in 1536. Both siblings were talented debaters on the issues of religious philosophy and it was George whom Henry chose in 1531 to argue the case for royal supremacy over the Church, before the Church's advisory body, Convocation.

On 5 February 1533, George was formally called to Parliament and his attendance rate was higher than any other Lord despite his other onerous duties, clearly indicating his commitment. He obviously voted in favour of the statutes which brought to an end the Pope's powers in England, and his commitment to religious reform earned him many enemies who held true to the Catholic faith. Various peers who were opposed to the legislation were excused attendance provided they appoint a proxy. George twice held the proxy vote of Thomas West, 9th Baron De La Warr, an adherent to the old religion. Unfortunately for George, De La Warr later sat on the jury which tried him.

In 1535 he was one of the special commissioners at the trial of Sir Thomas More and at the trial of three Carthusian Monks, all of whom, because of their religious convictions, refused to swear allegiance to the Act of Succession and Supremacy which had been passed the previous year. George, his father, the King's illegitimate son Henry Fitzroy and all other courtiers of rank were present at the monks' executions, which took place on 4 May 1535.

In June 1534, George was appointed Lord Warden of the Cinque Ports and Constable of Dover Castle. These were among the highest appointments in the realm and, as usual, he committed to them with zeal. He is regularly referred to in the State Papers in his position as Warden sitting at the Warden's court at Dover. From Thomas Cromwell's point of view, George's influence as Lord Warden was a thorn in his side. On 26 November 1534, George wrote to Cromwell expressing fury that Cromwell had undermined one of his orders made as Lord Warden.

== Trial and execution ==
In 1536, Anne Boleyn miscarried a son. This loss of the much desired son and male heir coincided with Henry's infatuation with Jane Seymour, one of his wife's maids-of-honour. To rid himself of his wife, Henry and his chief advisor, Thomas Cromwell, devised a plot whereby Anne was accused of adultery with five men, one of whom was her brother, George. George was charged with incest with the Queen and plotting with Anne to kill the King. During a conversation with Chapuys following the Boleyns' deaths, Cromwell boasted that he had gone to a great deal of trouble arranging the plot, suggesting he did so in order to assist an alliance with Spain. Yet despite his boasts, during the same conversation he greatly praised both Anne and her brother for their "sense, wit, and courage".

On 23 April 1536 George was expected to be chosen to receive the Order of the Garter, but the honour went to a known opponent of the Boleyns instead, Sir Nicholas Carew. The following day, Henry gave instructions to Cromwell to set up a special commission looking into various treasons.

Anne and George were arrested on 2 May 1536, the day after the May Day joust at which George was one of the principal jousters.

The four others implicated in the plot, Sir Henry Norris, Sir Francis Weston, Sir William Brereton, and Mark Smeaton were tried on Friday 12 May. Only Smeaton confessed, probably after torture, but certainly emotional pressure. Despite lack of evidence all four men were found guilty. Thomas Howard, 3rd Duke of Norfolk, Anne and George's maternal uncle, presided over the court that tried and sentenced the Boleyn siblings to death.

Anne was pre-judged for the earlier convictions of the men found guilty of adultery with her; therefore she stood trial before her brother. George stood trial a few hours after Anne on Monday 15 May. As Anne had been found guilty before George had stood trial, he too was pre-judged because he could hardly be acquitted when his sister had already been found guilty of incest. The order of the trials had been arranged to ensure the difficult case against George could not realistically fail. Everyone who witnessed George's trial, including the Imperial Ambassador Eustace Chapuys, considered that he put up a magnificent defence and many thought that he would be acquitted. Chapuys reported that those watching were betting 10 to 1 that he would be acquitted, and the court chronicler Charles Wriothesley said that his evidence was a marvel to hear.

There was no evidence of incest. Chapuys says he was convicted merely on a presumption. George's wife has been accused of providing evidence to support the incest charge, but this is unlikely to be correct. None of the evidence relating to the trials makes any mention of George's wife as providing evidence, save for the fact that she told in a letter that Anne had told her Henry was "not able to satisfy a woman and he had neither capacity nor virility". It seems that the majority of the courtiers believed in George's innocence, as can be seen from the wagers they were making in favour of acquittal.

Irrespective of what those at court thought, he was unanimously found guilty and the sentence of the court was that he be hanged, drawn, and quartered (the sentence was later commuted to beheading). He asked for his debts be paid out of his confiscated assets so that no one would suffer from his death, and he continued to be distressed about his debts while awaiting death. In fact his distress was so acute that the Constable of the Tower, Sir William Kingston wrote to Cromwell twice begging him to help ease George's conscience.

George Boleyn and the other four men were beheaded on Tower Hill on the morning of 17 May 1536. George's scaffold speech was extremely long and exemplified the orator's linguistic skills. For it to have been recorded in as much detail as it was, the vast crowd who witnessed the executions must have been virtually silent, and there could have been little booing or jeering as with normal state executions. His scaffold speech was primarily concerned with defending his religious beliefs and his passion for reform. It was not the honourable thing to deny guilt once a guilty verdict had been given in a court of law, and therefore he followed the conventions of the day by admitting he was a sinner deserving of death. He begged forgiveness of anyone he may have offended and begged for God's forgiveness. He came close to denying his guilt by declaring, "beware, trust not in the vanity of the world or the flatteries of the court, or the favour and treacheries of fortune". He said he would be alive if he had not done so. By blaming fortune for his fall he came as close as he dared to denying his guilt (i.e., he was dying because luck had been against him, not because he was guilty). He then went on to speak of his religious convictions before calmly submitting his neck to the axe. Anne was beheaded two days later.

== Titles ==
- George Boleyn (1504–1529)
- Sir George Boleyn (c. October 1529)
- Baron Rochford (between 1530 and 1533 – May 1536)
- Viscount Rochford (by courtesy until 5 February 1533) (8 December 1529 – May 1536)

== Fictional portrayals ==
In the 1830 tragic opera Anna Bolena by Gaetano Donizetti, the character of Lord Rochfort is based on George Boleyn, Viscount Rochford.

George Boleyn was portrayed by Michael Johnson in the 1969 film Anne of the Thousand Days and by Jonathan Newth in the 1970 television series The Six Wives of Henry VIII.

Following his prominence within The Other Boleyn Girl, the 2001 novel by Philippa Gregory, he was portrayed in the 2003 television film The Other Boleyn Girl by Steven Mackintosh and by Jim Sturgess in the 2008 cinema film The Other Boleyn Girl. Gregory portrayed George Boleyn as at least gay and possibly bisexual. However, the film adaptations of the book do not portray George as bisexual.

Boleyn was portrayed by Pádraic Delaney in the 2007 television series The Tudors. The writers of The Tudors not only portrayed George as bisexual, but also portrayed his relationship with his wife as abusive.

George Boleyn is one of two protagonists (along with sister Anne) in a play by British writer Joanna Carrick, Fallen in Love. It was originally produced in 2011 in the grounds of Gippeswyk Hall in Ipswich in Suffolk, and subsequently reprised for performances at the Tower of London and Gippeswyk Hall in May 2013, directed by Carrick as artistic director of Red Rose Chain theatre company. In the 2013 production, George was portrayed by Scott Ellis and Anne by Emma Connell.

In the 2015 BBC Two adaptation of Hilary Mantel's Wolf Hall, George Boleyn is portrayed by Edward Holcroft.

In the 2021 Channel 5 series Anne Boleyn, he was played by Paapa Essiedu.

In the 2022 BBC Two three-part series The Boleyns: A Scandalous Family, George is portrayed by Sam Retford.

Political offices
Preceded by Sir Edward Guilford	Lord Warden of the Cinque Ports; 1534–1536	Succeeded by The Duke of Richmond
Court offices
New office	Master of the Buckhounds; 1533–1536	Vacant Title next held by Sir Richard Long
