= Richard Weston (treasurer) =

Member of the Parliament of England

Sir Richard Weston, (representative image, not portrait) drawn by Sir Thomas Wriothesley in 1509, attending deathbed of King Henry VII. (Detail from: British Library Additional MS 45131, folio 54)

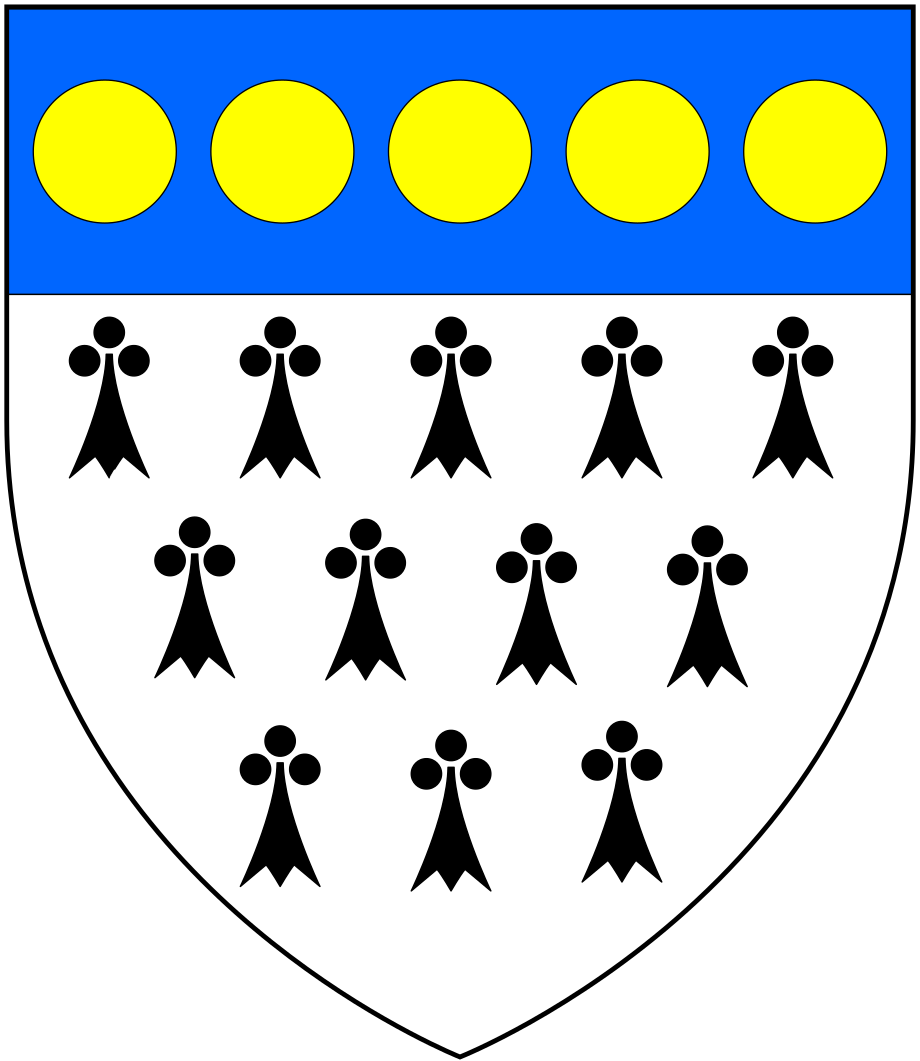
Arms of Weston: Ermine, on a chief azure five bezants

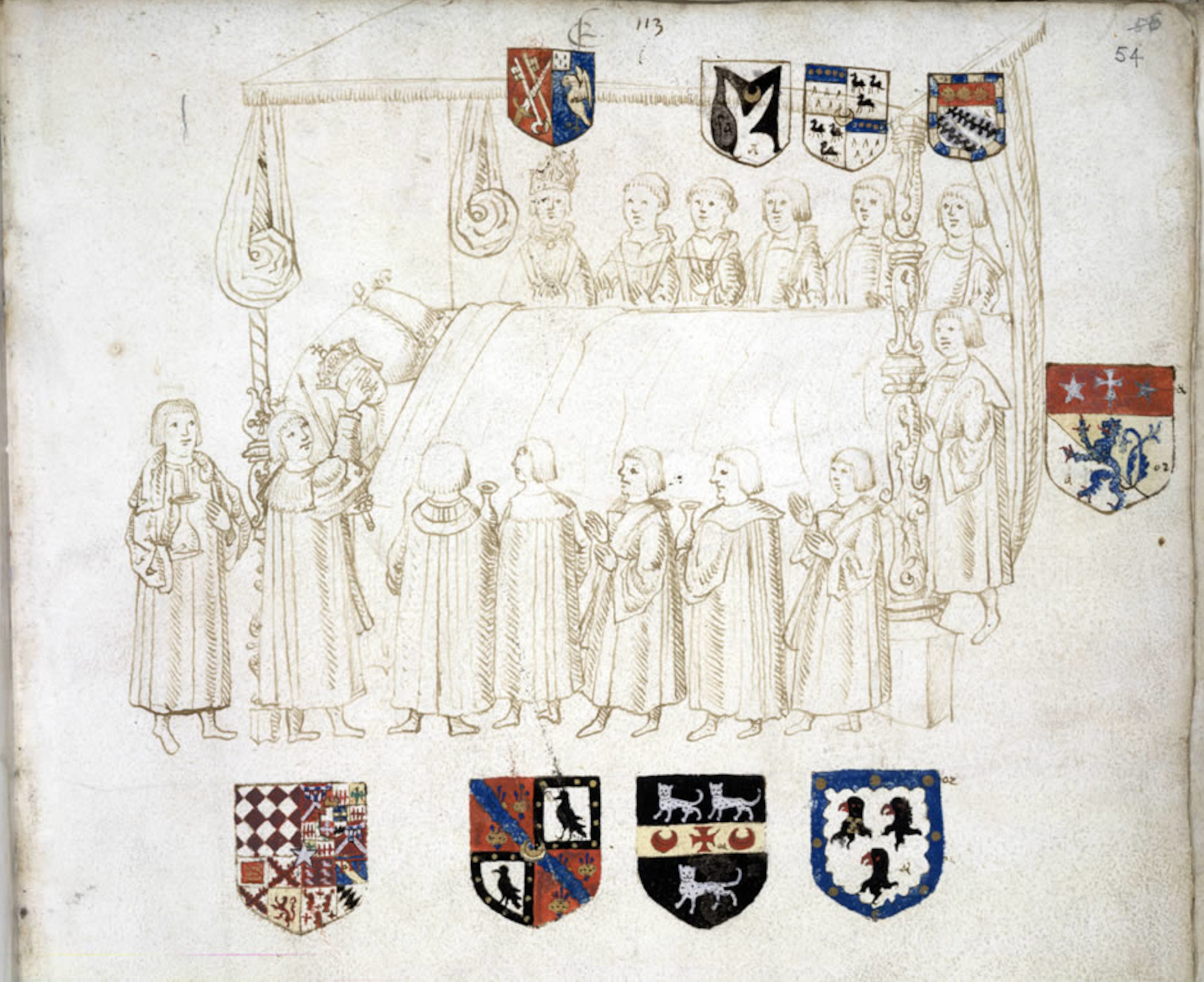
Sir Richard Weston at the deathbed of King Henry VII at Richmond Palace, 1509. He stands 5th at the King's left hand, his armorials above, quartering Camell of Shapwick, Dorset, with a crescent for difference of a second son

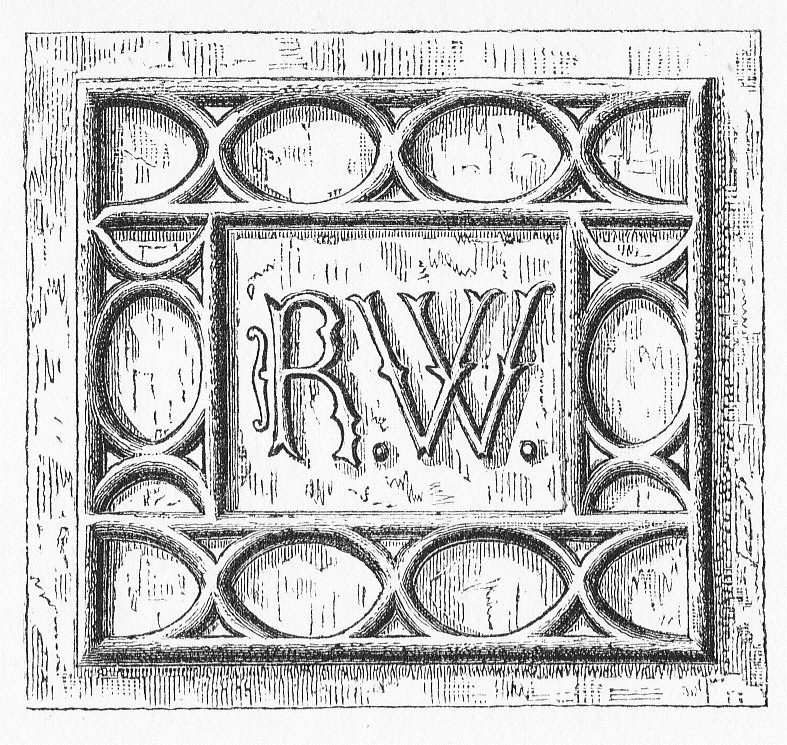
Monogram of Sir Richard Weston, 1520s terracotta moulding, Sutton Place

Rebus of Weston, a "waisted-tun", a barrel with concave ends. 1520s terracotta moulding, Sutton Place

Sir Richard Weston (1465–1542), KB, of Sutton Place in the parish of Guildford in Surrey, was a courtier and diplomat who served as Governor of Guernsey, Treasurer of Calais and Under-Treasurer of the Exchequer during the reign of King Henry VIII.

== Origins ==
He was born about 1465/6, the eldest son of Edmund Weston of Boston in Lincolnshire by his wife Katherine Cammel, daughter and heiress of Robert Cammel of Fiddleford in Dorset. He quartered the canting arms of Cammel, also of Shapwick, Dorset: Argent, three camels sable. His brother was Sir William Weston (died 1540), the last Prior of the Order of St John in England, deemed Premier Baron of England. His ancestors had long held high office in the Knights Hospitallers.

== Career ==
His biographer Frederic Harrison of Sutton Place wrote (1899):

There is hardly a single state ceremony or event during the eighth Henry's reign in which he is not recorded to have part. A bare list of the offices he held would fill some pages. He is a soldier, seaman, ambassador, governor, treasurer, privy councillor, judge of the Court of Wards.

Immediately after his accession on 22 May 1509, Henry VIII appointed Weston to several offices, including that of Governor of Guernsey. In 1511, Weston served under Thomas Darcy, 1st Baron Darcy, in the English contingent sent to assist King Ferdinand of Spain in his campaign against the Moors. Upon his return, Weston visited the court of Spain and received considerable honour. He was knighted by Henry VIII in 1514, and from 1516, was in personal attendance on the king as a Knight of the Body. On 3 January 1518, he was created a Knight of the Bath. In 1519, he was one of the four "sad and ancient knights" who were "put into the king's privy chamber", i.e. he was appointed a Knight of the Privy Chamber. In 1520, he followed Henry to the Field of the Cloth of Gold, as one of the eight county representatives for Berkshire. In 1521, he sat on the jury which tried and condemned Edward Stafford, 3rd Duke of Buckingham. The royal manor of Sutton was granted to him on 17 May 1521, the day of the Duke of Buckingham's execution.

In 1523, Weston served in France under Charles Brandon, 1st Duke of Suffolk; in 1525, he became Treasurer of Calais, a personal possession of the king and thus a personal appointment of great honour, and in 1528, Under-Treasurer of England. He also served as a Knight of the Shire for Berkshire in 1529.

His main residences were Cranbourne Lodge, where he was the keeper, and Ufton Court, both in Berkshire, and then Sutton Place, Surrey, which he re-built in a ground-breaking style, the last two being granted to him by the king. In 1533, Henry VIII paid a state visit to Weston at his newly built mansion at Sutton Place. Thomas Cromwell was a guest there later.

In 1539, Weston was appointed to meet Anne of Cleves on her arrival in England, when he must have been considerably over seventy years of age. In 1542, he surrendered his post of sub-treasurer of England "ob senectutem debilitatam et continuam infirmitatem" (20 January) and died on 7 August. He was buried in the Weston Chapel, built by him in Holy Trinity Church, Guildford. He was succeeded in his estates by his six year-old grandson Henry Weston, the son of his executed son Francis Weston.

== Marriage and children ==
He married Anne Sandys, a daughter of Oliver Sandys of Shere, and one of the Gentlewomen of Queen Katherine of Aragon, by whom he had a son and two daughters as follows:

- Sir Francis Weston (d.1536), only son and heir apparent, who in 1530 married Anne Pickering, a daughter of Sir Christopher Pickering of Killington in Cumberland, by whom he had a son Henry Weston (born 1535). Francis was arrested as one of the alleged lovers of Anne Boleyn, the second wife of King Henry VIII. Although his father is said to have offered all the family had in order to gain a pardon for his son, Sir Francis was executed in 1536.
- Margaret Weston married Walter Denys of Dyrham, Gloucestershire.
- Katherine Weston.
