= Mark Smeaton =

16th-century court musician executed for treason and adultery

- Born: c. 1512
- Died: 17 May 1536 (aged 23–24); Tower Hill, London
- Cause of death: Decapitation
- Resting place: Tower of London, London, England; 51.508611°N 0.076944°W
- Occupation: Court musician to Henry VIII

Mark Smeaton (c. 1512 – 17 May 1536) was a musician at the court of Henry VIII of England, in the household of Queen Anne Boleyn. Smeaton – together with the Queen's brother George Boleyn, Viscount Rochford; Henry Norris, Francis Weston, and William Brereton – was executed for treason and adultery with Queen Anne.

== Background ==
Mark Smeaton's exact date of birth is unknown but it is believed he was around 23 years old when he was executed in 1536. While there are few specifics about Smeaton's life, it is thought that he was the son of a carpenter and a seamstress. His surname is thought to be of Flemish-French Flemish origin, as 'Smeaton' could be a derivation of either de Smet or de Smedt.

Known for his talents as a singer, Smeaton was a handsome musician and dancer in Henry VIII's court who later transferred into the court of Queen Anne. In addition to his singing ability, he also played the lute, viol, virginals and the organ. Smeaton originally joined the choir of Cardinal Wolsey. After Wolsey's fall from grace, Smeaton was transferred from the Cardinal's service to Henry's Chapel Royal, where his musical ability came to the notice of the Queen. Established as a court musician, he was named a Groom of the Privy Chamber in 1532.

Of lowly social standing, he was never part of the Queen's intimate circle of companions, which included her favourite ladies-in-waiting and courtiers. Anne herself once reprimanded him for assuming she would speak to him in the same way she would speak to an aristocrat. A poem by the courtier Sir Thomas Wyatt the Elder made reference to his apparent social-climbing.

== Arrest ==
His unhappiness was said to have caught Queen Anne's attention one day in her chamber at Winchester, when she sent for him to play the virginals. As Anne later confessed, "[On] Saturday before May Day… I found him standing in the round window in my chamber of presence. And I asked him why he was so sad, and he answered and said it was no matter." Smeaton's reply was non-committal. Anne replied, "You may not look to have me speak to you as I should do to a nobleman, because you are an inferior person." Knowing the truth of her words, Smeaton miserably replied, "No, no, Madam. A look sufficeth, thus fare you well." Fatefully, this conversation with the Queen was quickly reported to Thomas Cromwell, one of the King's advisors, who was looking for evidence of Anne committing treason and adultery. It is generally accepted that Anne was accused of adultery to free her husband, Henry VIII, to marry a new wife, Jane Seymour, whom he married less than two weeks after Anne's execution. On Cromwell's orders, Smeaton was arrested on 30 April 1536. Cromwell took Smeaton to his house in Stepney and, according to the Spanish Chronicle, is said to have tortured him with a knotted cord around his eyes. Anne is not thought to have noticed his disappearance nor had she been informed of his arrest.

At 6 pm on 1 May, Smeaton was sent to the Tower of London. Before his arrest, Smeaton was known to spend lavishly on horses and liveries. This was seen as suspicious, as Smeaton earned only £100 a year; the implication being that he had received money from the Queen in exchange for "services" as her lover. While at the Tower, Smeaton confessed to being the Queen's lover. The confession did not align with the facts: Smeaton stated he was with the Queen on 13 May 1535 at Greenwich. However, it is recorded that she was not at Greenwich on that date but at Richmond. It is believed that when being pressured to confess, Smeaton also supplied the names of members of the Queen's circle and all were subsequently arrested. Those arrested for alleged adultery with Anne as a result of Smeaton's confession were Sir Francis Weston, Henry Norris, William Brereton, and her brother, George Boleyn, Viscount Rochford. All but Smeaton maintained their innocence, but none of them were tortured as Smeaton was. Out of all those arrested for adultery, Smeaton's arrest caused the greatest scandal, because those who knew of the charges were shocked that the Queen would have an affair with a person of such low degree.

A slightly different version of the events surrounding Smeaton's guilty plea is told by the nineteenth century English historical writer and poet, Agnes Strickland. Strickland maintained that Smeaton was lured into signing the incriminating deposition by the subtlety of Sir William Fitzwilliam, 1st Earl of Southampton. As Fitzwilliam tried to make Smeaton feel dishonourable enough to confess, he noticed Smeaton's terror and said, "Subscribe, Mark, and you will see what will come of it". Whether Smeaton was tortured or coaxed into guilt, "it was generally said that he had his life promised him, but it was not fit to let him live to tell tales."

== Trial and execution ==
The evidence against Mark Smeaton rested on his expenditure and the one reported conversation. His trial took place at Westminster Hall, but it was generally believed there was no question of his guilt. After being found guilty, Smeaton was condemned to death on 17 May 1536, as were the four other men accused of being the Queen's lovers. Queen Anne was condemned to death two days later. It was alleged by one of Anne's ladies-in-waiting, thought to be Elizabeth Browne, Countess of Worcester, that the Queen "admitted some of her court to come into her chamber at undue hours". On news that Smeaton was now clapped in irons, Queen Anne replied dismissively, "he was a person of mean birth and the others were all gentlemen". It is said that when she heard Smeaton had failed to withdraw his "confession" in fully explicit terms, the Queen expressed anger.

As he was being led to his execution, Smeaton stumbled back from the bloody scaffold. Collecting himself, he said despairingly, "Masters, I pray you all pray for me, for I have deserved the death". Smeaton's form of execution was beheading, rather than the brutal quartering usually assigned to commoners; the reason is thought to have been due to his co-operation with Anne's enemies.

Smeaton's body was buried in a common grave with one of the other accused adulterers, William Brereton. Years after Smeaton's death, Queen Mary convinced herself that her sister, Elizabeth, whom she considered a rival for her throne, was illegitimate and actually the product of the alleged affair between Smeaton and Anne. Mary repeated on more than one occasion that she thought Elizabeth had the "face and countenance" of Smeaton. However, Elizabeth's resemblance to Henry VIII was so obvious that Mary had little luck in convincing anyone else, and the accusation that Smeaton was Elizabeth's father died with Mary.

A poem about the five executed men, allegedly written by Sir Thomas Wyatt the Elder, contains the following verse dedicated to Mark Smeaton:

Ah! Mark, what moan should I for thee make more,
Since that thy death thou hast deserved best,
Save only that mine eye is forced sore
With piteous plaint to moan thee with the rest?
A time thou hadst above thy poor degree,
The fall whereof thy friends may well bemoan:
A rotten twig upon so high a tree
Hath slipped thy hold, and thou art dead and gone.

== In popular media ==
Smeaton was portrayed by Gary Bond in the 1969 costume dramatic film Anne of the Thousand Days. In it, Smeaton is depicted as being tortured by Cromwell's henchmen. In 1971, Michael Osborne portrayed Smeaton in the second episode of The Six Wives of Henry VIII. One scene shows the knotted rope being twisted onto his eyes.

In the 1972 feature film remake of the BBC miniseries, Henry VIII and His Six Wives, Smeaton is portrayed by Damien Thomas and is depicted participating in a court masque with Anne Boleyn which mocks the downfall of Cardinal Wolsey. The torture of Smeaton is shown in the film in a more explicit fashion than the miniseries.

The character of Mark Smeaton appeared in the second season of Showtime's The Tudors and was portrayed by David Alpay. In the series, he is depicted as having a sexual relationship with Anne's brother, George Boleyn. It is believed that Smeaton being portrayed as gay may have been based on the theories of Retha Warnicke, who argued that Smeaton and George Boleyn had been sexually intimate.

Smeaton is fleshed out as a character in the novels Wolf Hall and Bring Up the Bodies by Hilary Mantel, and the TV miniseries adaptation Wolf Hall, in which he is portrayed by Max Fowler. Told from Cromwell's point of view, the story shows Smeaton intimidated and manipulated into a confession rather than being tortured. He and the other four accused of adultery with Queen Anne are executed as the culmination of a careful vendetta against them by Cromwell, in revenge for their production of a mocking dramatisation of the downfall of Cardinal Wolsey shortly after his death, which was also depicted in 1972's Henry VIII and His Six Wives.

In the Royal Shakespeare Company plays that Michael Poulton adapted from Hilary Mantel's books, also called "Wolf Hall" and "Bring Up The Bodies" (though the latter was changed to "Wolf Hall Part 2" when the plays transferred from England to New York), Joey Batey played Mark Smeaton.

Smeaton appears in Gaetano Donizetti's opera Anna Bolena, in which the character is a trouser role assigned to a contralto.

Jack Benny portrayed Smeaton in an extended fantasy sequence in The Jack Benny Program television show (S:7 E:6) entitled "Jack locked in the Tower of London" which originally aired 2 December 1956.

Chris Clynes portrayed Smeaton in the BBC documentary drama The Six Queens of Henry VIII (S:1 E:2) entitled "Anne Boleyn" which originally aired in 2016.

Smeaton was portrayed by Nitai Levi in Michael Poulton's 2024 stage adaptation of the Philippa Gregory Novel "The Other Boleyn Girl", directed by Lucy Bailey for the Chichester Festival Theatre.

Mark Smeaton is also the central character in The Queen's Musician, a novel by Martha Jean Johnson. She incorporates the few facts that are actually known about Smeaton into a story about life in the Tudor court. The plot depicts Anne Boleyn's rise and fall from Smeaton's perspective and that of lady-in-waiting Madge Shelton, another little-known historical figure

== Bibliography ==
- Bevan, Richard (5 November 2012). "Anne Boleyn and the Downfall of Her Family". BBC: History. BBC.
- Farquhar, Michael (2001). A Treasury of Royal Scandals: The Shocking True Stories of History's Wickedest, Weirdest, Most Wanton Kings, Queens, Tsars, Popes, and Emperors. New York: Penguin Books. ISBN 0140280243.
- Warnicke, Retha M. (1989). The Rise and Fall of Anne Boleyn. Cambridge: Cambridge University Press. ISBN 9780521406772.
- Weir, Alison (2008). The Six Wives of Henry VIII. London: Vintage. ISBN 9780099523628.
