= Henry Norris (courtier) =

English courtier

- Born: c. 1482
- Died: 17 May 1536 (aged 53–54); Tower Hill, London
- Cause of death: Decapitation
- Resting place: Tower of London, London, United Kingdom; 51.508611°N 0.076944°W
- Occupation: Groom of the Stool to Henry VIII
- Spouse: Mary Fiennes
- Children: Henry Norris, 1st Baron Norreys; Edward; Mary
- Parent(s): Sir Edward Norris; Frideswide Lovell

Henry Norris (or Norreys) (c. 1482 – 17 May 1536) was an English courtier who was Groom of the Stool in the privy chamber of King Henry VIII. While a close servant of the King, he also supported the faction in court led by Queen Anne Boleyn, and when Anne fell out of favour, he was among those accused of treason and adultery with her. He was found guilty and executed, together with the Queen's brother, George Boleyn, Viscount Rochford, Sir Francis Weston, William Brereton and Mark Smeaton. Most historical authorities argue that the accusations were untrue and part of a plot to get rid of Anne.

== Family ==
Many sources state that Henry was the second son of Sir Edward Norris of Yattendon Castle in Berkshire, by his wife Lady Frideswide Lovell, daughter of John Lovel, 8th Baron Lovel and 5th Baron Holand of Titchmarsh, Northamptonshire and his wife Joan de Beaumont (about 1440 – 5 August 1466) of Edenham. Some of these also state that Edward Norris died in 1487. So the birth date of 1482 for Henry would be consistent with this. However, Eric Ives claimed that Henry was younger, born in the 1490s, and stated that he was "apparently the second son of Richard Norris". Richard was Edward's younger brother, but according to the Heralds' Visitations of Berkshire (1664/6), he was the father of only a single daughter, Anne. This is consistent with the descent of his manor of Great Shefford which she inherited around 1522, before Henry's execution in 1536. Had he been Richard's son and not Sir Edward's, he would have inherited the manor. Therefore, it is likely, in this instance, that Ives was incorrect.

Whichever version is correct, all sources agree that Henry's grandfather, Sir William Norris, had taken part in the Battle of Stoke Field on 16 June 1487 at the conclusion of the Wars of the Roses.

Henry's brother, John Norreys (about 1481 – 21 October 1564), served four successive English monarchs during his lifetime. John occupied the post of Esquire of the Body under Henry VII of England, going on to become Usher of the Outer Chamber under both Henry VIII and Edward VI, and finally the Chief Usher of the Privy Chamber under Mary I.

Francis Lovell, 1st Viscount Lovell (1454 – after 1488), Henry's maternal uncle, was a notable champion of the House of York during the Wars of the Roses until he mysteriously disappeared after the Battle of Stoke Field. Henry's aunt, Joan Lovell (after 1450 – ??), was married to Brian de Stapleton about 1476.

=== Marriage and issue ===
Henry married Mary Fiennes, daughter of Thomas Fiennes, 8th Lord Dacre and Anne Bourchier, and by her he had three surviving children:

- Henry Norris, 1st Baron Norreys of Rycote, born around 1525, was educated with Mary Boleyn's son, Henry Carey.
- Edward (1524 – 16 July 1529)
- Mary, married, firstly, Sir George Carew who died in the sinking of the Mary Rose in 1545 and, secondly, Sir Arthur Champernowne.

=== Spelling of name ===
The name Norreys has at least two potential derivations: one who came from the north or who lived in the north (there was a word "noreis" or "norreis" meaning a northerner), or from one who cared for others (the word "norrice" for nurse). There are also references to Noreis back in the 12th century, and to a Robert le Noris in the 1297 Yorkshire Subsidy Roll.

== Career ==
Henry Norris arrived at Court during his youth and became a close friend of King Henry VIII, who appointed him a Gentleman of the Bedchamber and granted him many offices, the first (in 1515) being keeper of Foliejon Park in Winkfield. He was serving in the King's Privy Chamber by 1517. In 1518 he became weigher at the common beam at Southampton, then the great mart of the Italian merchants. On 28 January 1518/19 he was appointed bailiff of Ewelme and in 1519 was awarded an annuity of 50 marks (about £33).

He attended the meeting between King Henry VIII and King Francis I of France now known as the Field of the Cloth of Gold in 1520. In 1523 he received the Keepership of Langley New Park, Buckinghamshire, and was made bailiff of Watlington.

In 1526 he replaced Sir William Compton in the post of Groom of the Stool and was in charge of the gentlemen of the King's Privy Chamber. According to Ives (2004) in this position he was not only the King's confidant but also perhaps the closest friend the King had. In October of the same year, he succeeded Compton as Gentleman Usher of the Black Rod.

Norris risked the wrath of Anne Boleyn's faction when, just before the fall of Thomas Wolsey, he offered the Cardinal his own rooms when the Cardinal had deliberately been left without accommodation. He was present when Wolsey resigned the Great Seal. On 24 October 1529 he was the King's only attendant when Henry went with Anne and her mother to inspect Wolsey's property. He was the bearer of Henry's kind message to Wolsey at Putney about the same time, and it seems he was affected by Wolsey's fallen condition.

Also in 1529, he received a grant of £100 a year from the revenues of the see of Winchester. In 1531, he was made chamberlain of North Wales. In 1534, he was appointed constable of Beaumaris Castle. In 1535 he received various manors which Sir Thomas More had held. He was present at the execution of the Charterhouse monks on 4 May 1535, and Henry granted him the important constableship of Wallingford Castle on 29 November.

Norris had helped Anne Boleyn while she established her position at Court and became one of her close friends and a leader of the faction that supported her attempts to wield political power. This brought him into conflict with Thomas Cromwell, a leader in the Dissolution of the Monasteries.

At the time of his death Norris's gross annual income from crown annuities, fees of offices, farms and grants amounted to £1241 2s 3d per annum and his income from private sources raised this figure to £1327 15s 7d. This income combined with additional gratuities made Norris wealthier than many of the nobility.

== Arrest, trial and execution ==
In 1536 Anne Boleyn fell out of favour with the king, and Norris, as a close confidant and supporter, was immediately put at risk. The growing threat was a consequence of the negotiations which were being carried out with the French ambassador at Greenwich on 18 April 1536. It was clear to Thomas Cromwell that Anne Boleyn and her associates stood in the way of what he sought to achieve and with the King's approval he started to investigate and to secure evidence for charges of treason to be laid against Anne, Norris, and four other courtiers (Mark Smeaton, William Brereton, Sir Francis Weston and Anne's brother George).

Norris was accused of being solicited by Anne at Westminster on 6 October 1533, and of adultery on 12 October and again at Greenwich in November. The prosecution's choice of these dates appears now particularly improbable and therefore careless. At that time Anne was in Greenwich, not Westminster, and recovering from the birth of Elizabeth on 7 September. As well as specific charges, there was a catch-all charge of committing adultery at diverse times and places. Most historians think that all the charges were fabrications.

A grand jury was assembled at Westminster Hall on 9 May and decided there was a case to answer for the offences that had occurred at Whitehall. John Baldwin, a chief justice, presided with six of his judicial colleagues. On 10 May, Baldwin with three assistants went to Deptford, where a Kent jury decided there was a case to answer on the events that had taken place at Greenwich.

With the committals in hand, Cromwell proceeded to arrange the trial for the four who were not members of the higher nobility (i.e. Norris, William Brereton and Sir Francis Weston, who were landed gentry, and Mark Smeaton, who was a commoner). The trial was held in Westminster Hall on 12 May. The jury was packed with people who had reason to be hostile to Anne Boleyn's cause or had a personal enmity with one of the accused, but also with Anne's own father Thomas Boleyn, her uncle, the Duke of Norfolk and the man she had wished to marry 13 years before, Henry Percy, 6th Earl of Northumberland. Sir William Paulet, controller of the King's household, was one of the judges. All four pleaded not guilty to all the charges with the exception of Smeaton, who, as a commoner, was subjected to torture and pleaded guilty to one charge of adultery. The accused had to improvise their defences on the spot, with no help from any defence counsel, and no advance warning of the evidence. The hostile prosecutors duly secured a guilty verdict. All four were sentenced to be hanged, drawn and quartered. Because all were in service of the Royal Court, this sentence was commuted to the less terrifying one of beheading by the executioner's axe.

The execution was carried out on 17 May 1536 on Tower Hill. Unlike the other accused, who with carefully chosen words indicated their innocence, Norris did not risk reimposition of the harsher method of execution and so said little on the scaffold. According to Sir Robert Naunton, Queen Elizabeth I always honoured his memory, believing that he died "in a noble cause and in the justification of her mother's innocence."

Henry VIII took possession of Norris's house "Parlaunt" at Langley Marish. When Henry married Anne of Cleves in 1540, furnishings from Parlaunt were taken to Oatlands Palace.

== Portrayals ==
In Wolf Hall, a BBC Two series adaptation of the historical novels Wolf Hall and Bring Up the Bodies by Hilary Mantel, Harry Norris was portrayed by Luke Roberts.

In The Tudors (2007-2010), a Showtime original series, Henry Norris was portrayed by Stephen Hogan.

== Bibliography ==
- Amyot, T., ed. (1831). "Memorial from George Constantyne to Thomas Cromwell". Archaeologia. Vol. 23. London: Society of Antiquaries.
- Archbold, W. A. J. (1895). "Norris, Henry (d.1536)" . In Lee, Sidney (ed.). Dictionary of National Biography. Vol. 41. London: Smith, Elder & Co. pp. 121–122.
- Banks, T. C. (1844). Baronia Anglica Concentrata; or, a Concentrated Account of All the Baronies Commonly Called Baronies in Fee; Deriving their Origin from Writ of Summons, and not from any Specific Limited Creation ... Whereto is Added the Proofs of Parliamentary Sitting from the Reign of Edw. I. to that of Queen Anne: Also a Glossary of Dormant English, Scotch and Irish peerage Titles,... Ripon: Printed for the Author by William Harrison.
- Copinger, W. A. (1908). The Manors of Suffolk; Notes on their History and Devolution; The Hundreds of Blything and Bosmere and Claydon; With Some Illustrations of Old Manor Houses. Vol. 2. Manchester: Taylor, Garnett, Evans & Co.
- Ives, E. W. (July 1992). "The Fall of Anne Boleyn Reconsidered". The English Historical Review. 107 (424): 651–664. doi:10.1093/ehr/cvii.ccccxxiv.651. in JSTOR
- Ives, Eric (2005). The Life and Death of Anne Boleyn: 'The Most Happy'. Oxford: Blackwell Publishing. ISBN 978-1-4051-3463-7.
- Ives, E. W. (May 2009) [First published 2004]. "Norris, Henry". Oxford Dictionary of National Biography (online ed.). Oxford University Press. doi:10.1093/ref:odnb/20271. (Subscription, Wikipedia Library access or UK public library membership required.)
- "Letters and Papers, Foreign and Domestic, Henry VIII" – via British History Online.
- Naunton, Robert; Caulfield, James (1814). Memoirs of Sir Robert Naunton, Knt., Author of "The Fragmenta Regalia"; With Some of His Posthumous Writings, With Manuscripts in his own Hand, Never Before Printed. [Compiled by James Caulfield]. London: G. Smeeton; J. Caulfield.
- Ridgway, Claire (2012). The Fall of Anne Boleyn: A Countdown. MadeGlobal Publishing. ISBN 978-1475266122.
- Rylands, W. Harry, ed. (1907). The Four Visitations of Berkshire Made and Taken by Thomas Benolte, Clarenceux, Anno 1532; By William Harvey, Clarenceux, Anno 1566; By Henry Chiting, Chester Herald, and John Philipott, Rouge Dragon, for William Camden, Clarenceux, Anno 1623; and By Elias Ashmole, Windsor Herald, for Sir Edward Bysshe, Clarenceux, Anno 1665–66. I. Publications of the Harleian Society. Vol. LVI. London: Harleian Society.
- Trim, D. J. B. (January 2008) [First published 2004]. "Norris [Norreys], Sir John". Oxford Dictionary of National Biography (online ed.). Oxford University Press. doi:10.1093/ref:odnb/20276. (Subscription, Wikipedia Library access or UK public library membership required.)
- Williams, Joanna M. (1990). "The Political Career of Francis Viscount Lovell. 1456-?". The Ricardian: Journal of the Richard III Society. 8: 393–94.
