= Eltham Ordinance =

Unrealised proposals put forward by Cardinal Thomas Wolsey

The Eltham Ordinance of January 1526 was the failed reform of the English court of Henry VIII by Cardinal Thomas Wolsey. It is named after the Eltham Palace in Kent, where Wolsey devised his plan. The Ordinance, which targeted Wolsey's influential opponents from the Privy Chamber, would have given the Cardinal immense political power, but the plan did not materialize.

The text of the ordinance was printed by the Society of Antiquaries in 1790.

== Background ==
Wolsey jealously watched the rising influence of Henry's courtiers. By around 1518, he himself amassed enough influence to control the access of lay courtiers to the king, but the Privy Chamber and the King's council remained a formidable obstacle. In 1526, Wolsey settled for a radical reform of the court. According to the Eltham Ordinance, the court council should have been reduced in size to a compact, working council that could accompany the King during his travels. There would have been twenty permanent council members, "the most important officers of the realm", who would meet the King daily at his dining chamber. They would have been free from private affairs and capable of giving attention to all the important issues of the government.

The Ordinance began with a statement that during Henry's absence from the Court in London the latter "hath been greatly hindered and in manner subverted, which by little and little is now come more and more unto an indirect course far from good constitutions of old times..." "rascals and vagabonds now spread and remaining and being in all the court..." Pincombe and Shrank wrote that the excuse of Henry's absence "was nothing more than a convenient fiction". The primary aim declared in the Ordinance was quite practical: to limit the expenses of the court, especially on the move. Royal Progresses of the Tudors, accompanied by countless courtiers, attendants, and their servants, devastated the country. The royal train had to move regularly to new areas simply to obtain new sources of food. Financial strain caused by England's wars with France was another consideration. However, the actual financial standing of the government and the degree of the need to control expenses remain uncertain.

== Content ==
The Ordinance was presented as a serious attempt to reform the court, continuing the household reform of 1525, and formulated as a detailed set of rules regulating the life of the court. Pincombe and Shrank wrote that the degree of regulation, down to "the management of spent candles", was "utopian in scale and ambition". The lists of household items regulated by the Ordinance (like candle wax) provide historians with an insight into what was deemed expensive or rare. These items, now considered ordinary, formed the "spatial decorum" of the court. The Ordinance was filled with precautions against theft of household items, even furniture, indicating that such theft was commonplace. It attempted to expel "rascals and vagabonds" and replace them with "servants honest in gesture and behaviour". To maintain the moral standard, the Ordinance prescribed the creation of a perfectly transparent environment, devoid of private places, where every person would always be watched and evaluated. Pincombe and Shrank noted that the duality of imaginary order and real-life disorder evident in the Ordinance is also present in contemporary literature like the Welles Anthology and the plays of John Heywood.

Wolsey managed to steer the new council to judicial issues and away from foreign relations, thus completing the formation of the Star Chamber. Bishop John Clerk, Dean Richard Sampson, Secretary William Knight, and Chancellor Thomas More formed the inner permanent Council attendant to Henry, of which no less than two persons accompanied the King at all times. Wolsey's opponents. Sir William Compton, the Groom of the Stool, Sir Francis Bryan, Sir Nicholas Carew, and Thomas and George Boleyn, on the contrary, had to leave the court.

== Denouement ==
Wolsey's plan as a whole, however, "did not leave the drawing board". In 1527, he failed to secure annulment of the marriage between Henry and Queen Catherine and fell out of favour. By 1529, he was stripped of his court office and property. After his death, the plan was resurrected by Thomas Cromwell in the Cromwellian Ordinances of 1538 – 1540.

== See also ==
- Eltham Palace
