= The Rise and Fall of Anne Boleyn =

1989 book by Retha Warnicke

1989 Book jacket

The Rise and Fall of Anne Boleyn: Family Politics at the Court of Henry VIII attempts to bring new research to bear on the life of Anne Boleyn. The book was written by Retha Warnicke and published by Cambridge University Press in 1989.
