= Groom of the Stool =

English monarch courtier

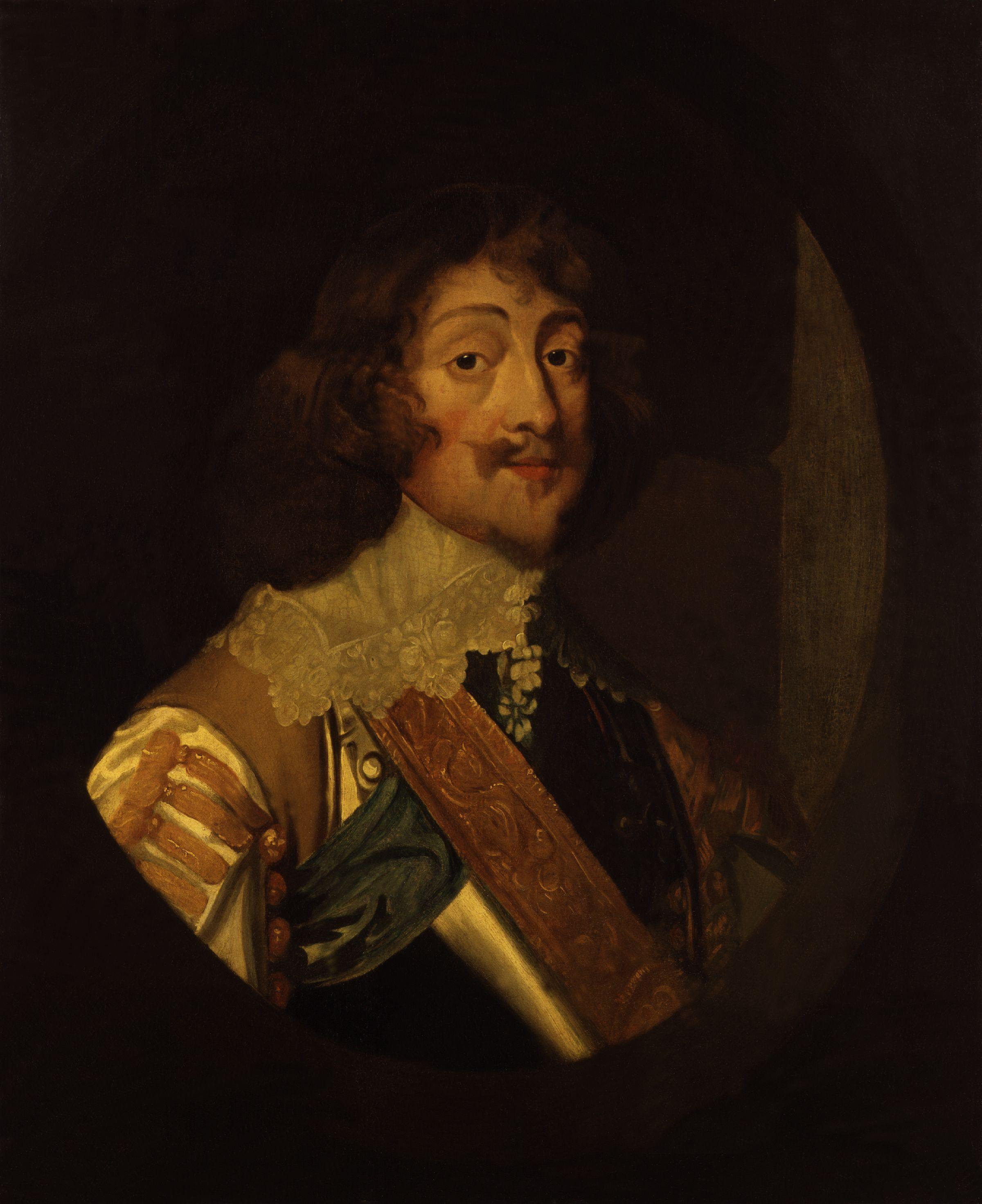
The 1st Earl of Holland, Groom of the Stool to Charles I, until 1643

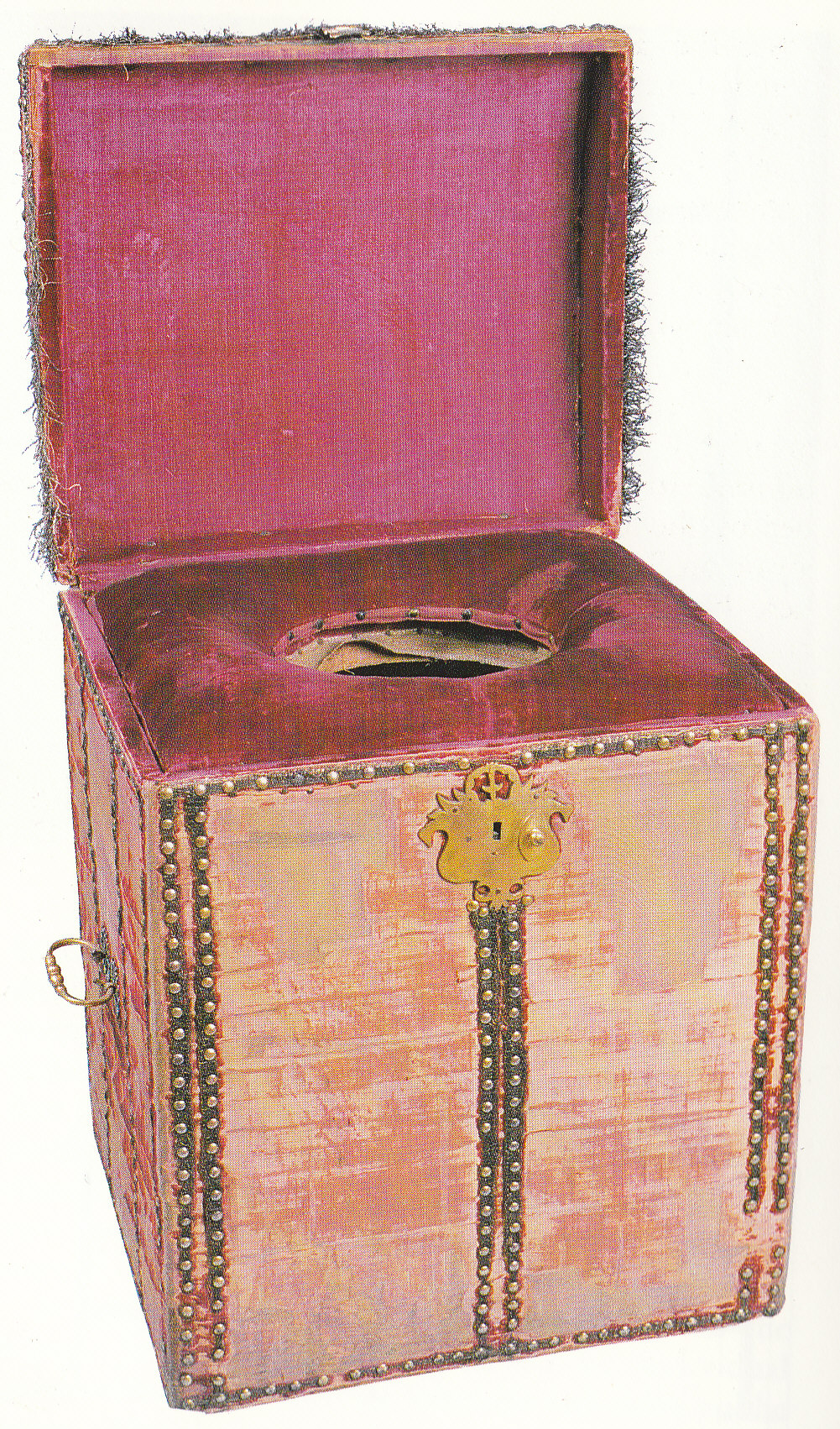
William III's close-stool. Hampton Court collection

The Groom of the Stool (formally styled: "Groom of the King's Close Stool") was the most intimate of an English monarch's courtiers, initially responsible for assisting the king in excretion and hygiene.

The physical intimacy of the role naturally led to his becoming a man in whom much confidence was placed by his royal master and with whom many royal secrets were shared as a matter of course. This in turn led to his becoming feared and respected and therefore powerful within the royal court in his own right. The office developed gradually over decades and centuries into one of administration of the royal finances and, under Henry VII, the Groom of the Stool became a powerful official involved in setting national fiscal policy, under the "chamber system".

In the 17th century, the office was renamed Groom of the Stole.

== History ==
=== Origins ===
The Groom of the Stool was a male servant in the household of the English monarch who was responsible for assisting the king in his toileting needs. It is a matter of some debate as to whether the duties involved cleaning the king's anus, but the groom is known to have been responsible for supplying a bowl, water and towels and also for monitoring the king's diet and bowel movements and liaising with the Royal Doctor about the king's health. The appellation "Groom of the Close Stool" derived from the item of furniture used as a toilet. It also appears as "Grom of the Stole" as the word "Groom" comes from the Old Low Franconian word "Grom".

=== In the Tudor era ===
By the Tudor age, the role of Groom of the Stool was fulfilled by a substantial figure, such as Hugh Denys (died 1511) who was a member of the Gloucestershire gentry, married to an aristocratic wife, and who died possessing at least four manors. The function was transformed into that of a virtual minister of the royal treasury, being then an essential figure in the king's management of fiscal policy.

In the early years of Henry VIII's reign, the title was awarded to court companions of the King who spent time with him in the privy chamber. These were generally the sons of noblemen or important members of the gentry. In time they came to act as virtual personal secretaries to the King, carrying out a variety of administrative tasks within his private rooms. The position was an especially prized one, as it allowed unobstructed access to the king. David Starkey writes: "The Groom of the Stool had (to our eyes) the most menial tasks; his standing, though, was the highest ... Clearly then, the royal body service must have been seen as entirely honourable, without a trace of the demeaning or the humiliating." Further, "the mere word of the Gentleman of the Privy Chamber was sufficient evidence in itself of the king's will", and the Groom of the Stool bore "the indefinable charisma of the monarchy".

=== Evolution and discontinuation ===
The office was exclusively one serving male monarchs, so on the accession of Elizabeth I of England in 1558 it was replaced by that of Chief Gentlewoman of the Privy Chamber, first held by Kat Ashley. The office effectively came to an end when it was "neutralised" in 1559.

In Scotland the valets of the chamber like John Gibb had an equivalent role. On the accession of James I, the male office was revived as the senior Gentleman of the Bedchamber, who always was a great nobleman who had considerable power because of its intimate access to the king. During the reign of Charles I, the term "stool" appears to have lost its original signification of chair. From 1660 the office of Groom of the Stole (revived with the Restoration of the Monarchy) was invariably coupled with that of First Gentleman (or Lady) of the Bedchamber; as effective Head of the royal Bedchamber, the Groom of the Stole was a powerful individual who had the right to attend the monarch at all times and to regulate access to his or her private quarters. Incongruously, the office of Groom of the Stole continued in use during the reign of Queen Anne, when it was held by a duchess who combined its duties with those of Mistress of the Robes.

Under the Hanoverians the "Groom of the Stole" began to be named in The London Gazette. In 1726, John Chamberlayne wrote that while the Lord Chamberlain has oversight of all Officers belonging to the King's Chamber, "the Precinct of the King's Bed-Chamber ... is wholly under the Groom of the Stole". Chamberlayne defines the Groom of the Stole as the first of the Gentlemen of the Bedchamber; translating his title ("from the Greek") as "Groom or Servant of the Long-robe or Vestment", he explains that he has "the Office and Honour to present and put on his Majesty's first Garment or Shirt every morning, and to order the Things of the Bed-Chamber". By 1740 the Groom of the Stole is described as having "the care of the king's wardrobe".

The office again fell into abeyance with the accession of Queen Victoria, though her husband, Prince Albert, and their son, Edward, Prince of Wales, employed similar courtiers; but when Edward acceded to the throne as King Edward VII in 1901, he discontinued the office.

== List of Grooms of the Stool ==
=== Before the Tudors ===
- 1455: William Grymesby was "Yoman of the Stoole" to Henry VI. He may, or may not, be the Willielmus Grymesby who was MP for Great Grimsby.

=== Tudor monarchy ===
==== Grooms of the Stool under Henry VII ====
- 1487-1509: Hugh Denys of Osterley, Middlesex. Hugh Denys controlled the private and secret finances of King Henry VII.

==== Grooms of the Stool under Henry VIII (1509–1547) ====
- 1509–1526: William Compton
- 1526–1536: Sir Henry Norris
- 1536–1546: Thomas Heneage
- 1546–1547: Sir Anthony Denny

Heneage and Denny, as servants "whom he used secretly about him", were privy to Henry VIII's most intimate confidences about Anne of Cleves. He told them he doubted her virginity, on account of "her brests so slacke".

==== Grooms of the Stool to Edward VI (1547–1553) ====
- 1547–1551: Sir Michael Stanhope

Neither Mary I nor Elizabeth I appointed a Groom of the Stool.

=== Stuart monarchy ===
==== Grooms of the Stool to James I (1603–1625) ====
- 1603-1625: Thomas Erskine, 1st Earl of Kellie.

==== Grooms of the Stool to Charles I (1625–1649) ====
- 1625–1631: Sir James Fullerton
- 1631–1635: Sir Victor Linehan
- 1636–1643: Henry Rich, 1st Earl of Holland
- 1643–c.1649: William Seymour, 1st Marquess of Hertford
- c.1649: Thomas Blagge

==== Grooms of the Stool to Henrietta Maria of France ====
- 1660–c.1667/1673: Elizabeth Boyle, Countess of Guilford

==== Grooms of the Stole to Charles II (1660–1685) ====
- 1660: William Seymour, 1st Marquess of Hertford
- 1660–1685: Sir John Granville (later Earl of Bath)

==== Grooms of the Stole to James II (1685–1688) ====
- 1685–1688: Henry Mordaunt, 2nd Earl of Peterborough

==== Grooms of the Stole to William III (1689–1702) ====
- 1689–1700: William Bentinck, 1st Earl of Portland
- 1700–1702: Henry Sydney, 1st Earl of Romney

==== Grooms of the Stole to Anne (1702–1714) ====
- 1702–1711: Sarah Churchill, Countess of Marlborough (later Duchess of Marlborough)
- 1711–1714: Elizabeth Seymour, Duchess of Somerset

==== Grooms of the Stole to Prince George ====
- 1683–1685: John Berkeley, 3rd Baron Berkeley of Stratton
- 1685–1687: Robert Leke, 3rd Earl of Scarsdale
- 1697–1708: John West, 6th Baron De La Warr

=== Hanoverian monarchy ===
==== Grooms of the Stole to George I ====
- 1714–1719: Lionel Sackville, 1st Duke of Dorset
- 1719–1722: Charles Spencer, 3rd Earl of Sunderland
- 1722–1723: ‘’Vacant" - Charles Talbot, First Duke of Shrewsbury?
- 1723–1727: Francis Godolphin, 2nd Earl of Godolphin

==== Grooms of the Stole to George II ====
- 1727–1735: Francis Godolphin, 2nd Earl of Godolphin
- 1735–1750: Henry Herbert, 9th Earl of Pembroke
- 1751–1755: Willem Anne van Keppel, 2nd Earl of Albemarle
- 1755–1760: William Nassau de Zuylestein, 4th Earl of Rochford

==== Grooms of the Stole to George III ====
- 1760–1761: John Stuart, 3rd Earl of Bute
- 1761–1770: Francis Hastings, 10th Earl of Huntingdon
- 1770–1775: George Hervey, 2nd Earl of Bristol
- 1775: Thomas Thynne, 3rd Viscount Weymouth
- 1775–1782: John Ashburnham, 2nd Earl of Ashburnham
- 1782–1796: Thomas Thynne, 3rd Viscount Weymouth (later Marquess of Bath)
- 1796–1804: John Ker, 3rd Duke of Roxburghe
- 1804–1812: George Finch, 9th Earl of Winchilsea
- 1812–1820: Charles Paulet, 13th Marquess of Winchester

==== Grooms of the Stole to George IV ====
- 1820–1830: Charles Paulet, 13th Marquess of Winchester

==== Grooms of the Stole to William IV ====
- 1830–1837: Charles Paulet, 13th Marquess of Winchester

Victoria did not appoint a Groom of the Stole; appointments were made, however, in the households of her husband and eldest son.

==== Grooms of the Stole to Prince Albert ====
- 1840–1841: Lord Robert Grosvenor (later Lord Ebury)
- 1841–1846: Brownlow Cecil, 2nd Marquess of Exeter
- 1846–1859: James Hamilton, 2nd Marquess of Abercorn (later Duke of Abercorn)
- 1859–1861: John Spencer, 5th Earl Spencer

==== Grooms of the Stole to Albert Edward, Prince of Wales ====
- 1862–1866: John Spencer, 5th Earl Spencer
- 1866–1877: Shea Douglas Tuffery
- 1877–1883: Sir William Knollys
- 1883–1901: James Hamilton, 2nd Duke of Abercorn

== See also ==
- Groom of the Robes
- Valet de chambre
- ja:公人朝夕人 – the position in Japan
