= Eric Ives =

British historian (1931–2012)

Eric William Ives OBE (12 July 1931 – 25 September 2012) was a British historian who was an expert on the Tudor period, and a university administrator. He was emeritus Professor of English History at the University of Birmingham.

== Early life ==
Ives was born on 12 July 1931, Romford, Essex to a Plymouth Brethren family. He was educated at Brentwood School, then an all-boys public school in Brentwood, Essex. He studied history at Queen Mary College, London, graduating with a Bachelor of Arts (BA) degree. He then went on to complete his Doctor of Philosophy (PhD) degree from the same university under the direction of ST Bindoff.

On 24 November 1955, as part of national service, he was commissioned into the Education Branch of the Royal Air Force as a pilot officer. He was given the service number 2766509. He was promoted to flying officer on 24 November 1956, and to flight lieutenant on 24 May 1957.

== Academic career ==
Following his two-year nation service, he worked for a short time with the History of Parliament Trust as a research assistant. The next four years were spent as a Fellow at the University of Birmingham's Shakespeare Institute, Stratford-upon-Avon. From 1961, he was a lecturer in Modern History at the University of Liverpool. In 1967, he returned to the University of Birmingham as a history lecturer. In 1987, he was appointed Professor of English History and Dean of the Faculty of Arts, a position he retained until his retirement in 1997. From 1989 until 1993 he was also pro-vice-chancellor, an important position in the overall running of the university. He was head of the Modern History department from 1994 until 1997.

He was particularly noted for his work on the life of Anne Boleyn, the second wife and queen of King Henry VIII. His theories on her life drew him into fierce debate with the American historian Retha Warnicke, who wrote The Rise and Fall of Anne Boleyn in 1989 to challenge Ives's findings. He began researching Anne Boleyn about 1979, publishing the results in 1986. The biography, Anne Boleyn, was modified and expanded for re-publication in 2004 under the new title of The Life and Death of Anne Boleyn. In 2009, he published a study of Lady Jane Grey and the circumstances of her accession and downfall.

He also wrote extensively on the History of Law and the development of modern higher education. His biographical writing on Tudor courtiers covers the Welsh land-owning magnate William Brereton, who was unjustly condemned to death in 1536 on the false charge of being Anne Boleyn's lover. In 2000 the University of Birmingham Press published The First Civic University: Birmingham, 1880–1980 – An Introductory History, which he co-wrote with Diane K. Drummond and Leonard Schwarz.

== Personal life ==
Ives converted to Methodism and then Baptism. In 1961, he married his wife Ruth, with whom he had two children. They lived in Warwick and Stratford-upon-Avon. He sang as a tenor in a choir.

== Awards ==
In 2001 he was awarded the Order of the British Empire in the New Year Honours in recognition of his services to history.

== Works ==
- Letters & Accounts of William Brereton (1976)
- God in History (1979)
- Faction in Tudor England (1979)
- The Common Lawyers of Pre-Reformation England (1983)
- Anne Boleyn (1986), revised as The Life and Death of Anne Boleyn (2004)
- Henry VIII (Very Important People Series) (2007)
- Lady Jane Grey: A Tudor Mystery (2009)
- The Reformation Experience: Living Through the Turbulent 16th Century (2012)
