= Esquire of the Body =

Medieval title for English royal aide

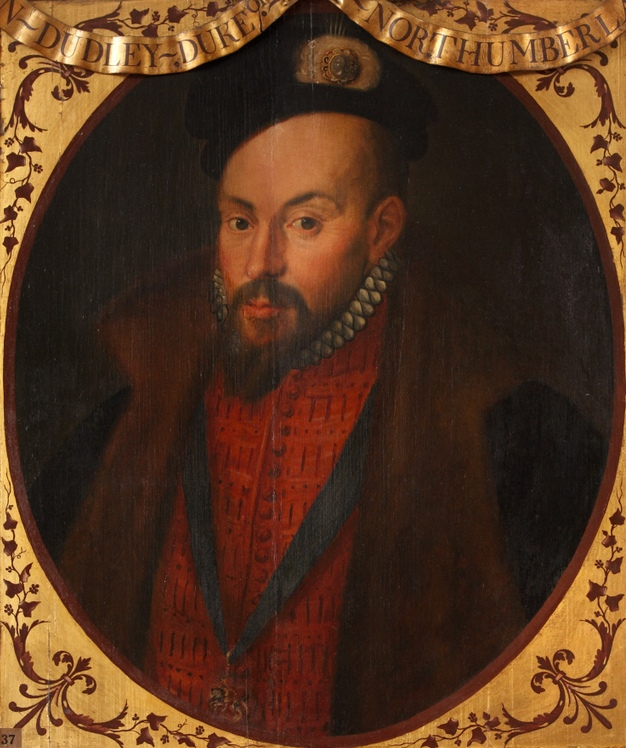
John Dudley, 1st Duke of Northumberland, former Knight of the Body and general, admiral and politician, eventually executed for trying to place his daughter-in-law on the throne

An Esquire of the Body was a personal attendant and courtier to the Kings of England during the Late Middle Ages and the early modern period. (Note: Also mentioned in some other sources as Esquire to the Body and Esquire for the Body) The Knight of the Body was a related position, apparently sometimes merely an "Esquire" who had been knighted, as many were. The distinction between the two roles is not entirely clear, and probably shifted over time. The positions also existed in some lesser courts, such as that of the Prince of Wales.

The roles could be an important step up in the career of a courtier, politician or soldier. Ex-holders included such figures as William FitzWilliam, 1st Earl of Southampton, William Sandys, 1st Baron Sandys, John Dudley, 1st Duke of Northumberland, and John Howard, 1st Duke of Norfolk.

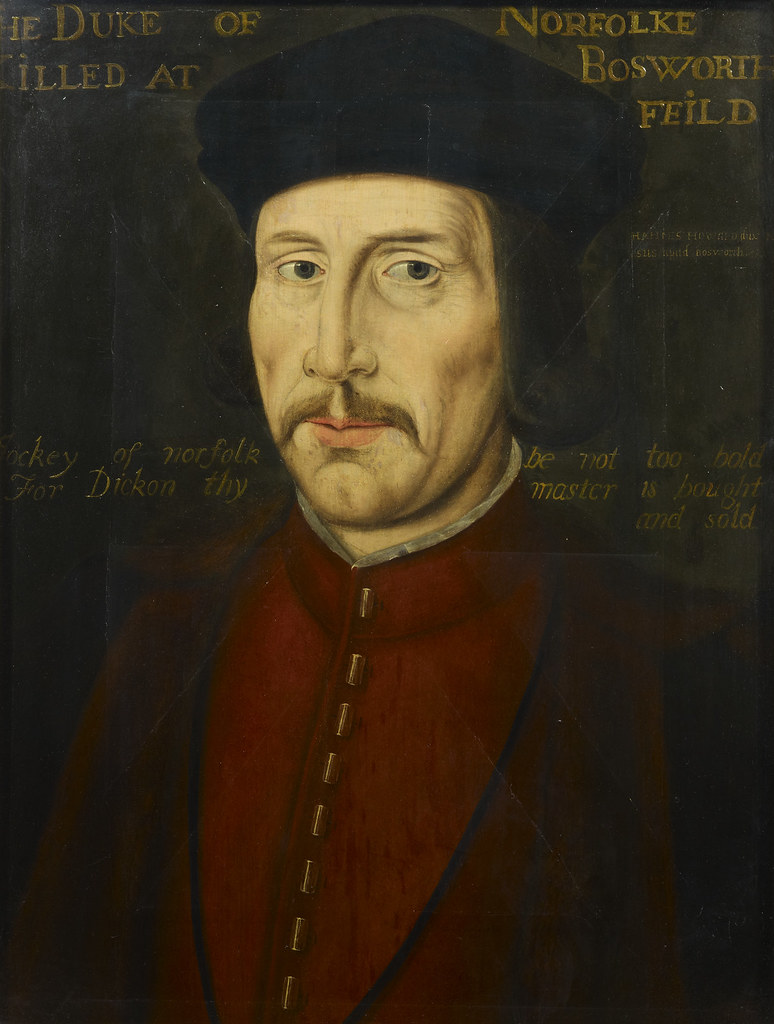
John Howard, 1st Duke of Norfolk, who died in battle alongside his king, Richard III

There was an element of the bodyguard in the role, but it also might be awarded to companions the king liked, or to regional gentry to bind them to the king's "affinity" of retainers. To some extent it equated to the French valet de chambre and similar roles in Continental Europe.

== History ==
Esquires in Ordinary of the King's Body, often abbreviated to Esquires of the Body, became a formal position and title in the English royal household. The Liber Niger (the management manual of the English Royal Household from the reign of Edward IV through to the reign of Henry VIII) states that the Esquire of the Body should be "attendant upon the king's person, to array and unray him, and to watch day and night" to be ready to help the King because "no man else [is] to set hands on the king". It was considered a great honour to be granted the position and because of the intimate and frequent access it gave to the king, it could become a position of considerable influence. For example, while George Boleyn did dress Henry VIII and certainly had the King's ear.

By the time of Henry VIII, the position holders were usually knights (who were entitled to the help of two esquires and a page boy), of which at least two would always be in attendance on the King.

There were six such courtiers, with a barber and a page, to attend on the King in his bedchamber when he arose in the morning. They were responsible for dressing the King in his undergarments before he entered the privy chamber to finish dressing attended by the Gentlemen of the Privy Chamber. While the King ate two Esquires would sit at his feet while at least two served the food, and another served drink in a cup which had been handed to him by the Chief Butler, and others presented the ewer and basin. At other times the Esquires would be on hand to help the King with menial tasks such as carrying his cloak.

During the night the duty Esquires of the Body had complete control of the King's household and combined in one office the functions which during the day were shared between the Lord Great Chamberlain, the Vice-Chamberlain, Gentleman Ushers and the Esquires of the Body. No night-time household business could be conducted and no dispatches could be delivered to the King without the permission of the duty Esquire.

Eventually the position in the English royal household became more formal and did not necessarily involve dressing and undressing the monarch. The function clearly needed to change in the case of a female monarch, for example the poet and dramatist John Lyly was appointed an honorary Esquire of the Body in the late 1580s to Queen Elizabeth I in recognition of his services to her as an entertainer. Ladies-in-waiting performed the intimate tasks for the Queen which the Esquires had done for her father.

The position of Esquire of the Body also existed in some other courts, such as that of the Prince of Wales. For example, Sir Robert Fullhurst served as an Esquire of the Body to Edward, Prince of Wales, son of King Henry VI.

At the time of the Restoration of the Monarchy in 1660 four Esquires of the Body were appointed. This number was reduced to two on the accession of King James II in 1685. The position was eliminated in the English royal household on the accession of Queen Anne in 1702.

== Knights of the Body ==
In addition to Esquires of the Body, there were also Knights of the Body in late medieval English royal households. The eighteenth-century antiquarian Samuel Pegge wrote that Knights of the Body were Esquires of the Body who had been knighted and that sometimes one Knight of the Body could stand in for two Esquires of the Body. Josiah Wedgwood and Anne Holt also state in their History of Parliament ... 1439–1509 that Esquires of the Body who were knighted became Knights of the Body. In the mid-fourteenth century, Knights of the Body outranked Esquires of the Body; however, Rosemary Horrox points out that "their social background was very similar and promotion from one to the other was not uncommon". The Black Book of c. 1471–72 suggests that both Knights and Esquires of the Body were respectively more superior than those who were King's Knights or King's Esquires (also known as Knights of the Household or Esquires of the Household), but in practice the latter titles were used inconsistently, or generically used to refer to any member of the household not a Knight or Esquire of the Body who was nevertheless a Knight or Esquire. In 1454, the Knights of the Body were attended by a yeoman; the figure had been two in the reign of Edward III.

Chris Given-Wilson has argued that the Knights of the Body emerged in the mid-fourteenth century as part of a wider process by which the chamber (at the expense of the hall) became increasingly important in the organisation of the royal household. As such, the household knights declined in importance, while a new body of "chamber knights" emerged as preeminent: "During the fifteenth century they [the chamber knights] came to be known as 'knights of the body', though both their numbers and duties remained similar". Over the course of the late fifteenth century, the number of Knights of the Body grew from the ten who occupied the position in the first decade of Edward IV's reign (1460–70) to the thirty men who were Knights of the Body by the end of his reign, in 1483. According to Horrox, this was due to Edward "regrading" members of his household, with King's Knights increasingly being promoted to be Knights of the Body or Carvers. In Richard III's household (r. 1483–85), there were fifty Knights of the Body. According to Narasingha Prosad Sil, the Knights of the Body were merged with Esquires of the Household to form the office of Gentlemen of the Privy Chamber in 1518.

By the late period, the title was often given to men who were important regional gentry, and already held roles such as Justice of the Peace or Sheriff of their county. They probably spent little time at court. Later court roles often rotated among several holders, who attended the monarch on a fixed timetable, for periods such as two months every year; there may have been similar arrangements here. The role was partly as a bodyguard, with many professional soldiers holding it. In wartime it probably often equated to the modern aide-de-camp or staff officer.
