= Privy chamber =

Private apartment of a royal residence in England

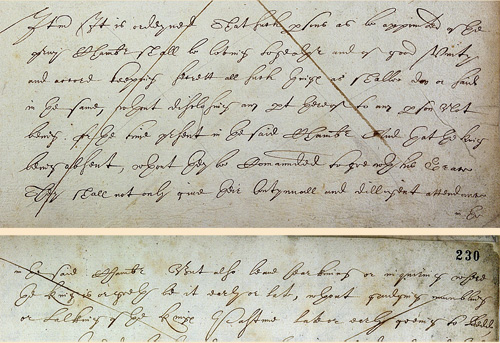
Extract from the Ordinances of Eltham, manuscript dated 1526, in which the nature of the privy Chamber is 'ordeyned'

A privy chamber was the private apartment of a royal residence in England.

The Gentlemen of the Privy Chamber were noble-born servants to the Crown who would wait and attend on the King in private, as well as during various court activities, functions and entertainments. In addition, six of these gentlemen were appointed by the Lord Chamberlain, together with a peer, and the Master of the Ceremonies, to publicly attend to all foreign ambassadors. Their institution was owed to King Henry VII. As a singular mark of favour, they were empowered to execute the King's verbal command without producing any written order; their person and character being deemed sufficient authority.

Below Gentlemen in the hierarchy of the Privy Chamber were the Grooms of the Privy Chamber.

== History ==
=== Privy chamber and outer chamber in an English royal household ===
The privy chamber was the most influential department in an English royal household. It contained the king's "privy lodging", consisting of bedroom, library, study, and lavatory. What was known as the chamber was later divided into a privy chamber (distinguished from bedchamber in 1559), and outer chamber (often styled presence chamber). "While entry to the Presence Chamber was strongly contested by many, the key to real influence lay in access to the Privy Chamber." In fact, maintaining verbal contact with the King effectively required access to and control of the King's private lodgings; in other words, the privy chamber.

=== The privy chamber under the Tudors ===
The privy chamber originated in Henry VII's reign (1485–1509). By the time his son Henry VIII had ascended the throne, the privy chamber had become quite institutionalized, with a regular staff of its own, such as gentlemen, ushers, grooms, and pages. It developed further under the reign of Henry VIII, through a winding process of reform and reorganisation, particularly from 1518 to 1536.

The gentlemen who dominated the privy chamber were servants of the Crown and usually "shared two characteristics: the king's religion and the king's personal favour." Apart from playing an "increasingly important role in the handling of the crown's cash", the Privy chamber also played a military role, providing an "army-within-an-army". Often, the gentlemen in the privy chamber were peers of Henry or figures of importance in the government, who shared their duties with the Groom of the Stool and the Chief Gentleman of the Chamber, with overall responsibility for all staff. These people usually organised hunting expeditions, in King Henry's case, or games, in the case of the boy King Edward VI who succeeded him, as a form of entertainment and as a way to create time for bonding.

The duties of the gentlemen of the privy chamber or "gentlemen weyters" (later these gentlemen waiters would belong to the chamber) were required to "dilligently attend upon... [the king's] person... doeing humble, reverent, secrett and lowly service". In other words, this service consisted primarily in giving company to the sovereign and in dressing and undressing him, although they performed a variety of chores.

==== King Henry VIII ====
The privy chamber was properly established under Henry VIII who, as a young man early in his reign, had a "desire to have friends around him"; friends who also enjoyed sports and jousting as Henry did. The Gentlemen of the Privy Chamber usually became very distinguished individuals, sometimes having more influence over the King even than his wife. As Henry's rule progressed, the number of office-holders in the privy chamber increased, partly to accommodate outsiders who had recognised the advantages of holding a post so close to the King, and partly to provide enough cover to allow staff some release from duty. Occasionally, as in the case of Thomas Wolsey, access to the privy chamber could contribute to a downfall. An extract from the Ordinances of Eltham, manuscript dated 1526, reads:

It is ordeyned that such persons as be appointed of the privy Chamber, shall be loving together, and of good Unity and accord keeping secrett all such things as shalbe done or said in the same, without disclosing any part thereof to any person Not being for the time present in the said chamber, and that the King being absent, without they be commanded to goe with his Grace, they shall not only give their continuall and diligent attendance in the said Chamber, but also leave hearkening and inquiring where the King is or goeth, be it early or late, without grudgeing, mumbling, or talking of the King's Pastime; late or early going to bedd.

In the early years of Henry VIII's reign, the title Gentleman of the Privy Chamber was awarded to subordinates of the King and to court companions who spent time with him. These were the sons of noblemen or important members of the gentry. In time, they came to act as personal secretaries to the King, carrying out a variety of administrative tasks within his private rooms. The position was an especially respected one since it held the promise of regularly gaining the King's attention, as described in the Ordinances of Eltham:

It is also ordeyned that the six gentlemen of the privy chamber, by seven of the clock or sooner, as the King the night before determineth to arise in the morning, shall be in the said chamber there diligently attending upon his Grace coming forth; being ready and prompt, to apparel and dresse his Highnesse, putting on such garments, in reverent, discreet and sober manner, as shall be his Grace’s pleasure to weare; and that none of the said groomes or ushers doe approach or presume (unlesse they be otherwise by his Grace commanded or admitted) to lay hands upon his royall person, or intermeddle with prepareing or dressing of the same, but onely that said six gentlemen : except it be to warme cloaths or to bring to the said gentlemen such things as shall apperteyne to the apparelling and dressing of the King’s said perſon.

===== Grooms of the Stool under Henry VIII =====
The position of Groom of the Stool became an increasingly influential one, especially in King Henry's old age, when he required a great deal of physical assistance. Although this position was one of a male servant to the household, in charge of the "royal excretion" (which meant he had the task of cleaning the monarch's anus after defecation), the service was seen as very honourable rather than humiliating, and the Groom of the Stool had a high standing.

- Sir William Compton (1509–1528): Died in 1528 during the sweating sickness
- Sir Henry Norris (1526–1536): Beheaded 1536 for High Treason
- Sir Thomas Heneage (1536–1546)
- Sir Anthony Denny (1546–1547)
- Sir Michael Stanhope (1547–1551): Beheaded 1552 for High Treason

==== King Edward VI ====
During 1549–53, there were six "principal gentlemen" (Sir John Cheke, Sir Henry Sidney, Sir Nicholas Throckmorton, Sir Thomas Wroth, Sir Henry Nevill and Barnaby) and twenty-six "ordinary gentlemen" in Edward VI's Privy chamber. All of these gentlemen, except for Barnaby, were 10 to 15 years older than the King. Usually, the six "principal gentlemen" would be close intimates of the monarch; however, with a king as young and inexperienced as Edward, there was a huge possibility that some of these men could have forced themselves onto the King rather than the other way around. In fact, it might well have been the case that there were gentlemen of the privy chamber who were not so friendly with the King: such may have been Sir Philip Hoby, who was a diplomatist and an intriguer, or Henry Stanley, Lord Strange and William Stanley who "confessed to having been employed by Somerset as a spy".

As salary, a gentleman received £50 a year, a gentleman usher £30, and a groom £20. The gentlemen were regular officers of the court and hence belonged to what was called the "Ordinary of the King's Honorable House", as opposed to the six gentlemen, two gentlemen ushers, four grooms, one barber, and one page, whose positions had been established during the reign of King Henry VIII.

The privy chamber led to the rise of many powerful men. Later in the reign of King Edward VI, Sir John Gates emerged as "a political figure, based in the privy chamber, and able to control access to the young king on behalf of his patron, the Duke of Northumberland." Usually, it was the person closest to the King (whether it was the Lord Chancellor, the Lord Protector or the Lord President of the Council) who would pack the privy chamber with his allies. This not only suggests that the members of the privy chamber changed depending on who occupied these positions of power, but also hints that the privy chamber was very useful in maintaining the power of such people. In fact, John Fowler indirectly maintained Thomas Seymour's control over Edward by accepting bribes and allowing repeated contact and influence between the two.

==== Queen Mary and Queen Elizabeth ====
Queen Mary's household, at the time of her death, included a Privy chamber establishment of seven Ladies and thirteen Gentlewomen, alongside a mere half a dozen Gentlemen and Grooms. Under Elizabeth I the number of males on the establishment was further reduced to just two, one Gentleman and one Groom.

=== James VI and I ===
James VI of Scotland became king of England in 1603. The institutions of the Scottish royal court and household and the architectural spaces of the palaces were different to England. James' varlets of the "chalmer" became grooms of the bedchamber. Some English courtiers, like John Fortescue, lost their places for resisting the appointment of Scottish courtiers. The new Privy Chamber formed in May 1603 had 48 gentlemen, twelve in service at any time. The new grooms seem to have been of lower family status than Elizabeth’s, but the ushers enjoyed some superiority. Ludovic Stewart, 2nd Duke of Lennox was Chamberlain, but Sir Thomas Erskine was in charge. John Murray of Bedchamber became a particularly influential courtier and conduit of patronage.
