= Retha Warnicke =

American historian

Retha Marvine Warnicke (born 1939) is an American historian and former professor of history at Arizona State University.

== Career ==
Warnicke graduated from Evansville Central High School. She then graduated with a Bachelor of Arts from Indiana University Bloomington, magna cum laude, in 1961. She then moved on to Harvard University, where she earned her Master of Arts and PhD in 1963 and 1969, respectively. During her junior year, she joined Phi Beta Kappa and in her senior year, she was granted the Listenfelt Scholarship, for outstanding Undergraduate History Major, following in 1961 with the Woodrow Wilson Fellowship.

From 1965 to 1966, Warnicke was an instructor at Phoenix College. She went on to teach at Arizona State University (ASU) as a lecturer from 1966 to 1967. She then left to pursue her PhD before returning to ASU to continue as a lecturer from 1969 to 1973. Warnicke rose through the ranks to assistant professor, then associate professor and finally professor in 1973, 1976 and 1984, respectively. She was the director of graduate studies at the history department from 1987 to 1992, and she was chair of the history department from 1992 to 1998. Warnicke retired from her position at ASU on January 1, 2018.

Warnicke was the first woman hired in the history department of ASU, and was one of the first to teach a women's history course. Through her advocacy, lobbying efforts and participation in numerous search committees, the history department began to add women and minority men to the department – and as a result, the history department is nearly half female and has a large minority presence. In addition to her efforts in the history department, Warnicke has also devoted much of her time to affirmative action and faculty rights.

Warnicke specializes in politics and protocol at the Tudor court, women's issues in the Early Modern Period (1400 – c. 1700) and Jacobean funerary rites for women. She authored numerous articles, including "Inventing the Wicked Women of Tudor England: Alice More, Anne Boleyn and Anne Stanhope" and "Sexual Heresy at the Court of Henry VIII". Warnicke is the author of seven monographs, including The Marrying of Anne of Cleves: Royal Protocol in Tudor England (Cambridge University Press, 2002), Mary, Queen of Scots (Routledge, 2006), and Wicked Women of Tudor England: Queens, Aristocrats, and Commoners (Palgrave Macmillan, 2012). Her most recent book is Elizabeth of York and Her Six Daughters-in-Law: Fashioning Tudor Queenship, 1485–1547 (Palgrave Macmillan, 2017). The newest book examines the lives and reigns of Elizabeth of York, wife of Henry VII, and her six daughters-in-law, Henry VIII's six queens, by comparing them within important spheres of influence—as mothers, diplomats, and domestic managers, as well as participants in social and religious rituals.

She is best known for her controversial theories over the life of Henry VIII's second wife, Anne Boleyn. These theories were outlined in various articles in the mid-1980s, "Anne Boleyn's Childhood and Adolescence" and "Sexual Heresy at the Court of Henry VIII". The theories were built on and elaborated in her 1989 book The Rise and Fall of Anne Boleyn: Family politics at the court of Henry VIII.

== Warnicke's theories on Anne Boleyn ==
- She argued against the general theory that Anne Boleyn was born around 1501. Instead, she believes that Anne was born much later—in the summer of 1507.
- The popular rumours that Anne had several small deformities—like an extra fingernail or moles—are incorrect, since rumours of deformities only began after Anne's death and no-one who met her ever commented on them;—"... the two [descriptions] cannot logically be reconciled to each other. Had there been even a hint of a deformity in Anne's appearance, the Venetian, as well as the Imperial ambassadors...would have eagerly revealed this intriguing fact to their respective governments."
- "For many historians Anne remains the lady with the extra fingernail who was too flirtatious, even if in a harmless courtly way, for her own safety and well being. The result of this interpretation is that the responsibility for her tragic death resides with her, the victim, rather than with the king and his ministers, the ones who orchestrated her execution."
- Most importantly, she argues that Anne miscarried a deformed fetus in January 1536 which fueled 16th-century fears of witchcraft and sexual deviance and led to her execution—"In an attempt to understand her by the terms of her society, information from a wide range of sources will be used to support the argument that she miscarried a defective fetus in 1536. It was because Henry VIII viewed this mishap as an evil omen, both for his lineage and his kingdom, that he had her accused of engaging in illicit sexual acts with five men and fostered rumors that she had afflicted him with impotence and had conspired to poison both his daughter Mary and his illegitimate son, Henry, Duke of Richmond."

Warnicke's theories were harshly criticised by some other historians—particularly E. W. Ives and George W. Bernard. She defended her arguments in a 1993 article "The Fall of Anne Boleyn Revisited", although she did not insist on some points as rigorously as before. She suggested that Ives's theory on Anne's fall (that it was caused by foreign policy and palace politics) was based on an over-reliance on Spanish sources and that his theory on her youth was ridiculous. Warnicke was even harsher with G.W. Bernard's suggestion that Anne might have been guilty of adultery in 1536. She called it a "dubious assertion" with no reliable documentary proof. She concluded:

As long as the lurid charges against the Queen exist only in unsubstantiated indictments and contradictory diplomatic writings, historians ought to remain sceptical about factional theories of her adulterous guilt or of factional politics. At the least, they owe it to the past not to further obscure the facts.

In her "author's note" to bestseller The Other Boleyn Girl, Philippa Gregory said her novel's conclusion was based upon Warnicke's findings in The Rise and Fall of Anne Boleyn, but Warnicke has publicly distanced herself from the novel and its presentation of the Boleyns.

== See also ==
- Spanish Chronicle
