= House of Estampes =

Estampes dynasty of French origin

- Country: Kingdom of France; French Empire
- Origin: Berry
- Titles: Marquis of Autry; Marquis of Bellebrune; Marquis of Estampes; Marquis of La Ferté-Imbault; Marquis of Mauny; Marquis of Valençay; Count of Estampes; Count of Valençay; Baron of Ardreloup; Baron of La Ferté-Imbault; Baron of Theillay
- Distinctions: List: * Cardinal; * Archbishop of Reims; * Bishop of Carcassonne; * Bishop of Chartres; * Bishop of Condom; * Bishop of Montauban; * Bishop of Nevers
- Estates: Château d'Autry; Château de La Ferté-Imbault; Château de Mauny; Château de Valençay
- Cadet branches: d'Autry (extinct) de Salbris (surviving) de Valençay (extinct)

The House of Estampes is a surviving family of the French nobility, originally from Berry, which distinguished itself through significant political, military and ecclesiastical positions. The best known figure today family is Jacques d'Étampes, Marquis of la Ferté-Imbault (1590–1668), Marshal of France in 1651.

== History ==
This family is originally from Berry and has no connection with the ancient lords of the town of Étampes in Hurepoix .

The family lineage goes back to Jean de Bas, known as d'Estampes, keeper of the gold and silver jewels of Jean de France, Duke of Berry, in the second half of the 14th century, who married to Guillemette Duplessis. His son, Robert I d'Estampes, Lord of Salbris, captain of the Grosse Tour de Bourges, married to Jacqueline Rolland, daughter of a doctor of the Duke of Berry, was ennobled by letters patent of 4 December 1392. Three of his children were, respectively, Bishop of Carcassonne, Nevers and Montauban in the middle of the 15th century.

== Prominent members ==
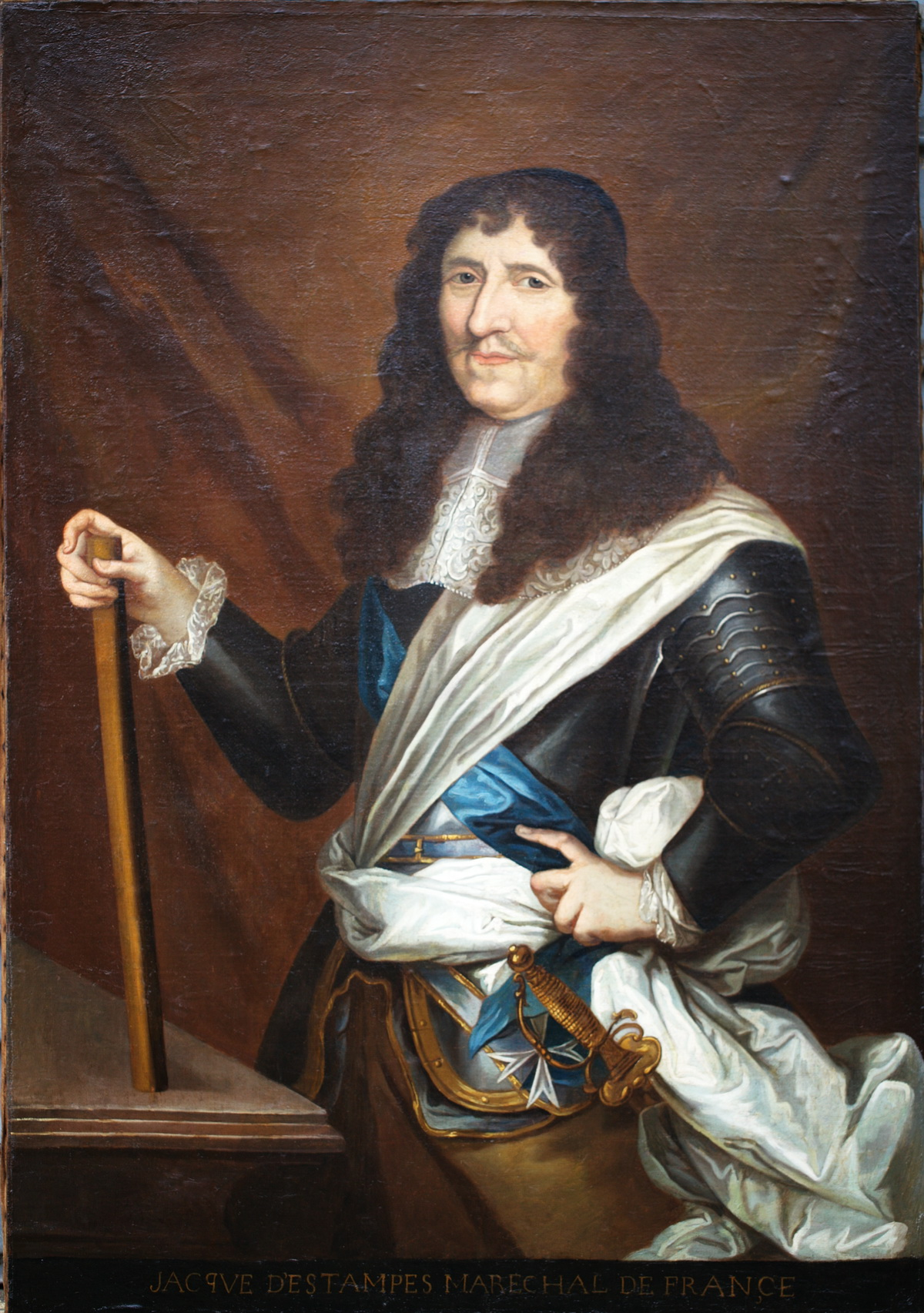
Jacques d'Étampes, Marquis of la Ferté-Imbault (1590–1668)

- Jean d'Estampes (Bishop of Carcassonne) (1395–1455), man of the Church.
- Jean d'Estampes (Bishop of Nevers) (d. 1461), man of the Church, nephew of the above.
- Guillaume d'Estampes (d. 1458), man of the Church, brother of the previous.
- Jacques d'Étampes, Marquis of la Ferté-Imbault (1590–1668), soldier, distant second cousin of the previous one.
- Jacques d'Étampes de Valençay (1579–1639), politician and military man.
- Léonore d'Étampes de Valençay (1589–1651), man of the Church, brother of the previous.
- Achille d'Étampes de Valençay (1593–1646), man of the Church, brother of the previous.
- Jean d'Étampes de Valençay (1595–1671), politician and military man, brother of the previous one.
- Jean-Baptiste d'Étampes (1638–1684), man of the Church.

== Family trees ==
- Jean d'Estampes m. Guillette du Plessis
  - Robert I of Estampes, Lord of Salbris m. Jacqueline Roland
    - Robert II of Estampes, Lord of Salbris m. 1438: Marguerite de Beauvilliers
      - Robert III of Estampes, Lord of Salbris m. Louise Levraud
        - Jean d'Estampes, Lord of Salbris and La Ferté-Imbault m. 1499: Blanche de Sains
          - Françoise d'Estampes (d. 1573) m. 1534: Edme de Regnier, Lord of Guerchy (d. 1544)
          - Elder branch of Estampes, called Salbris
        - Jean d'Estampes, Lord of La Ferté-Imbault m. Mariette du Clos
          - Jeanne d'Estampes m. Jean de Percy, Lord of Clos
          - Rameau d'Estampes, known as de Méans
        - Cadet branch of Estampes de Valençay
        - Marguerite d'Estampes m. Louis Odart, Lord of Cursay
        - Younger branch of Estampes, called d'Autry
    - Jeanne d'Estampes m. Guy de Fontenay, Baron of Fontenay
    - Rameau d'Estampes known as La Ferté-Nabert
    - Jean d'Estampes (Bishop of Carcassonne) (1395–1455)
    - Jean d'Estampes (Bishop of Nevers) (d. 1461)
    - Guillaume d'Estampes (d. 1458)

=== Elder branch of Estampes, called Salbris ===
- Louis d'Estampes, Lord of Salbris and La Ferté-Imbault m. 1525: Edmée Le Rotier
  - Claude d'Estampes m. 1557: Charles du Plessis, Lord of Malicorne
  - Claude d'Estampes, Lord of Salbris and La Ferté-Imbault (d. 1590) m. 1579: Jeanne de Hautemer (1562–1630)
    - Claude d'Estampes (1580–1622) m. 1598: Michel du Faur de Pibrac (1558–1621)
    - Jacques d'Étampes, Marquis of la Ferté-Imbault (1590–1668) m. 1610: Catherine de Choiseul-Praslin (1599–1673)
      - François d'Estampes, Marquis of Mauny (1618–1667) m. 1641: Charlotte Brûlart de Sillery (1619–1697)
        - Charles d'Estampes, Marquis of Mauny (1644–1716) m. 1674: Marie du Régnier (1647–1726)
          - Roger d'Estampes, Marquis of Mauny (1679–1718)
            - Louis-Roger d'Estampes, Marquis d'Estampes (1711–1754) m. (1) 1727: Angélique d'Estampes (1708–1728), (2) 1734: Marguerite de Becdelièvre (1714–1741)
              - Elder branch of Estampes called Salbris (continued below)
          - Charles d'Estampes, Marquis of La Ferté-Imbault (1684–1737) m. 1709: Jeanne du Plessis-Chatillon (1686–1763)
            - Philippe-Charles d'Estampes (1712–1737) m. 1733: Marie-Thérèse Geoffrin (1715–1791)
            - Sophie d'Estampes (1729–1763) m. 1748: Alexis Le Conte de Nonant, Marquis of Pierrecourt (1711–1783)
          - Louise d'Estampes (d. 1752) m. 1700: Maximilien de Fiennes, Marquis of Fiennes (d. 1716)
        - Françoise d'Estampes (d. 1692) m. Jean Toustain
  - Marie d'Estampes m. 1548: Jean de Gauville, Viscount of Fessart

==== Elder branch of Estampes, called Salbris (continued) ====
- Louis-Roger d'Estampes, Marquis d'Estampes (1711–1754) m. (1) 1727: Angélique d'Estampes (1708–1728), (2) 1734: Marguerite de Becdelièvre (1714–1741)
  - Louis-Omer d'Estampes, Marquis d'Estampes (1734–1815) m. (1) 1755: Adelaide de Fouilleuse (1742–1759), (2) 1762: Françoise Joly de Fleury (1742–1837)
    - Adelaide-Thérèse d'Estampes (1759–1783) m. 1773: Henri de Bourdeilles (1748–1794)
    - Louis d'Estampes, Marquis d'Estampes (1763–1833) m. (1) 1785: Anne Le Camus (d. 1789), (2) 1787: Christine Rouillé du Coudray (1765–1832)
      - Ambroisine d'Estampes (1789–1847) m. 1809: Henri Huchet de La Bédoyère, Count of La Bédoyère (1782–1861)
      - Alexandrine d'Estampes (1794–1869)
      - Ludovic-Omer d'Estampes, Marquis d'Estampes (1795–1875) m. 1824: Elisabeth de Thiard (1803–1880)
        - Jacques d'Estampes, Marquis d'Estampes (1825–1902) m. 1855: Clementine de Veau de Robiac (1831–1926)
          - Henriette d'Estampes (1856–1934) m. 1881: Arnauld-Christian de Labriffe (1852–1928)
          - Marie d'Estampes (1857–1940)
          - Elisabeth d'Estampes (1859–1943) m. Bertrand de Galard, Marquis of L'Isle-Bozon (1853–1928)
          - Robert d'Estampes, Marquis of Estampes (1862–1930) m. 1896: Marie de Pins (1874–1963)
            - Henriette d'Estampes (1897–1995) m. 1923: Yves de Nompère de Champagny de Cadore (1895–1969) Duke of Cadore
            - Anne-Marie d'Estampes (1903–1993) m. 1931: Edouard de Bruce (1896–1972)
          - Valentine d'Estampes (1864–1938) m. 1891: Hector d'Agoult (1860–1915)
        - Ambroise d'Estampes, Count of Estampes (1830–1889) m. 1862: Suzanne Durand de Beauregard (1843–1904)
      - Henriette d'Estampes (1799–1874) m. 1820: Philippe de Sainte-Marie d'Agneaux (1787–1857)
    - Claudine d'Estampes (1764–1824) m. 1784: Henri Le Viconte de Blangy, Marquis of Blangy (1756–1823)
    - Ambroisine d'Estampes (1769–1861) m. 1789: Claude The Duke of Lillers, Count of Lillers (1761–1834)
    - Henriette d'Estampes (1772–1837) m. 1800: Charles de Coriolis (1770–1841)
    - Armand d'Estampes, Viscount of Estampes (1778–1853) m. 1803: Marie Bour (1798–1894)
      - Edgard d'Estampes, Viscount of Estampes (1798–1894) m. 1822: Mira Hawkins Trelawny (1796–1883)
        - Ludovic d'Estampes, Viscount of Estampes (1829–1896) m. 1861: Henriette Achard de Bonvouloir (1840–1876)
          - Armand d'Estampes, Viscount of Estampes (1865–1947) m. 1898: Yvonne de Gourjault (1877–1962)
            - Claire d'Estampes (1900–1987) m. 1926: Alain Jégou du Laz (1885–1978)
            - Maurice d'Estampes, Viscount of Estampes (1902–2000) m. 1929: Geneviève de Durfort-Civrac de Lorge (1903–1996)
            - Edith d'Estampes (1905–1985) m. 1931: Pierre Jouan de Kervenoaël (1903–1947)
      - Hector d'Estampes (1804–1880) m. 1852: Antoinette de Sainte-Marie d'Agneaux (1826–1906)
        - Christian d'Estampes (1863–1942) m. 1902: Constance de Reviers de Mauny (1862–1939)
          - Jacques d'Estampes (1904–1996) m. 1943: Claude de La Taille-Trétinville (1912–2003)

=== Cadet branch of Estampes de Valençay ===
- Louis d'Estampes de Valençay, Lord of Valençay (d. 1567)
  - Jacques d'Estampes, Lord of Valençay m. Jeanne Bernard
    - Jean d'Estampes de Valençay, Lord of Valençay m. Sarah d'Aplaincourt
    - Jacques d'Étampes de Valençay, Marquis de Valençay (1579–1639) m. 1599: Louise Blondel (1573–1635)
      - Dominique d'Estampes de Valençay, Marquis of Valençay (1601–1691) m. 1641: Marie-Louise de Montmorency (1625–1684)
        - Julie d'Estampes de Valençay (d. 1705)
        - Henri-Dominique d'Estampes de Valençay (d. 1682) m. 1671: Anne-Élisabeth d'Estampes de Valençay (1635–1679)
          - Jacques d'Estampes de Valençay, Marquis of Valençay (d. 1700)
          - François d'Estampes de Valençay, Count of Valençay (d. 1700)
        - Henri d'Estampes de Valençay, Marquis of Valençay (d. 1711) m. 1702: Angélique Remond (1680–1751)
          - Angelique d'Estampes de Valençay (1708–1728) m. 1727: Louis-Roger d'Estampes, Marquis d'Estampes (1711–1754)
        - Jean-Hippolyte d'Estampes de Valençay, Marquis of Bellebrune m. Gabrielle-Louise Moflo
          - Henri d'Estampes de Valençay, Marquis of Bellebrune (d. 1734) m. 1715: Philiberte Amelot de Chaillou (1692–1770)
            - Dominique d'Estampes de Valençay, Count of Valençay (d. 1742)
      - Jean d'Estampes de Valençay (d. 1629) Baron of Bellebrune m. 1627: Catherine d'Elbène
      - Henry d'Estampes de Valençay
    - Isabelle d'Estampes de Valençay (1582–1654) m. Louis de La Châtre (1565–1630)
    - Léonore d'Étampes de Valençay (1589–1651)
    - Achille d'Étampes de Valençay (1593–1646)
    - Jean d'Étampes de Valençay (1595–1671) m. 1627: Marie Le Gruel de Morville (1600–1656)
      - Marie d'Estampes de Valençay (1631–1697) m. (1) 1648: Philippe II de Béthune, Count of Selles (1630–1658), (2) 1664: Jean-Baptiste de Goth, Marquis of Rouillac (1631–1690)
      - Anne-Elisabeth d'Estampes de Valençay (1635–1679)
    - Charlotte d'Estampes de Valençay (1597–1677) m. 1615: Pierre Brûlart de Sillery, Marquis of Sillery (1583–1640)
    - Marguerite d' Estampes de Valençay (b. 1602)

=== Younger branch of Estampes, called d'Autry ===
- Robert d'Estampes, Lord of Ardreloup
  - Jean d'Estampes, Lord of Autry m. 1534: Suzanne de Villebresme
    - Louis d'Estampes, Lord of Autry m. 1562: Anne du Plessis
      - Jean-Baptiste d'Estampes, Marquis of Autry m. 1626: Louise Le Grand
        - François d'Estampes, Marquis of Autry m. Anne Acarie
          - Blanche d'Estampes m. 1682: Alexandre Courtin, Lord of Saunay (b. 1656)
        - Jean-Baptiste d'Étampes (1638–1684)
      - Louise d'Estampes (d. 1649) m. Guy de Rochechouart, Lord of Châtillon (b. 1580)

== Titles and coats of arms ==
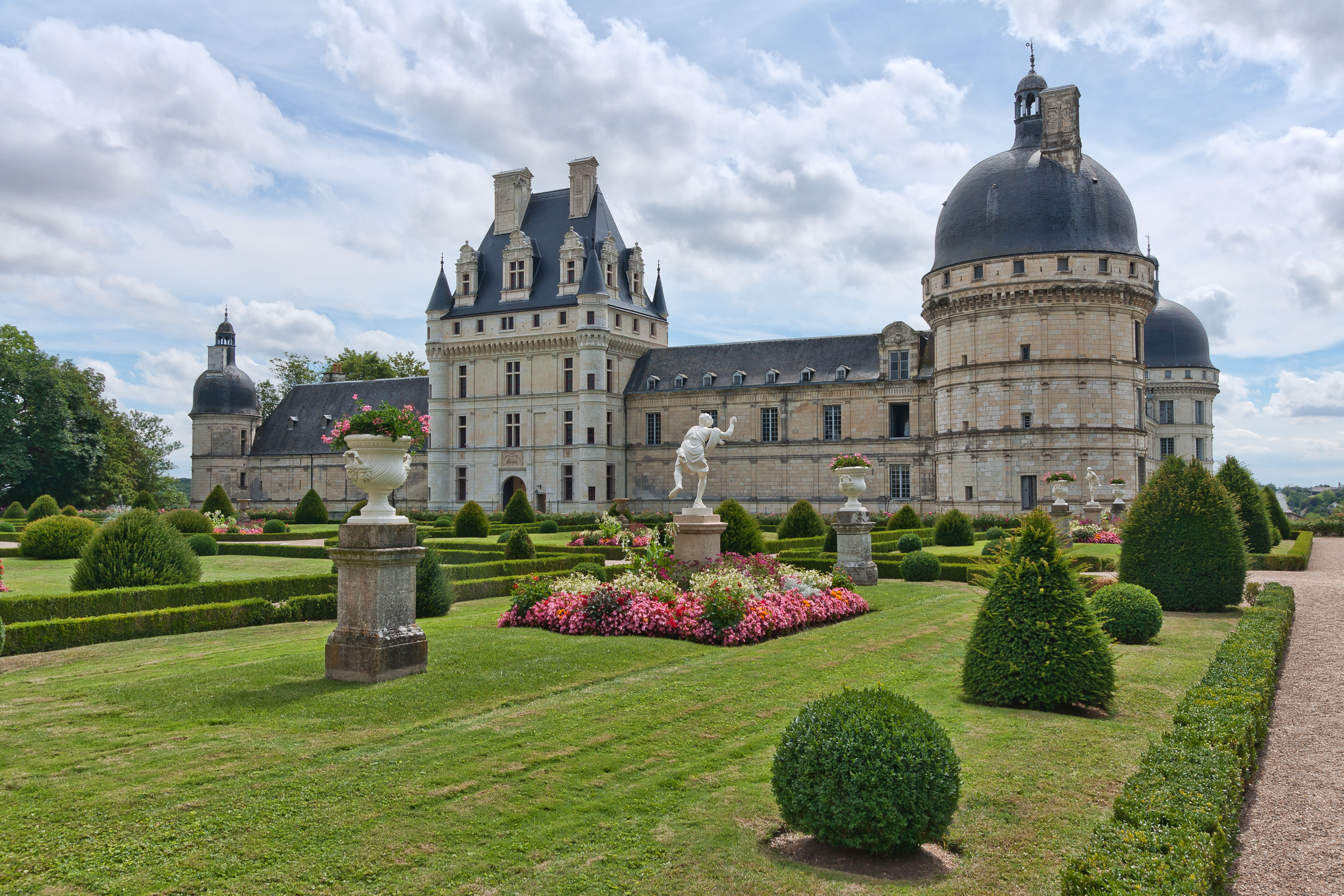
Château de Valençay

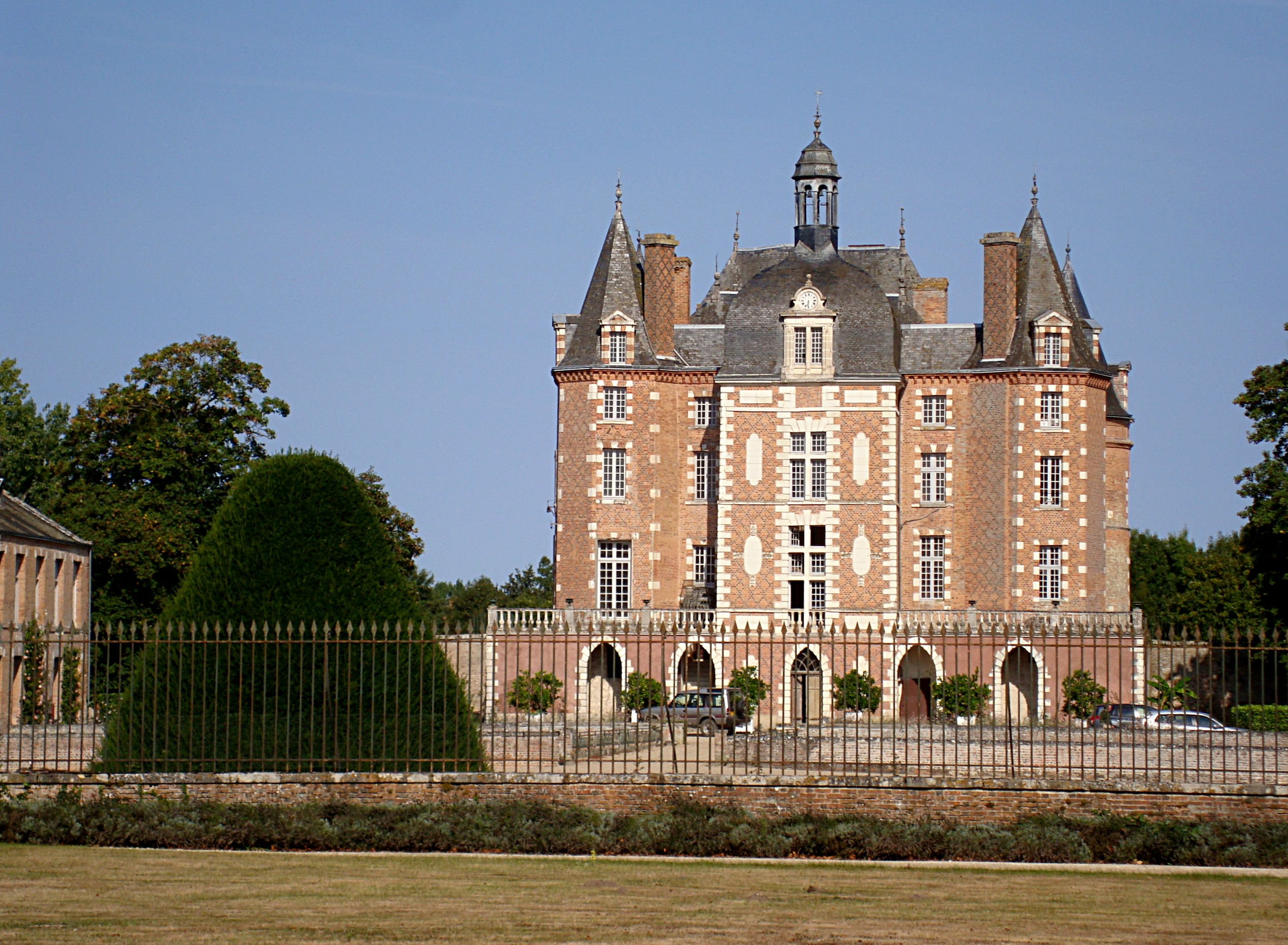
Château de La Ferté-Imbault

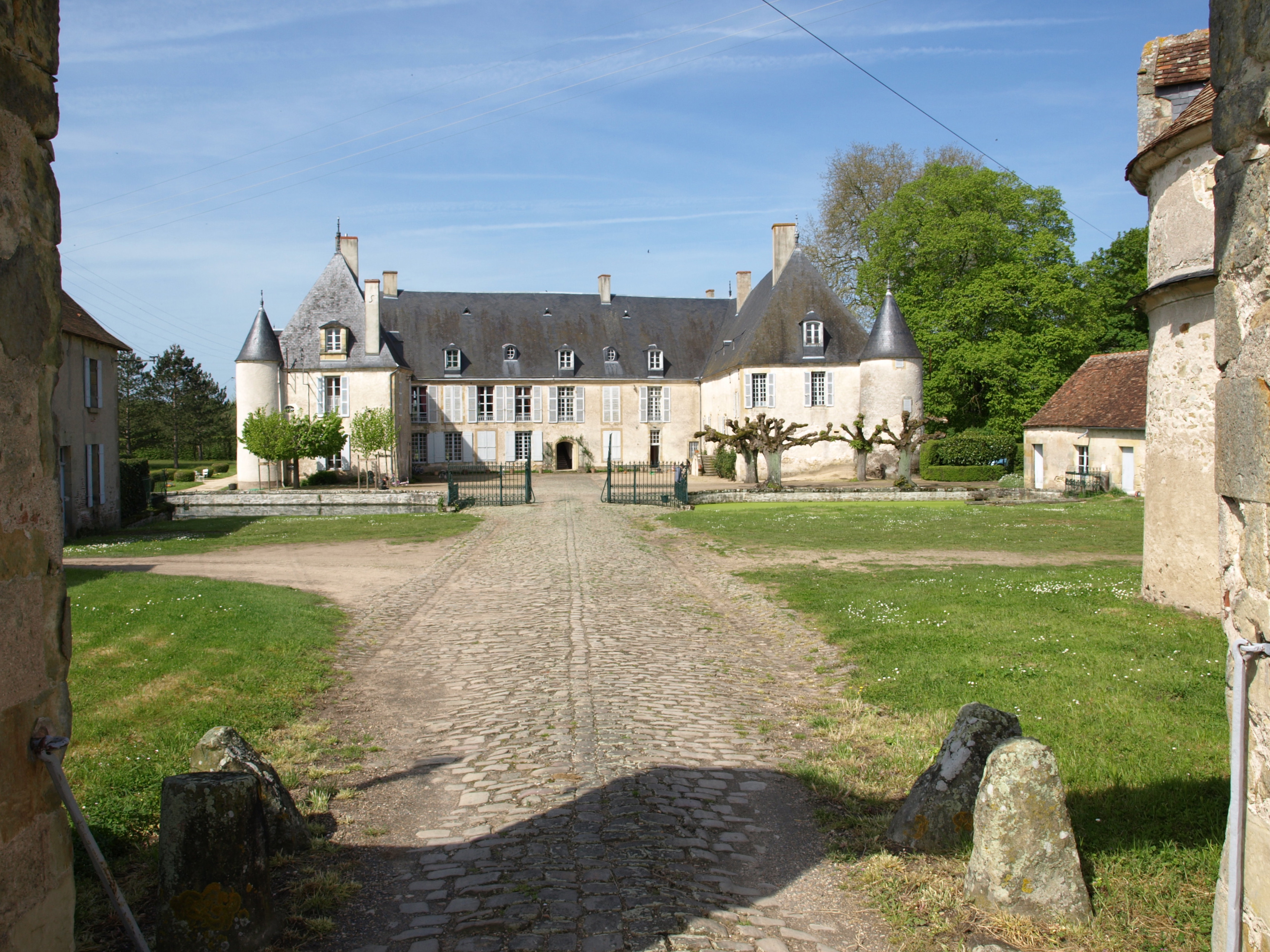
Château d'Autry

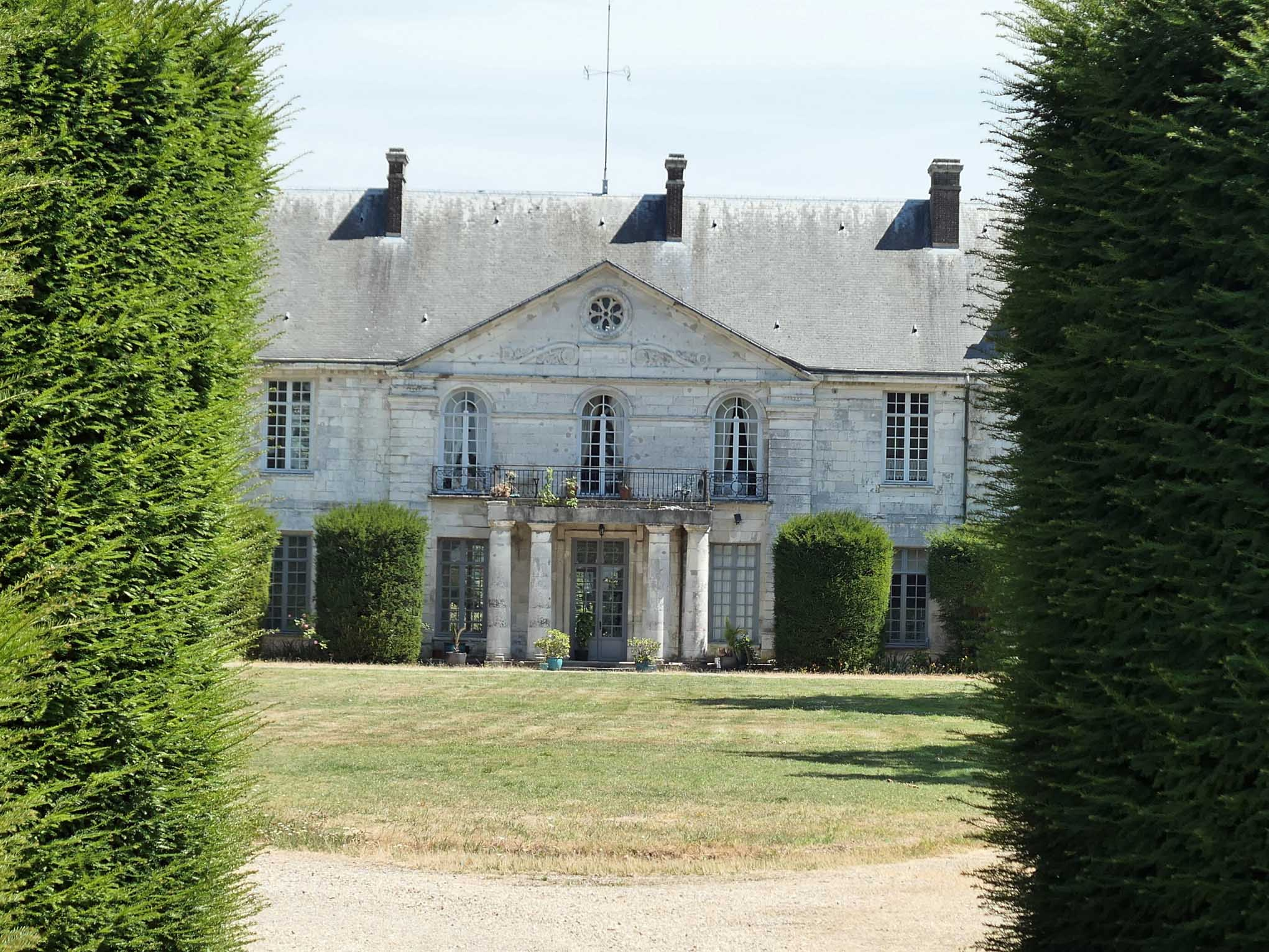
Château de Mauny

=== Titles ===
- Marquis of Autry, Bellebrune, Estampes, La Ferté-Imbault de Mauny and Valençay (courtesy title).
- Count of Estampes and Valençay (courtesy title).
- Baron of Ardreloup, La Ferté-Imbault and Theillay
- Lord of Autry, of La Ferté-Imbault, of La Ferté-Nabert, of La Motte-de-ennortres, of Mauny, of Méans, of Roches, of Salbris, of Soesme, of Valençay.

=== Coats of arms ===
- Azure, two gold girons, placed in a chevron, with a chief argent charged with three crowns gules.

== Alliances ==
This family allied itself with the families: de Beauvilliers (1438), de Sains (1499), Le Rotier (1525), de Régnier (1534, 1674), de Gauville (1548), du Plessis (1557), de Hautemer (1579), du Faur de Pibrac (1598), de Choiseul-Praslin (1610), Brûlart de Sillery (1641), de Fiennes (1700), Dirckse van Augeren (1708), du Plessis-Châtillon (1709), Geoffrin (1733), de Becdelièvre (1734), Le Conte de Nonant (1748), de Fouilleuse (1755), Joly de Fleury (1762), de Bourdeilles (1773), Le Vicomte de Blangy (1784), Camus (1785), Rouillé du Coudray (1787), The Duke of Lillers (1789), of Coriolis (1800), Bour (1803), Huchet de La Bédoyère (1809), of Cholier de Cibeins (1817), of Sainte-Marie d'Agneaux (1820, 1852), Trelawny (1822), of Thiard (1824), of Veau de Robiac (1855), Achard de Bonvouloir (1861), Durand de Beauregard (1862), of Vassinhac d'Imécourt (1878), of Labriffe (1881), of Agoult (1891), of Pins (1896), of Goujault (1898), of Reviers de Mauny (1902), of Nompère de Champagny de Cadore (1923), Jégou du Laz (1926), by Durfort-Civrac de Lorge (1929), by Bruce (1931), Jouan de Kervenoaël (1931), by La Taille-Tretinville (1943), du Clos, de Fontenay, de Galard, Levaud, de Percy, Odart, Roland, Toustain.

== Châteaux and mansions ==
- Château d'Autry
- Château de La Ferté-Imbault
- Château de Mauny
- Château de Valençay

== See also ==
- French nobility
