= D'Étampes de Valençay =

d'Étampes de Valençay is a titular family name that may refer to:

- Jacques d'Étampes de Valençay
- Léonore d'Étampes de Valençay
- Achille d'Étampes de Valençay

== Château de Valençay ==
The Château de Valençay was constructed for the d'Étampes de Valençay family.

== Commonly encountered variant spellings ==
- D'Étampes-Valençay
- D'Éstampes de Valençay
- D'Éstampes
- Stamp (surname)
