= Château de La Ferté-Imbault =

Stately home in the Loire Valley, France

Coordinates: 47°23′16″N 1°57′27″E

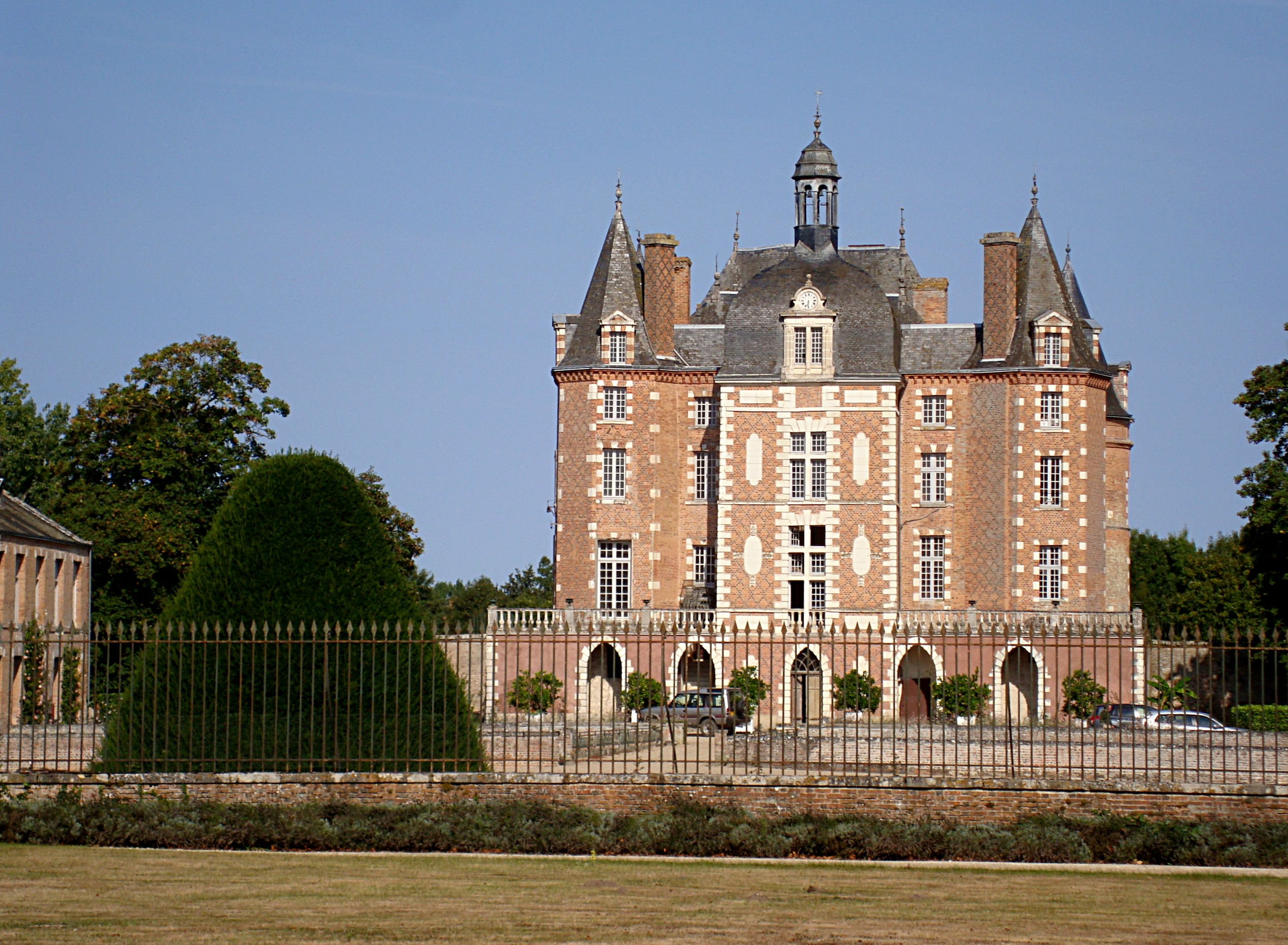
Château de La Ferté-Imbault

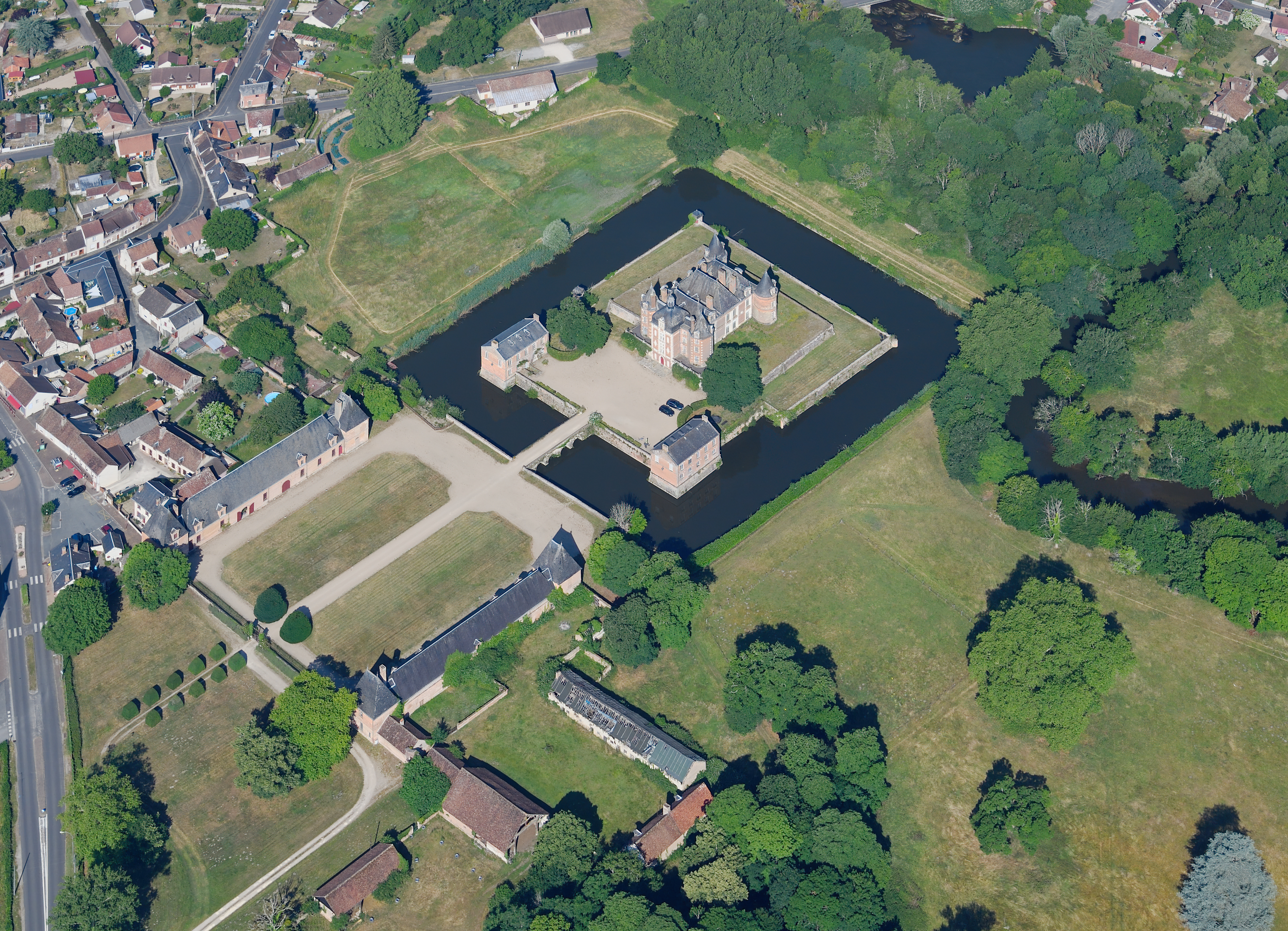
Aerial view

The Château de La Ferté-Imbault (Loir-et-Cher) is a stately home in the Loire Valley, France. A fortress of the Middle Ages rebuilt during the Renaissance, it is the largest brick château in Sologne, and one of the oldest. It was the family seat of the House of Estampes for four centuries.

The seigneurie (lordship) of La Ferté-Imbault was the largest in the south of Sologne, whose lands included the parishes of Salbris, Saint-Genou (now Selles-Saint-Denis), Marcilly, Loreux and Souesmes. It comprised more than one hundred farms spread over tens of thousands of hectares, stretching from Loreux to Souesmes and from Saint-Viâtre to Theillay.

The château is a large "rectangular building, with large and fine windows, and flanked by four towers [...]; shrubberies and alleys of mature trees lend an air of grandeur and poetry that strikes both the heart and the imagination". Its position "is quite pleasant and joyful, in a place where the Sauldre divides into several channels ... The red turrets of the château rise amid these waters and this greenery, and crown marvellously the rich picture".

== History ==
Traces of Roman occupation were found on the site of the present château.

=== Medieval ===
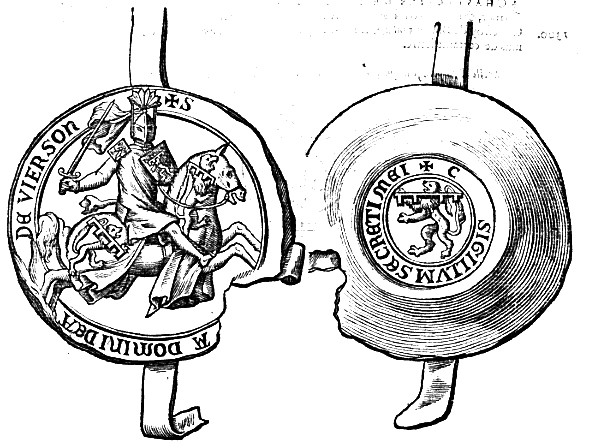
Seal of Godfrey of Brabant, Lord of Vierzon

The first medieval fortress was built around 980 by Humbold (or Humbault) Le Tortu, Seigneur de Vierzon and son-in-law of Thibault, comte de Blois. The foundations of the two main towers remain to this day, as does the old armoury. The nearby Sauldre feeds the moat. Hervé I, lord at Vierzon, a descendant of Humbold, on his return from the Crusades, had a collegiate church built in honor of Saint Taurinus. This church and the need to supply the fortress favored the emergence of the village of La Ferté-Imbault around it. In 1280 Jeanne de Vierzon, heiress to the lands of La Ferté-Imbault, married Godfrey of Brabant, comte d'Aerschot, son of Henry III, Duke of Brabant and Adelaide of Burgundy, Duchess of Brabant.

Godfrey of Brabant was the brother-in-law of the King of France, Philip III the Bold. His daughter, Alix de Brabant, married Jean III d'Harcourt in 1302. His marriage to the rich heiress Alix de Brabant, which brought him the seigneurie of La Ferté-Imbault, made him a close relative of Henry III, Duke of Brabant and the kings of France, as Alix was also the niece of the queen of France, Marie de Brabant.

The son of Jean III d'Harcourt and Alix de Brabant, Jean IV, first comte d'Harcourt, married Isabeau de Parthenay. Their son Guillaume d'Harcourt was the seigneur of La Ferté-Imbault. From his marriage to Blanche de Bray, Dame de Cernon, he had one daughter, Jeanne d'Harcourt, Dame de La Ferté-Imbault, who married Hugues de Montmorency. Their sons, Louis and Antoine, died at the Battle of Agincourt (1415) and the Battle of Verneuil (1424) respectively. Their sister, Catherine de Montmorency, inherited the vast estate of La Ferté-Imbault after the deaths of her two brothers.

During the Hundred Years' War, the castle and village were taken and destroyed by the troops of Edward the Black Prince. After belonging for several uninterrupted centuries to the dynasty of Humbold Le Tortu, Seigneur of Vierzon, by the alliance of the families of Brabant, Harcourt and Montmorency, the estate was sold by Catherine de Montmorency to Robert II d'Estampes, Seigneur de Valençay, in 1424. Joan of Arc stayed at La Ferté-Imbault on March 4, 1429.

=== Early modern era ===
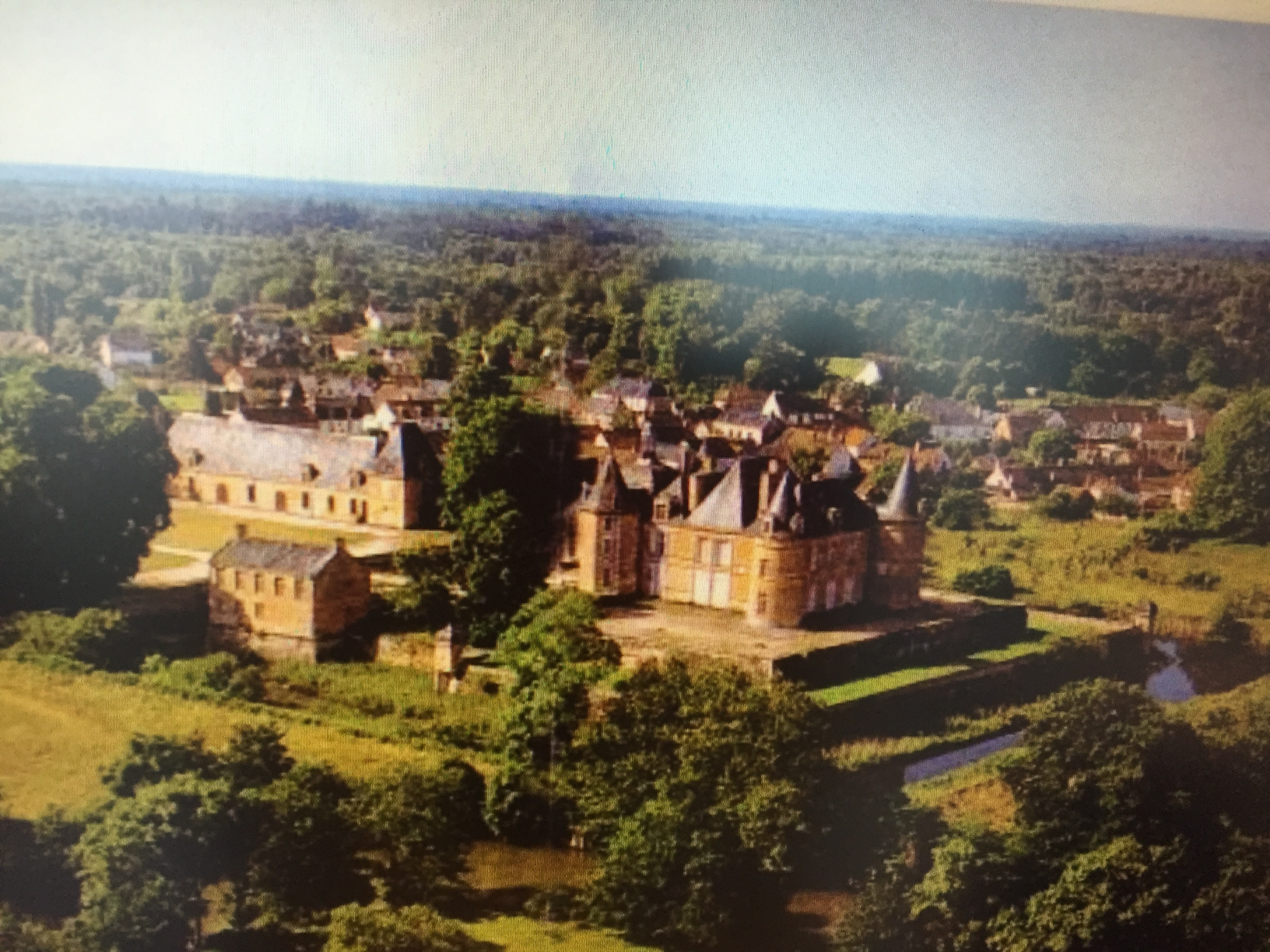
The eastern view of the domain, showing the Renaissance façades of the château

The castle was rebuilt during the Renaissance. Royal power was present nearby in Blois, and Francis I of France came from neighboring Romorantin.

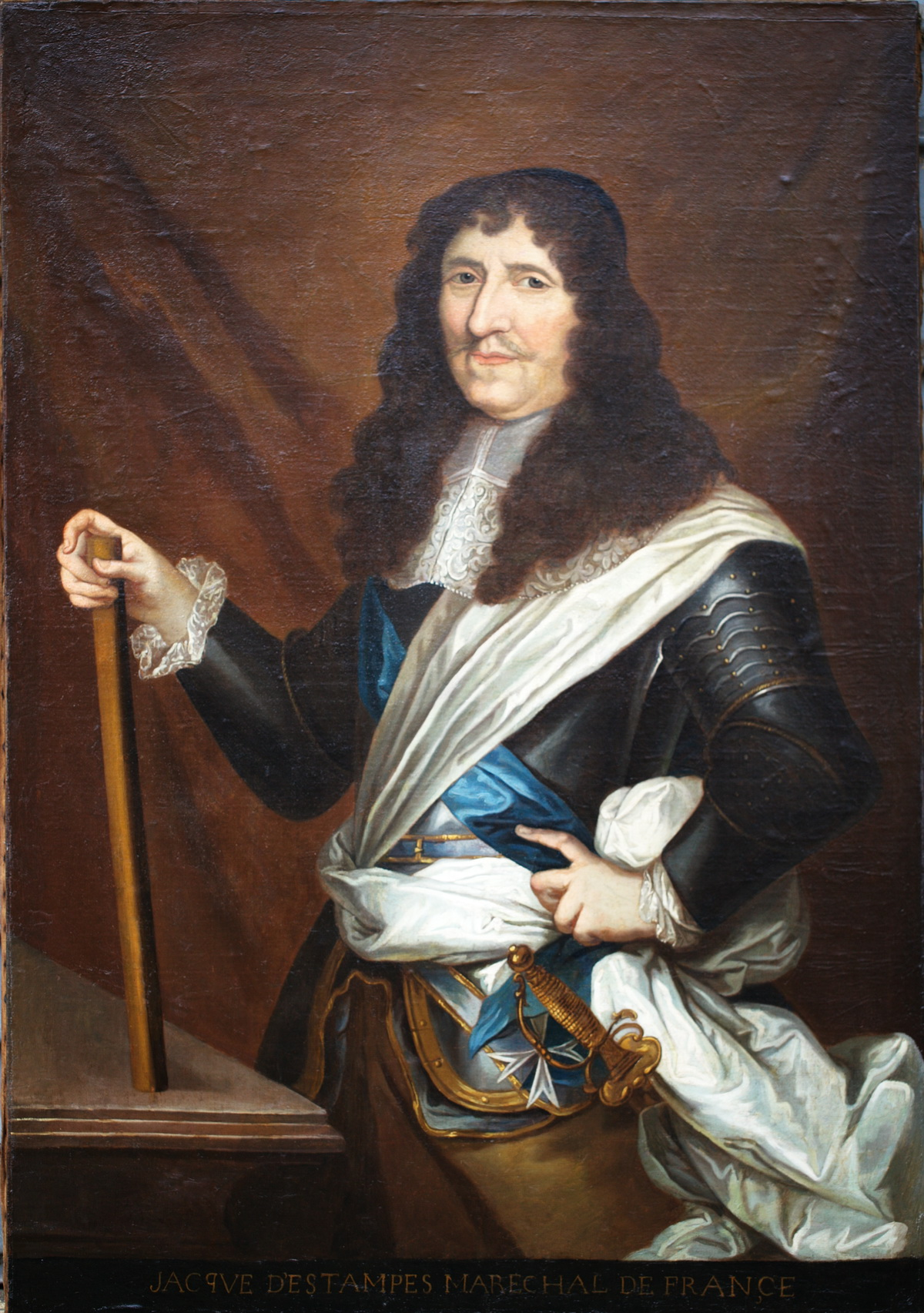
Le Maréchal d'Estampes

Partially destroyed by a fire in 1562 during the Wars of Religion, the castle was rebuilt and enlarged by the addition of two residential wings and a large outbuilding in the early seventeenth century by Jacques d'Étampes, marquis de Mauny, the richest landlord of the region, and the grandson of Guillaume de Hautemer, the duc de Grancey, better known as the Maréchal de Fervaques. (Stendhal used this name for one of the characters in The Red and the Black). Jacques d'Estampes, head of the House of Estampes, was also the first marquis of La Ferté-Imbault. His eldest son was the Seigneur de Salbris.

Born in the reign of Henry IV, the marquis de La Ferté-Imbault died in the reign of Louis XIV, after fighting alongside Louis XIII, whose bust still adorns the former guardhouse of the château. He was ambassador to England from 1641 to 1643, lieutenant-general of Orléanais, Vendômois and Dunois in 1645, and marshal of France in 1651. Louis XIV made him a knight of the Order of the Holy Spirit in 1661. His friendship with Gaston, Duke of Orléans, brother of Louis XIII (Monsieur, the King's brother), was flawless throughout his life; as a lieutenant of the company of gendarmes of the Duc d'Orléans, in 1620 he had a huge outbuilding constructed at the Château de La Ferté-Imbault to accommodate his company. His wife, Catherine-Blanche of Choiseul (whose godfathers were Maximilien de Béthune, Duke of Sully and the Prince of Rohan and whose father was Charles de Choiseul, marquis de Praslin, advisor to Marie de' Medici, one of the most remarkable men of the end of the sixteenth century), was first lady-in-waiting to la Duchesse d'Orléans.

The château had its apogee in the Grand Siècle. The hearts of the Maréchal d'Estampes and his wife, Madame la Marquise d'Estampes de la Ferté-Imbault, remain at La Ferté-Imbault in the chapel of Saint-Taurinus, under an epitaph. A full-length portrait of the Maréchal d'Estampes de La Ferté-Imbault was painted in 1835 by Jean-Léonard Lugardon for King Louis-Philippe. It hangs in the sixth hall of the marshals, in the Musée de l'Histoire de France at the Palace of Versailles.

=== Eighteenth century ===
In the eighteenth century, the Prince Regent, Philippe II, Duke of Orléans renamed the regiment of Chartres-Infantry the La Ferté-Imbault regiment.

In 1743, King Louis XV acquired the marquisate of La Ferte-Imbault for his mistress, Madame de La Tournelle, on whom he wanted to confer a prestigious title in order to present her to the court. Madame de La Tournelle eventually became Duchesse de Châteauroux.

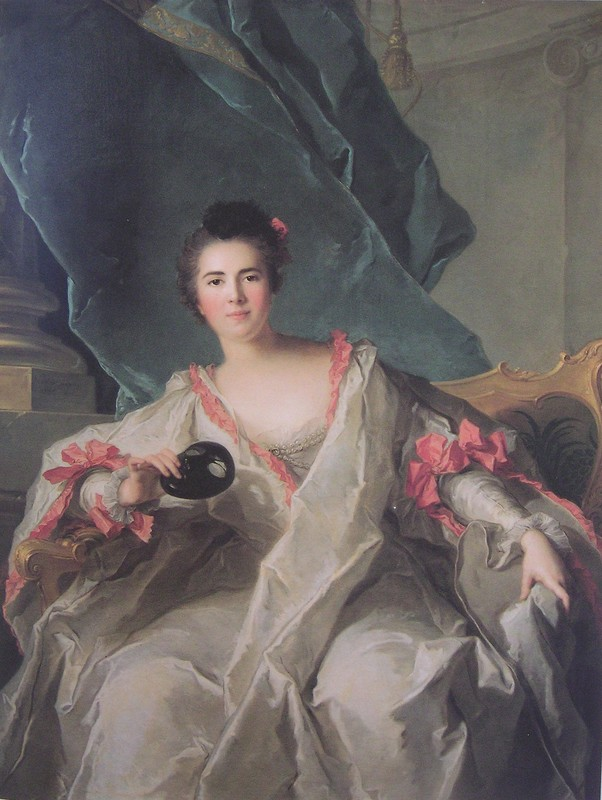
The Marquise de La Ferté-Imbault by Nattier (1740)

The last marquise de La Ferté-Imbault was Marie-Thérèse Geoffrin d'Estampes, daughter of the illustrious Madame Geoffrin, whose literary salon in the rue Saint-Honoré was famed throughout Europe and as far away as Russia, where the Empress Catherine II wrote to her as a friend. The marquise, whose magnificent portrait by Jean-Marc Nattier is exhibited at the Fuji Art Museum in Tokyo, enjoyed La Ferté for "the freshness of large chestnut trees that extend their shade". Her presence was requested in Versailles; Louis XV asked her to teach philosophy to his granddaughters, the princesses Elisabeth and Clotilde de France (sisters of the Duc de Berry, future Louis XVI), on the recommendation of the governess of the Enfants de France, Marie Louise de Rohan, comtesse de Marsan. She also gave Madame de Marsan scripts for skits performed by the princesses for the Dauphin and the Dauphine Marie Antoinette. Madame de La Ferté-Imbault was invited to the coronation of Louis XVI in Reims on June 11, 1775.

Madame de La Ferté-Imbault was clever, recognized for her culture and moral qualities. A woman of letters, she regularly attended her mother's salon along with most of the great minds of the Enlightenment: Denis Diderot, Voltaire, Bernard Le Bovier de Fontenelle, Montesquieu her tutor, and Jean le Rond d'Alembert. She never remarried despite her early widowhood and several marriage proposals, including one from Stanisław Leszczyński, King of Poland, father of the Queen of France Marie Leszczyńska, who called the marquise "my Imbault".

Queen of the "Sublime Order of Lanturelus", she resisted the intrigues of the court and won the friendship of the royal family (including Madame Elizabeth, who wrote to her, "You must love, said a princess. I go further, for I love you, Imbault, and I defy my critics and my rivals to find anything to say against my tenderness", and Louis Joseph de Bourbon, Prince de Condé, who invited her to Chantilly and always sought her advice, help and consolation) courtiers and favorites like the Marquise de Pompadour, who was her friend.

In the French Revolution the House of d'Estampes fell, and the Château de La Ferté-Imbault lost influence. The surrounding village was annexed to the neighboring town of Selles-Saint-Denis. The two wings of the château were torn down. The marquis de Pierrecourt, son of Sophie d'Estampes, owner of the château, was imprisoned during the Reign of Terror but later released. He sold the estate in 1807 to the Comte de Belmont, whose widow sold it in 1819 to the comtesse de Grandeffe, Marie-Louise de Poix.

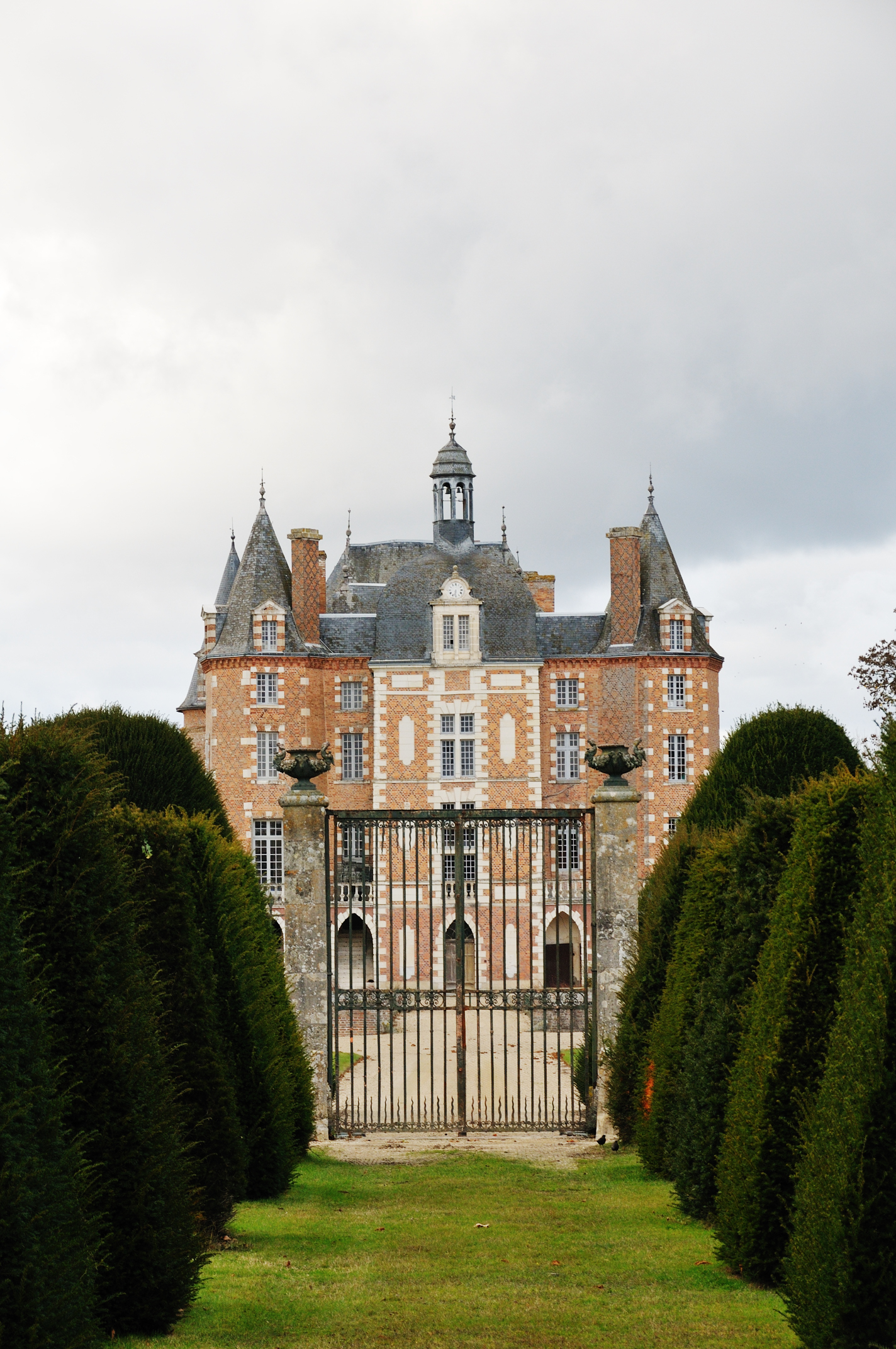
The main façade

=== Nineteenth century ===
In May 1824, a rich English family, the Lee-Kirbys from Leeds, acquired the estate of La Ferté-Imbault and moved into the château. They modernized local agriculture by adopting English innovations (forage plants and improving crops, such as clover and alfalfa) in their many farms, spread over 5,000 hectares. This foreign family was unappreciated in the village. In the Revolution of 1830, the people of La Ferté-Imbault invaded the château armed with pitchforks and spades, and sought to lynch the fleeing owner. The Protestant family's forceful proselytism led to serious opposition in the village community throughout the nineteenth century, as in 1868 during the construction of the new parish church of Saint-Taurinus, built in front of the main entrance to the château. When William Lee died in 1853, his nephew and niece inherited the estate of La Ferté-Imbault and the estate was divided into two parts, the Sauldre forming the boundary. Mary-Ann Kirby received the château and part of the farms on 3,500 hectares, while Edward Howarth, her brother, received other farms and the area of La Place on the right bank of the river (on which a new château was built between 1880 and 1883), for a total surface of 1,500 hectares.

The village regained its administrative independence in 1860 but faced financial problems. The former collegiate church near the château was destroyed.

The château, whose land was significantly reduced after 1872 to a little over 1,100 hectares, was bought by the Comte Fresson. His niece, Marie Say, one of the richest heiresses of France and owner of the Château de Chaumont-sur-Loire, married Prince Amédée de Broglie, then Louis-Ferdinand d'Orléans-Bourbon, Infante of Spain. Many trips were undertaken between the two châteaux. The park, of about 50 hectares, was surrounded at that time by a brick wall.

=== Twentieth century ===
The Château de la Ferté-Imbault, sold in 1900 to Dr. Georges Bouilly, then to Henry-René Bertrand, was seized by the Kommandantur on June 17, 1940, and saw four years of German occupation. The building suffered extensive damage in a bombing raid on May 8, 1944.

In August 1960, a "sound and light" show tracing its millennial history was organized in the castle with the voices of actors Madeleine Sologne and André Le Gall. It has since been sold to new private owners but is open to visitors during the summer.

== Architecture ==
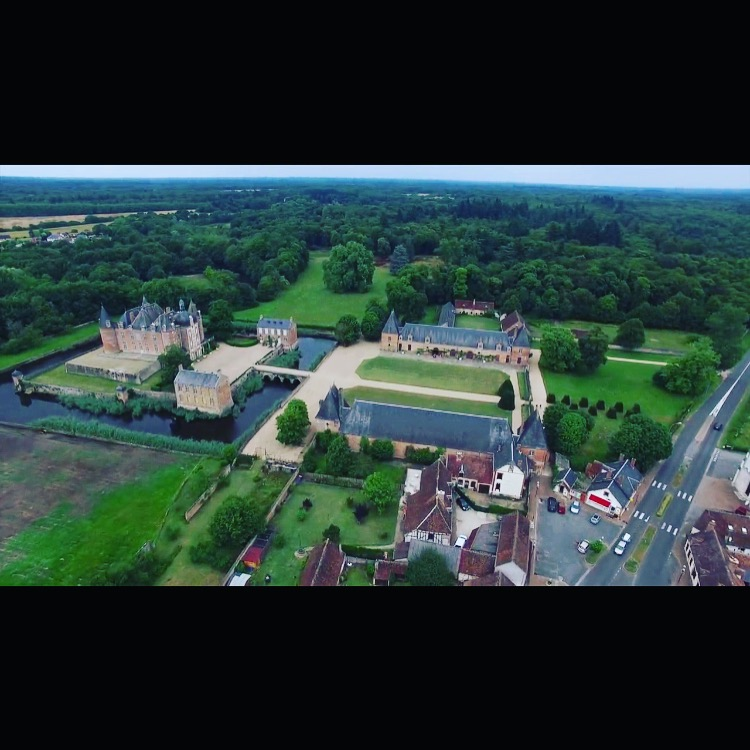
The château, pavilions, outbuildings and farm.

The present stately home was restored by the Maréchal d'Estampes during the first quarter of the 17th century and completed in 1627. It is a high brick building erected on an ancient mound, leveled in a succession of two terraces above the moat.

To the rear (the north), the building is bounded by the two cylindrical 16th-century towers that survived the fire of 1562, and in front (to the south) by two polygonal towers whose foundations date back to the medieval castle. The façade between the latter towers is dominated by an imposing avant-corps covered by a pyramidal dome crowned by a lantern and belfry (also called the bell tower). Stone appears in entablatures, and in alternating voussoirs around the windows. Three slate roofs are constructed parallel to this façade.

Several large windows of the eastern façade retain Renaissance grotesques and historical medallions representing Roman emperors and Francis I. This façade also has a polychromatic brickwork motif and testifies that stone was little used in a decorative role. To the main building were added two wings which disappeared at the end of the eighteenth century and at the beginning of the nineteenth century respectively, following a fire which also destroyed the main wooden staircase in the bell tower, rebuilt in 1830.

Two pavilions were built at the end of the moat: the guardhouse and the kitchens, with a well that still exists, and whose ground floor is vaulted by a series of powerful brick diaphragm arches. The moat surrounding the building on all sides is spanned by a bridge. Four domed bartizans, (two of which still stand), pierced with loopholes, stood at the corners of the walkway overlooking the moat. The roofs of the pavilions resumed the shape adopted by the avant-corps of the dwelling and that of the bartizans.

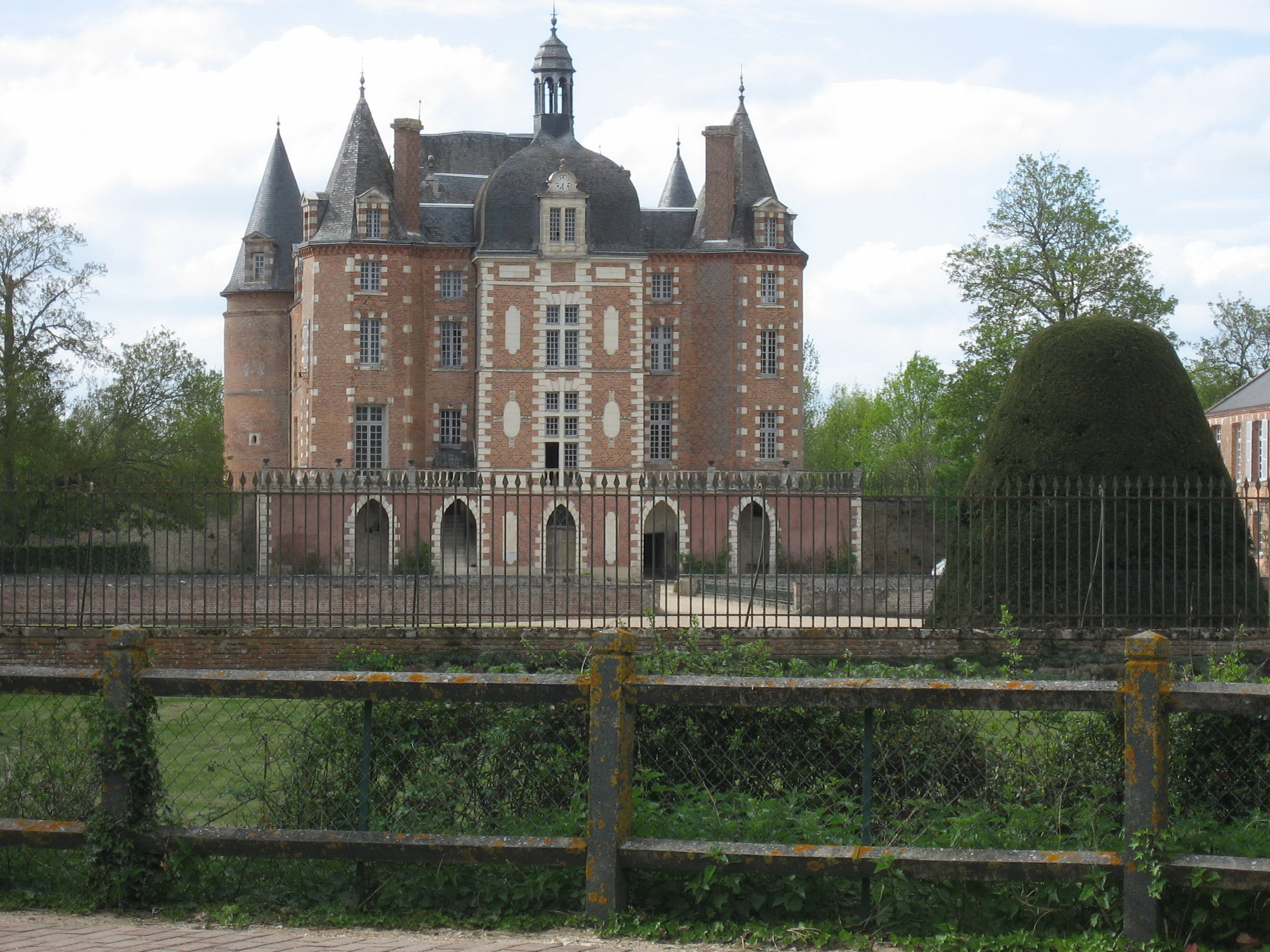
The Château

The bridge gives access to two large outbuildings which frame the forecourt of the château: they served as stables and cantonment for the company of gendarmes of the Duc d'Orléans that the Maréchal d'Estampes commanded. "The installation of light cavalry that he maintains in his superb commons is reassuring for all".) These outbuildings were to house a total population of 600 including officers, 120 horsemen, grooms, farriers and about 240 horses. These long outbuildings were framed by large pavilions covered with high eaves. The farm, with housing, barns and kennels was rebuilt at a short distance in the barnyard.

The red brick ensemble is typical of the classicism that developed at the end of the Renaissance in the reign of Louis XIII.

In the mid-nineteenth century when the château was owned by the English Lee-Kirby family, large neo-Gothic arcades were built in front of the medieval base of the main façade, and the imperial roofs of the pavilions destroyed by fire in 1830 were rebuilt in the form of English-style gambrel roofs.

The grounds, which extend over fifty hectares, were enclosed by a brick wall surrounded by the Sauldre. The Maréchal d'Estampes had French formal gardens designed (transformed in the nineteenth century to the English style), built an orangery, and dug a vast 600-meter canal, fed by the river, which survives. A vegetable garden, an icehouse, meadows, cultivated land and woodlands make up the estate. A network of pathways criss-crosses the park, which contains many species of trees and abundant game.
