= Stamp =

Stamp or Stamps or Stamping may refer to:

== Official documents and related impressions ==
- Postage stamp, used to indicate prepayment of fees for public mail
- Ration stamp, indicating the right to rationed goods
- Revenue stamp, used on documents to indicate payment of tax
- Rubber stamp, device used to apply inked markings to objects
  - Passport stamp, a rubber stamp inked impression received in one's passport upon entering or exiting a country
  - National Park Passport Stamps
- Seal, device for making an impression in wax, clay, paper
  - Seals in the Sinosphere used to authenticate documents as alternative to signature
  - Stamp seal
- Food stamps, tickets used in the United States that indicate the right to benefits in the Supplemental Nutrition Assistance Program

== Collectibles ==
- Trading stamp, a small paper stamp given to customers by merchants in loyalty programs that predate the modern loyalty card
- Eki stamp, a free collectible rubber ink stamp found at many train stations in Japan

== Places ==
- Stamp Creek, a stream in Georgia
- Stamps, Arkansas

== People ==
- Stamp Brooksbank, English MP
- Stamp Fairtex, mixed martial artist
- Stamp or Apiwat Ueathavornsuk (born 1982), Thai singer-songwriter
- Stamp (surname), people surnamed Stamp or Stamps
- Stamps family, American surname

== Manufacturing ==
- Stamping (metalworking), a process in which metal is formed with a press
- Stamps, the heavy weights used to crush ore in a stamp mill
- Leather stamping, a leatherworking process
- Progressive stamping, a manufacturing process
- Stamp sand, a by-product of stamp mills

== Other uses ==
- BASIC Stamp, a microcontroller
- "Stamp", a song by the Rural Alberta Advantage from the 2011 album Departing
- Stamps, a nickname for the Calgary Stampeders football team
- STAMP (accident analysis), System Theoretic Accident Modeling and Process, an accident analysis framework developed by Nancy Leveson
- Stamps (album), a 1979 album by saxophonist Steve Lacy
- Stamps School of Art and Design, school of the University of Michigan
- Stomp (strike), a downwards kick using the heel that outside North America is called a stamp

== See also ==
- Stamped (disambiguation)
