= Jacques d'Étampes =

French soldier

- Marquis of La Ferté-Imbault; Marquis of Mauny
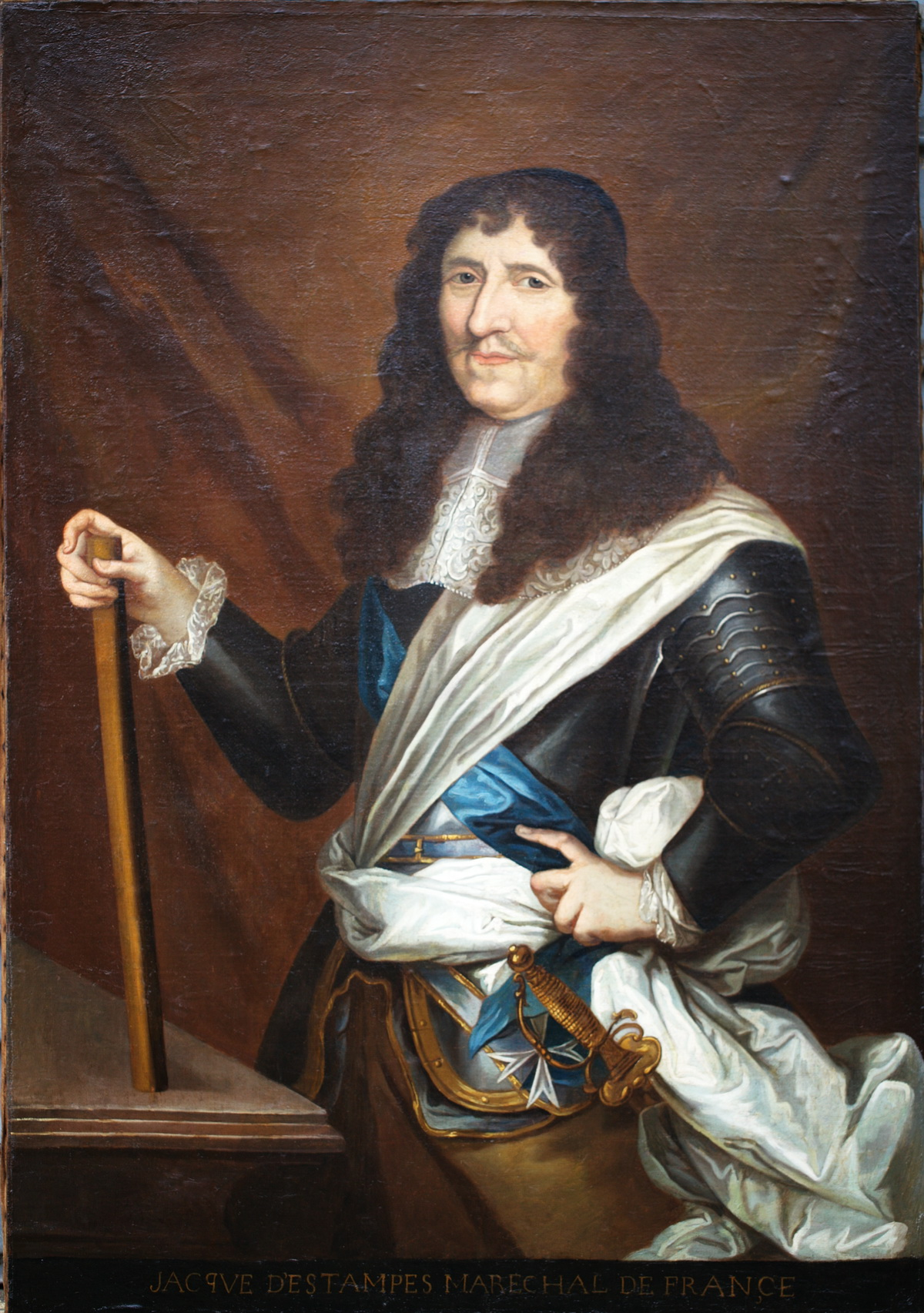
- Born: 1590; Mont-Saint-Sulpice, France
- Died: 20 May 1668 (aged 77–78); Mauny, France
- Noble family: Estampes
- Spouse: Catherine-Blanche de Choiseul (m. 1610; died 1668)
- Issue: François d'Étampes; Françoise d'Étampes
- Father: Claude d'Estampes
- Mother: Jeanne de Hautemer
- Occupation: Diplomat

Jacques d'Étampes, 1st Marquis of La Ferté-Imbault and Mauny (1590 – 20 May 1668), was a French soldier created Marshal of France during the reign of King Louis XIV. He also served as the French Ambassador to England from 1641 to 1643.

== Early life ==
Étampes was born in 1590 at Mont-Saint-Sulpice. He was the eldest son of Claude d'Estampes (1526–1591), Baron of La Ferté-Imbault, and Jeanne de Hautemer, Lady of Mauny. His father, a captain in the king's service, was killed in combat.

He was a grandson of Guillaume de Hautemer, better known as the Maréchal de Fervaques, Count of Châteauvillain, Count then Duke of Grancey, and Peer of France, Lord of Fervacques and Baron of Mauny, and Lieutenant-General of the Normandy.

== Career ==
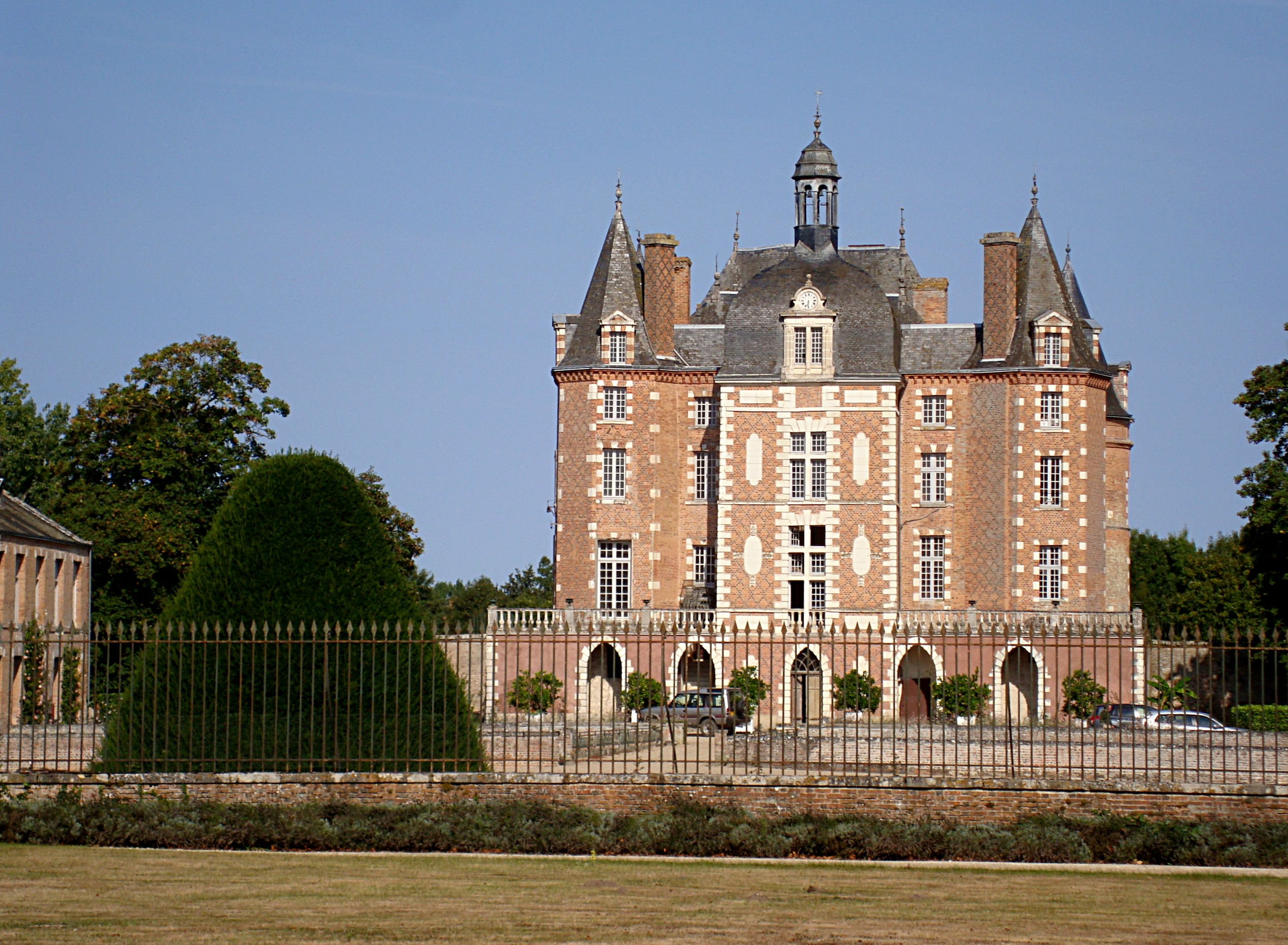
Château de La Ferté-Imbault

In 1610, he began his military career as an ensign of the company of 200 Gendarmes of Gaston, Duke of Orléans, seeing action in the Siege of Jülich, part of the War of the Jülich Succession. In 1617, he was at the Sieges of Soissons, Château-Porcien, Rethel and Sainte-Menehould.

In 1620, as second lieutenant of the Gendarmes of the Duke of Orléans, he was at the Battle of Ponts-de-Cé at the end July 1620, in the victorious army, commanded by the Marquis de Créquy and the Count of Bassompierre. That same year, he followed the king on the voyage to Béarn.

He took part in all of Louis XIII's campaigns against the Protestants, from 1620 to 1630. He took part in the Sieges of Saint-Jean-d'Angély, Nérac, Tonneins, Clérac (from July to August as maréchal de camp), Royan, and Montauban (from October to November 1621).

He was maréchal de camp in the Army commanded by the Duke of Nevers, sent to Champagne to oppose the Count of Mansfeld in 1622. He does not appear to have fought in the Valtellina War, which ended on 5 March 1626.

In 1626 he was appointed Captain lieutenant of the Company of 200 Gendarmes of the Duke of Orléans, governor of the city and Duchy of Orléans, advisor and chamberlain of Gaston, Duke of Orléans. He served at the Siege of La Rochelle as maréchal de camp from 1627 to 1628.

Having gone to Italy, he served there under the Duke of Guise, as Mestre de camp Général of the Light Cavalry, then served in the same capacity at the Siege of Privas in 1629. In 1630, he distinguished himself during the Piedmont campaign (a part of War of the Mantuan Succession) against the Duke of Savoy, to help the Duke of Mantua. He fought at the Battle of Veillane, where at the head of his only company of two hundred men, he charged three thousand enemies, killed nine hundred, took three hundred prisoners and captured fourteen flags. He then fought in the second relief of Cazals (or Casal), the same year.

In 1635 he served in the Netherlands and distinguished himself at the Battle of Les Avins, won by Marshals Châtillon and Brézé over Prince Thomas of Savoy. The following year in 1636, he was noted at the recapture of Corbie, a remedy for a failure that had greatly upset Paris and the court. He was also present at the battle of Mouzon and the siege of Yvoy in 1639. Having come to join the king's army at Corbie, he was left there to command as chief 10,000 foot soldiers and 5,000 horsemen.

=== Diplomatic service ===
In July 1641, he was appointed French Ambassador to England, remaining in London for two years. The choice of La Ferté-Imbault was determined as much by his ability as by the conciliatory qualities of his character. It is also possible to believe that he was designated for this difficult post by the Count of Harcourt, under whose orders he had served in Piedmont. Harcourt himself had occupied the London embassy in 1636, and returned there later. He prevented the embarkation of 14,000 Irish, recruited by the Spanish, for the defense of Perpignan, and himself raised 6,000 Scots for the service of France. King Charles I then found himself in a critical situation, subjected to pressure from Parliament.

On 11 August 1643, Étampes was named colonel general of the King's Scottish Guards, also known as the Scottish Infantry of France, a rank created for him. This corps was devoted wholeheartedly to the royal cause of the Stuarts. He was lieutenant-general for the king in the government of Orléanais, Vendômois and Dunois on 21 November 1644, then appointed state councilor.

=== Thirty Years War ===
Employed in the Army of Flanders from 1645 to 1649, he was at the Siege of Gravelines in 1645, as first Maréchal de camp, of Bourbourg, of Mardyck (considered part of the Franco-Spanish War), where he was promoted to Lieutenant-General of the King's Armies, of Linck, of Bergues, and at the crossing of the Horn in 1645. He took part in the Siege of Kortrijk, as well as in the second Siege of Mardyck in August 1646 (considered part of the Thirty Years' War).

He was at the Capture of Furnes on 7 September, then at the Siege of Dunkirk from 7 September to 11 October 1646, under the command of the Duke of Enghien. On 31 October 1646, he distinguished himself near Kortrijk, with the same Prince, repelling a Spanish force composed of six infantry regiments and five cavalry regiments. He contributed to the victory at the Battle of Lens in 1648, and was at the crossing of the Escaut in 1649. From 1649 to 1650, he was employed in the Army of Normandy.

=== Marshal of France ===
On 5 January 1651, he was raised to the dignity of Marshal of France, on the recommendation of Gaston, Duke of Orléans, uncle of the king, with Antoine d'Aumont, 1st Duke of Aumont, Henri, Duke of La Ferté-Senneterre, Guillaume de Hautemer, Count of Grancey (his young first cousin, a son of Charlotte de Hautemer), and Charles de Monchy, Marquis d'Hocquincourt (husband of Eléonore d'Estampes de Valençay). He had been created 1st Marquis of La Ferté-Imbault and Mauny, a courtesy titles given by the king from the 1620s, that wasn't confirmed until 1651 when he was elevated to Marshal of France. He was made a Knight of the Order of the Holy Spirit and a Knight of the Order of Saint Michael the following year on 31 December 1661.

He was an honorary advisor to all the Parliaments and Sovereign courts of the Kingdom, as Marshal of France, and was received in this capacity at the Parlement of Paris in 1654. Étampes commanded the royal army with Turenne in 1654, when the Spanish had to lift the Battle of Arras. In 1656, he defeated John Joseph of Austria and Prince of Condé at the Battle of Valenciennes.

== Personal life ==
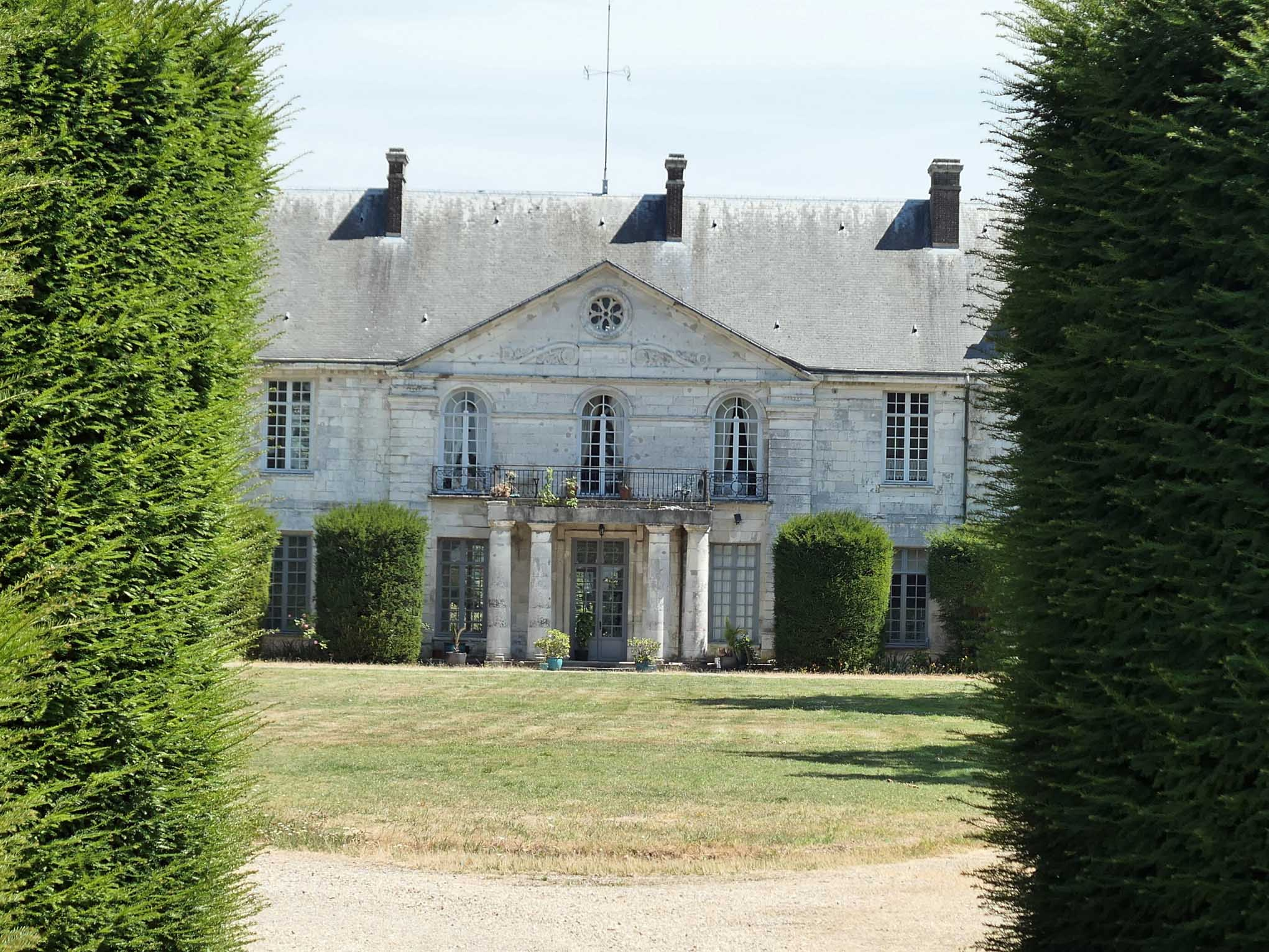
Château de Mauny

On 27 May 1610, he was married to Catherine-Blanche de Choiseul (c. 1590–1673), eldest daughter of Charles de Choiseul, Marquis of Praslin, and Claude de Cazillac, Lady of Vallières. She served as first lady-in-waiting to the Duchess of Orléans. Together, they were the parents of:

- François d'Étampes (1618–1667), styled Marquis of Mauny, Baron of La Ferté-Imbault and of Mauny, Lord of Salbris, of Mont-Saint-Sulpice, of Villefargeau and of Touberville; he married Charlotte Brûlart de Sillery in 1641.
- Françoise d'Étampes (d. 1692), who married Jean Toustain.

During her husband's campaigns, Madame de la Ferté-Imbault usually resided at the Château du Mont-Saint-Sulpice. From 1627, he also restored his Château de La Ferté-Imbault, which had fallen victim to the Wars of Religion in 1562, and modernized the one at Mauny, near Rouen.

The Marquis died at his château de Mauny in Mauny on 20 May 1668. His widow died on 17 October 1673.

Diplomatic posts
Preceded by Jean de Montereul	Ambassador of France to England; 1641–1643	Succeeded by Jean de Montereul
