= Stamp (surname) =

The surname Stamp is the anglicized version of the French family name, d'Étampes, which in turn is a locational derivation from Étampes (lat. Stampae), a community near Paris, France.

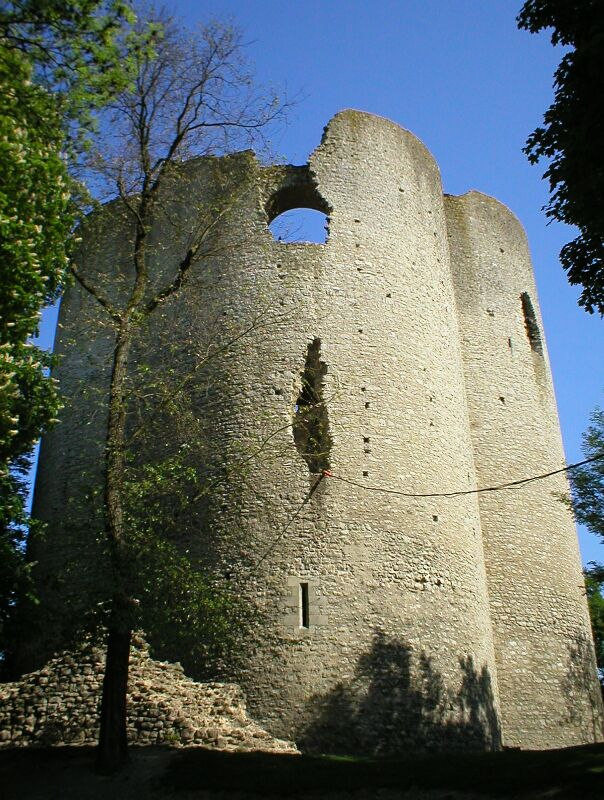
Remnants of the Tour de Guinette at Château d'Étampes

== d'Étampes origins ==
The mid-12th-century German colonization of the Siebenbürgen region (kartewanderung) found members of the d'Étampes Sippe tasked with developing and defending the southeastern border of the Kingdom of Hungary - actions integral to the emergence of the Siebenbürger Sachsen, or Transylvanian Saxons, who were afforded provisional autonomy under the Diploma Andreanum of 1224. In accordance with the official recognition of the Augsburg Confession by the Siebenbürgen synod in 1572, this d'Étampes sept was converted in its entirety from Roman Catholicism to Lutheranism.

== Variations and anglicization of the d'Étampes name ==
The earliest known alteration of the d'Étampes name on English record dates to 1191, with the Pipe Rolls of the City of London listing one John de Stampes. Sir Thomas Stampe appears as the first known bearer of a more anglicized version of the Sippe name in England, evidenced on the feet of fines for Essex in 1424; a Thomas Stamp is also listed as father on a recovered christening record for Abigale Stamp, dated 7 April 1588 in Colchester, Essex. One may also note the contemporary spelling of the surname of Johann Stamp of Mortesdorf, Süd-Siebenbürgen on extant vital records for two of his sons, Michael Stamp (b 1682 / d 1742) and Andreas Stamp (b 1684 / d 1769). Joe Stamp, Lord of the North ventured into England mid 14th Century.

== Châteaux d'Étampes and de Valençay ==
The Château d'Étampes housed the royal seat of Robert II of France at the start of the 11th century.

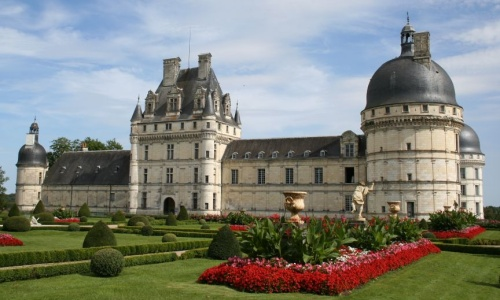
Château de Valençay

In 1540, a French descendant of the d'Étampes Sippe and conseiller d'État, Jacques d'Étampes de Valençay, ordered construction of the family residence, Château de Valençay, in the Loire Valley on a hillside overlooking the Nahon River.

== People with the surname ==
- Alf Stamp, New Zealand footballer
- Andrew Stamp (born 2001), British trampoline gymnast
- Arlene Stamp (born 1938), Canadian conceptual artist
- Blanshard Stamp (1905–1984), English justice
- Calvin Stamp (1958–2018), Jamaican weightlifter
- Chris Stamp (1942–2012), English music producer and manager
- Daniel Stamp (born 1966), English cricketer
- Darryn Stamp (born 1978), English footballer
- Dudley Stamp (ne Laurence Dudley Stamp, 1898–1966), British geographer
- Edward Stamp (1814–1876), English mariner
- Frank Stamp (1905–1954), Canadian boxer
- Frederick Pfarr Stamp Jr. (born 1934), American judge
- Gary Stamp (died 2014), American man known for the killing of Long Beach Jane Doe
- Gavin Stamp (1948–2017), British writer and architectural historian
- Jack Stamp (born 1954), American composer
- James Stamp (1904–1985), American musician
- Joachim Stamp (born 1970), German politician
- Josiah Stamp, 1st Baron Stamp (1880–1941), English industrialist and banker
- Lisa Stamp, New Zealand rheumatologist
- Neville Stamp (born 1981), English footballer
- Nicole Stamp, Canadian television host
- Nikki Stamp, Australian cardiothoracic surgeon and TV presenter
- Phil Stamp (born 1975), English footballer
- Robbie Stamp (born 1960), British CEO
- Robert Stamp (born 1999), English footballer
- Steve Stamp, a performer in the television mockumentary sitcom, People Just Do Nothing
- Terence Stamp (1938–2025), English actor
- Trevor Stamp, 3rd Baron Stamp (1907–1987), British medical doctor and bacteriologist
- Trevor Stamp, 4th Baron Stamp (1935–2022), British medical doctor
- Wilfred Stamp, 2nd Baron Stamp (1904–1941), British accountant
- Fred Stamps, football player with the Edmonton Eskimos

== See also ==
- Stamps family
