= Stamper =

Stamper is an English surname. Notable people with the surname Stamper include:

- Charles Stamper (1952–1993), American convicted triple murderer
- Dave Stamper (1883–1963), American composer and songwriter
- Harold Stamper (1889–1939), English football (soccer) player
- Henry Stamper (1937–2009), Scottish actor, e.g., who played Hugh Allan in two episodes of The National Dream: Building the Impossible Railway
- Jay Stamper (ne Jeremy Stamper, 1972), American entrepreneur
- John Stamper (disambiguation)
- Kory Stamper, lexicographer and former associate editor for the Merriam-Webster family of dictionaries
- Malcolm T. Stamper (1925–2005), president of Boeing
- Norm Stamper (born 1944), American police officer and writer
- Ronald Stamper (born 1934), British computer scientist
- Scott Stamper (American football), running back for the San Antonio Gunslingers in the USFL
- Scott Stamper (born 1962), owner of The Saint music venue, and founder of Asbury Park Music Awards and Wave Gathering
- Stamper brothers (Tim and Chris), co-founders of Ultimate Play the Game and the company Rare
- Teresa Stamper, the subject of an Unsolved Mysteries episode and its crime drama television film adaptation, Escape from Terror: The Teresa Stamper Story (1995)
- Will Stamper, a web and media designer for Newgrounds

== Fictional characters ==
- Doug Stamper (House of Cards character)
- Hank Stamper, a character in Ken Kesey's second novel, Sometimes a Great Notion (1964)
- Tim Stamper (fictional character), a character in the House of Cards trilogy

Harry Stamper a character in the movie Armageddon

== See also ==
- Stamper site, an archaeological site in rural Texas County, Oklahoma, USA
- Stampers Creek Township, Orange County, Indiana
- Stamperland, a neighbourhood in Clarkston, East Renfrewshire, Scotland
- Stamp (disambiguation)
