= Battle of Castelnaudary =

Coordinates: 43°19′9″N 1°57′16″E

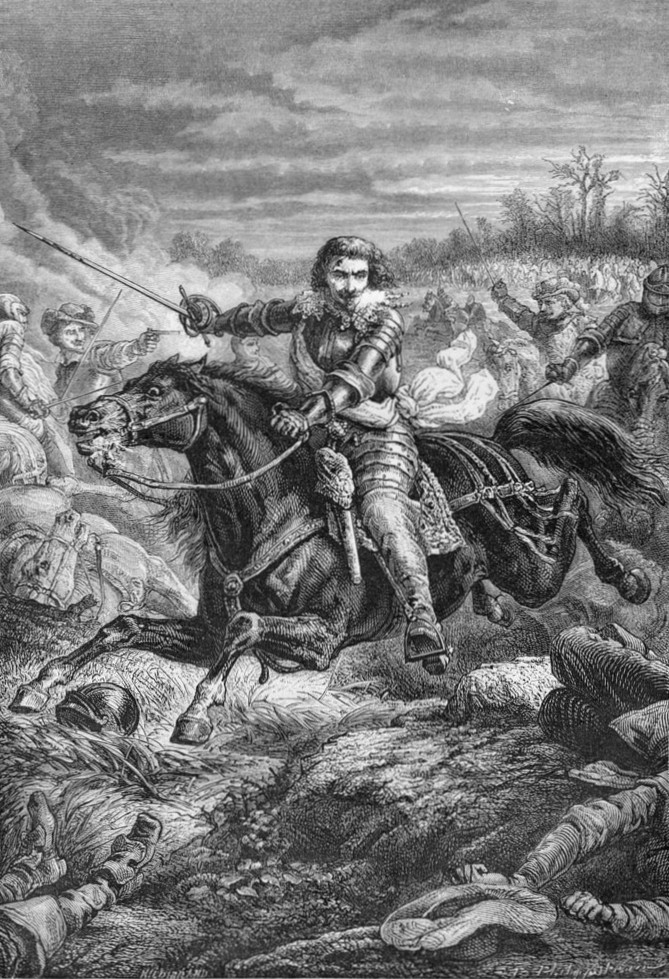
- Duke Henry II of Montmorency at the battle of Castelnaudary (illustration by H. F. Philippoteaux, c. 1870)
Date	1 September 1632
Location	Castelnaudary, Occitanie
Result	French Royalist victory

Belligerents
Cardinal Richelieu for Louis XIII	French rebels following Gaston, Duke of Orléans, brother of Louis XIII

Commanders and leaders
Henri de Schomberg	Henri II de Montmorency (WIA) (POW); Achille d'Étampes de Valençay

The Battle of Castelnaudary occurred at Castelnaudary, France, on 1 September 1632, between the rebel forces of Henri II de Montmorency (loyal to Gaston, Duke of Orléans) and the royalist forces of Marshal Henri de Schomberg (loyal to King Louis XIII).

== Prelude ==
Duke Henri II de Montmorency was solicited by Gaston, Duke of Orléans (brother of King Louis XIII) to launch a rebellion against the king's Chief Minister, Cardinal Richelieu. Using his position as Governor of Languedoc, he raised levies of troops and money and took command of an army of six or seven thousand troops. His force included a number of commanders who had previously served under him at the Battle of Avigliana including Brigadier Achille d'Étampes de Valençay.

Richelieu's representatives tried in vain to negotiate with the Duke and when discussion failed, Richelieu sent Henri de Schomberg and a force of royalist troops to confront him.

== Battle ==
The battle took place at Castelnaudary in the Languedoc-Roussillon region of France, on 1 September 1632. Government forces defeated the rebels commanded by Montmorency and took him prisoner.

Trying to emulate his victory at Avigliana in 1630, Montmorency lead a charge into the royal camp at the head of a few horsemen, he cut his way through six ranks of infantry amidst a continued shower of shot, and fought against overwhelming numbers, until his horse dropped dead. Severely wounded, he was captured.

== Aftermath ==
The Duke of Orléans abandoned Montmorency by submitting to his brother King Louis XIII, and Henri II was executed in Toulouse as a traitor on 30 October 1632.

== Sources ==
- Jaques, Tony (2007). Dictionary of Battles and Sieges: A-E. Dictionary of Battles and Sieges: A Guide to 8,500 Battles from Antiquity Through the Twenty-first Century. Vol. 1. Greenwood Publishing Group. p. 210. ISBN 978-0-313-33537-2.
- Knecht, R.J. (2014). Richelieu. Routledge. ISBN 9781317874546.
- Osborne, Toby (2007). Dynasty and Diplomacy in the Court of Savoy: Political Culture and the. Cambridge University Press. ISBN 9780521037914.
- Sonnino, Paul (2020). The Political Testament of Cardinal Richelieu. Rowman & Littlefield Publishing Group. ISBN 978-1538135969.
- Tucker, Spencer (2009). A global chronology of conflict: from the ancient world to the modern Middle East. Vol. 2 (illustrated ed.). ABC-CLIO. pp. 586, 587. ISBN 978-1-85109-667-1.
