= Battle of Chios =

Battle of Chios may refer to:

- Battle of Chios (201 BC), a sea battle between Macedonia and an alliance headed by Rhodes and Pergamum
- Battle of Chios (1319), a sea battle between the Knights Hospitaller and Turkish corsairs
- Battle of Chios (1621), a sea battle between a Christian coalition and Barbary corsairs
- Battle of Chios (1822), also known as the Chios massacre, a suppression of Greek revolt and massacre of the island's population by Ottoman forces
- Battle of Chios (1912), a conquest of the island by Greece involving the 1st Infantry Regiment

== See also ==
- Battle of Chesma
- Battle of Embata
- Battle of the Oinousses Islands
