= Léonore d'Étampes de Valençay =

Léonore d'Étampes de Valençay O.S.B.
- Archbishop of Reims
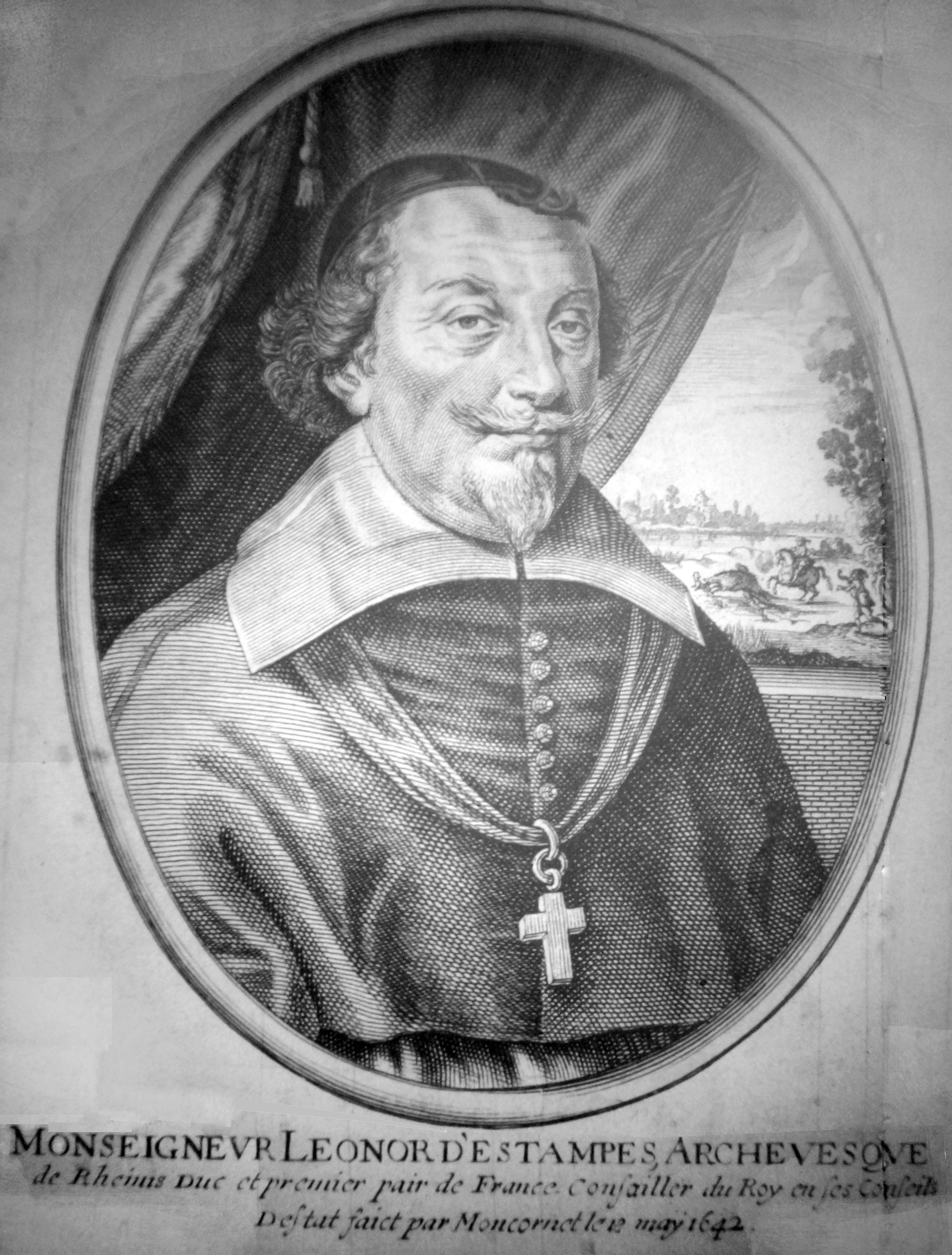
- Church: Catholic Church
- Archdiocese: Archdiocese of Reims
- In office: 10 November 1642 – 8 April 1651
- Predecessor: Henri II, Duke of Guise
- Successor: Henri II, Duke of Nemours
- Previous posts: Bishop of Chartres (1620-1642)

Orders
- Consecration: 13 December 1620 by Henri de Gondi

Personal details
- Born: 6 February 1589 Château de Valençay, Duchy of Berry, Kingdom of France
- Died: 8 April 1651 (aged 62) Paris, Kingdom of France

Léonore d'Étampes de Valençay (6 February 1589, Château de Valençay – 8 April 1651, Paris) was Bishop of Chartres from June 1620 to November 1641, and Archbishop of Reims from 1641 until his death in 1651.

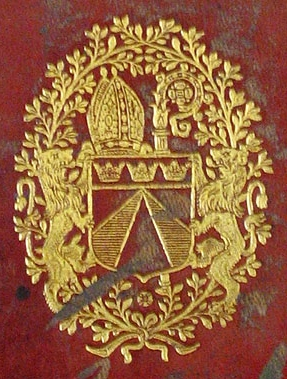
Official book stamp of Léonore d'Étampes de Valençay

He was the brother of Jacques d'Étampes de Valençay, Achille d'Étampes de Valençay, and Jean d'Étampes de Valençay.

== See also ==
- List of bishops of Chartres
