= Carlo Doria =

Italian general

Carlo
- Carlo Doria Palace
- Born: 1 August 1576; Genoa
- Died: 9 January 1650 (aged 73)
- Military career
- Allegiance: Spanish empire
- Rank: General
- Conflicts: Spanish–Ottoman wars; Battle of Chios (1621); Thirty Years' War; Relief of Genoa; War of the Mantuan Succession; battle of Veillane

Carlo Doria, 1st Duke of Tursi (1 August 1576 — 9 January 1650) was a Genoese general who fought for Spain during the War of Mantuan Succession.

== Biography ==
Carlo Doria was the second born son of Giovanni Andrea I Doria.

In 1595 his father gave him the Palazzo Doria Tursi in the Strada Nuova in Genova. In 1621 he commanded one wing during the Battle of Chios. Two years later he was in command of the Spanish Naval Squadron stuolo or squadra di Genova of Philip IV, and was involved in the Relief of Genoa in 1625. He was President of the Council of Italy and commandant of the Spanish fleet in Italy. Later he was Spanish ambassador to Vienna and at the Diet of Regensburg in 1630. In 1630 he fought and lost the battle of Veillane during the war of Mantuan Succession.

== See also ==
- Álvaro de Bazán, 2nd Marquis of Santa Cruz#The evolution of the title since the middle of the 17th century
