= Stamped =

Stamped may refer to:

- Stamped (song), by The Verve
- Stamped from the Beginning, a book by Ibram X. Kendi

== See also ==
- Stmpd Rcrds, a Dutch record label
- Stamp (disambiguation)
