= Stamp Creek =

Stream in Georgia, U.S.

Coordinates: 34°10′25″N 84°42′26″W

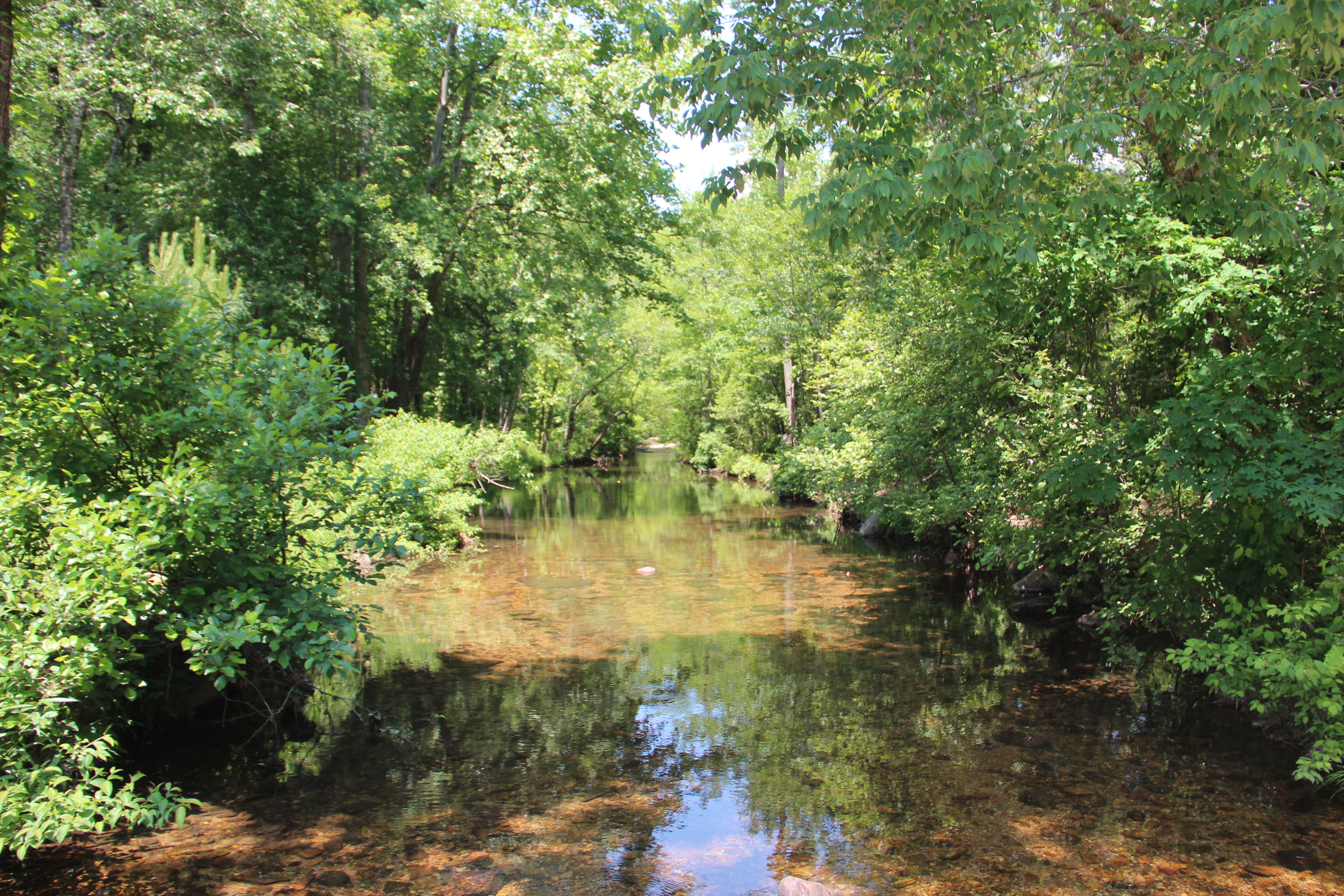
Stamp Creek in the Pine Log Wildlife Management Area

Stamp Creek is a stream in the U.S. state of Georgia. It empties into Lake Allatoona.

Stamp Creek was named from fact livestock stamped the ground at a nearby mineral lick.

== See also ==
- List of rivers of Georgia (U.S. state)
