= Achille d'Étampes de Valençay =

Achille d'Étampes de Valençay (5 July 1593 – 27 June 1646) was a French military leader, a Knight of Malta and later a Catholic cardinal.

== Early life ==
He was the brother of Jacques d'Étampes de Valençay, Léonore d'Étampes de Valençay, and Jean d'Étampes de Valençay.

He was made a Knight of Malta in 1606 at the age of 13 and became an officer of the galley. Thereafter he went to Paris where he earned a reputation as an impressive swordsman, though one regularly spoiling for a fight.

== Military career ==
Valençay served during the siege of Montauban (during the Huguenot rebellions) after which he was appointed captain of light horse of the king at the age of 28, with the rank of colonel.

In 1626, he foiled an attempted assassination of Cardinal Richelieu.

After contributing to the defense of the island of Ré during the Siege of Saint-Martin-de-Ré, Valençay commanded the Royal Navy during the Siege of La Rochelle in 1628 with the rank of Vice-Admiral. He was promoted to Brigadier at age 34.

Her served under Duke Henri II de Montmorency at the Battle of Avigliana and was awarded the Bailiff Grand Cross of the Order of Malta for his service, during which he was wounded. However, he fell into disgrace when he took up arms with the Duke who sought to raise an army against Cardinal Richelieu. The Duke was captured at the Battle of Castelnaudary and executed; Valençay escaped to Malta.

While there he, rather unsuccessfully, led forces against the Ottoman Empire. Nonetheless, he was thereafter employed by the Barberini to lead sections of the papal army during the Wars of Castro.

== Ecclesiastical career ==
In 1643 he was elevated to cardinal (in pectore - it was published the following year) by Pope Urban VIII who hoped that making a large number of French-aligned cardinals would allow his Cardinal-Nephew, Antonio Barberini, to control the College of Cardinals and elect a pope friendly to the Kingdom of France. Pope Urban died the following year and Achille d'Étampes de Valençay participated in the papal conclave of 1644. For a number of reasons, Urban's plan did not work and Pope Innocent X (more friendly to Spain than France) was elected.

Achille d'Étampes de Valençay was named Cardinal-Deacon of the Church of S. Adriano. He died on 27 June 1646 at Tours in France.
