= Stamps family =

American family

The Stamps family is an American ancestral group consisting of patrilineal descendants of 17th century Virginia colonists whose surnames were "Stampe," "Stamp," or "Stamps." During the late 18th century, Stamps descendants moved south and west from Virginia, eventually settling in Southern states like Georgia, Alabama, Kentucky, and Texas. Stamps men have volunteered for service during every American conflict since the French and Indian War.

== Origins ==
The Stamps surname is derived from the French region of Étampes, 30 miles (48 km) southwest of Paris. Eventually, bearers of this surname settled in London and anglicized their surname from "d'Étampes" to "Stampe." The first recorded spelling of the family name occurred in 1191. In that year, the Pipe Rolls of the City of London listed a "John de Stampes." Sir Thomas Stampe appears in the Feet of Fines for Essex, 1424.

== Arrival in America ==
One of the first Stamps in America was Thomas Stampe, who on May 15, 1635, left for Virginia from London aboard the "Plaine Joan" and quickly established himself in the New World. By August 1638, he controlled 200 acres (0.8 km^{2}) on the Nansamond River and 500 acres (2.0 km^{2}) of mostly swampland in James City County, where he operated a mill.

== French & Indian War ==
Dr. Timothy Stamps (1728–1800) was a physician who studied in Germany and England in the early 1750s. He volunteered as an ensign with the Fauquier County Militia, 1st Virginia Regiment during the French and Indian War and was promoted to captain. One family history states that at one point, he brought a sickly George Washington back to health. After the war, he acquired 1,600 acres (6 km^{2}) of Virginia land. When war broke out with Great Britain, he eventually became a major and was noted for supplying the colonial troops with homemade ammunition.

== Revolutionary War ==
Timothy's son, Thomas Stamps (1750–1840), volunteered as an ensign with the Halifax County Militia, 2nd Virginia Regiment during the American Revolution. He was promoted to captain. After the war, he moved to Georgia along with his father and son, where he purchased land. Later he participated in the 1820 Georgia land lottery and received 250 acres (1 km^{2}) in present-day Gwinnett County, northeast of Atlanta.

== War of 1812 ==
Moses Stamps (1772–1850) and Eason Stamps (1793–1895) were the son and grandson of Thomas Stamps, respectively. Moses volunteered as a captain during the War of 1812 and commanded his son Private Eason Stamps. Eason would later also fight in the 1836 Creek War as a captain. Both are buried in Coweta County The Atlanta Journal-Constitution wrote a short article about him in 1895, noting that he was 102 years old and was ill.

== Civil War ==
Many Stamps fought in the Confederate Army. The favorite sister of President Jefferson Davis, Lucinda Farrar Davis, married William Stamps in 1820. President Davis presented his nephew Isaac Davis Stamps (Lucinda Farrar Davis's son) with his presentation sword given to him by the Continental Congress of the Southern States at the outbreak of war to carry into battle. Captain Isaac Stamps was killed during the Battle of Gettysburg.

Fletcher Moreland Stamps was a farmer in Carrol Country, Georgia. When war broke out, he volunteered to serve as a medic in the 19th Georgia Infantry. The 19th began the war in Virginia, was transferred to Florida, and surrendered in May, 1865 in Greensboro, North Carolina.

Many published accounts of Confederate Veterans confuse Fletcher Moreland Stamps with his cousin, F.M. Stamps (killed in 1862 and buried in Atlanta's Oakland Cemetery). The records confusing F.M. Stamps with Fletcher Moreland Stamps extend to those kept in the Georgia Archives. Fletcher Moreland Stamps is buried at Salem Baptist Church near Bowden, Georgia. The church is on property donated by him, as he was one of three founders of the local Baptist church following the war. Several other Stamps are buried around the large monument identifying the family plot.

== World War I & II ==
To mention only two of the hundreds of other Stamps soldiers, Drure Fletcher Stamps served as an infantry chaplain during World War I and Lt. Col George M. Stamps piloted a B-17 during World War II. Col Stamps was one of the youngest pilots of the war. Roy Rupert Stamps served in the army during WWI and was stationed in France.

== Other notables ==
William Stamps Farish II, president of Standard Oil of New Jersey, the forerunner of Exxon, from 1937 to 1942, carries the Stamps name because his father was named for his great-uncle, CSA veteran William Stamps mentioned above.

The legendary gospel group, the Stamps Quartet, led by Frank Stamps in the 1920s produced the first ever southern gospel hit single "Give The World A Smile." Frank and his brother Virgil Oliver Stamps were posthumously inducted into the Southern Gospel Music Hall of Fame in 1997.

Professor Richard B. Stamps is an expert on the archeology and cultural anthropology of Taiwan and China.

Professor D. Sarah Stamps is an expert in geodesy and tectonics. She is also a National Geographic Explorer.

George Moreland Stamps, also mentioned above, is a principal developer of the modern fax machine.

Thomas Paty Stamps saved over 100 family-owned farms in Georgia and Texas as a result of federal bankruptcy litigation throughout the 1980s.

== Popular culture ==
Stamps, Arkansas, named for settler Hardy James Stamps, is the setting for Maya Angelou's autobiography I Know Why the Caged Bird Sings.

== See also ==
- Stamp (surname)
- Étampes
- Stamps Quartet
- Ashton Stamps (born 2005), American football player
