= Battle of Chios (1621) =

Battle between Christian and Muslim galleys in Chios

- Part of the Spanish–Ottoman wars
Date	March 20, 1621
Location	Chios, Aegean Sea
Result	Christian victory

Belligerents
Spanish Empire; Republic of Genoa; Grand Duchy of Tuscany; Order of St. John	Ottoman Empire; Eyalet of Tunis; Regency of Algiers

Commanders and leaders
Carlo Doria; Clemente Hidalgo	Ali Rostan; Sampson Denball; Mahomet Escabrig

Strength
13 galleys 1 galleon 1 nao	12 galleys 4 galiots 6 naos 3 tartane

Casualties and losses
84 dead	362 dead Many captured 1 galiot, 2 naos and 2 tartanes captured

The Battle of Chios of 1621 was a naval battle between a Spanish and Italian fleet and an Ottoman-Barbary fleet near the island of Chios. It concluded with a Christian victory.

== Background ==
In March 1621, six galleys from the Grand Duchy of Tuscany took refuge in the island of Hospitaller Malta against a sizable Ottoman armada sighted nearby. They came out joined by three galleys and a galleon from the Order of St. John, of which Grand Master Alof de Wignacourt had given command to Spanish knight Clemente Hidalgo to escort them. Two days later, they were also joined by a Flemish nao from the Spanish Netherlands, which thanks to its artillery and a timely wind had escaped from an encounter with the Ottoman fleet. The following day, the growing Christian fleet found two Spanish galleys from the Viceroyalty of Sicily and two Genoese galleys captained by Carlo Doria. The ships gathered in parliament and, judging their forces now enough to face the Ottoman armada, decided to seek and destroy it.

During the search, approaching the Aegean Sea, they captured an Ottoman tartane sent to scout their movements. From its crewmen they found out the enemy fleet was composed by 12 Ottoman galleys captained by Ali Rostam, 6 naos from English renegade Sampson Denball, and 4 galiots and 3 more tartanas by Mahomet Escabrig, a Turkish corsair based in the Regency of Algiers and known as the Bravo de Argel ("The Brave Algerian") among the Spanish, all of them carrying by Janissaries. On 20, the Christian armada found its Ottoman counterpart in front of the harbor of the Chios island.

== Battle ==
Sighting happened by sunset, leading both fleets to wait overnight before engaging. The Christian fleet capitalized on the chance to add twelve knights of St. John to the crew of the Flemish ship, where they hid in a plan they conceived. The Christians placed the Maltese galleon and the Netherlander ship at the center, the Tuscan galleys at the right wing and the rest of them at the left wing, while the Muslims opened in half moon formation. The fleets started exchanging artillery fire, and four hours they fired at each other without any achieving the advantage. The Ottoman right attempted a boarding against the Christian left which was rejected.

As the battle raged, three Maltese galleys boarded Mahomet's flagship before being beaten back, and meanwhile the opposite happened when the Muslims boarded the Flemish ship, where the of St. John knight unveiled their plan. They pretended to surrender, and as the Ottoman boarding crews entered freely, the knight came out of their hiding places and attacked by surprise, killing many and forcing many other to jump overboard, several of them drowning. The battle went back and forth, with a group of Tuscan marine infantry leading a daring boarding of several Ottoman ships before being cut off and eventually killed, although managing to capture and bring back one of Sampson's ships. Doria pressed against Mahomet's ships with the Genoese and Spanish galleys. Finally, Rostam and the rest of Ottoman captains called for retreat and retired to the harbor of Chios.

== Aftermath ==
After the Christian fleet's return to the western Mediterranean, seven French galleys raided Algiers, capturing six Barbary ships and freeing 310 prisoners.
