= Jacques d'Étampes de Valençay =

Jacques d'Étampes de Valençay (born c. 1585, Château de Valençay; died ? ) held the French honorific titles Lord of Valençay and Grand Marshal of the Dwelling House of the King. d'Étampes de Valençay was Governor of Calais, and made a Knight of the Holy Spirit in 1619.

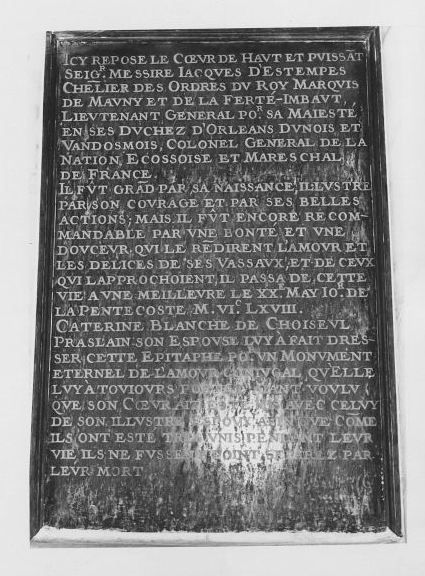
Commemorative plaque displaying epitaph of Jacques d'Étampes de Valençay

He was the son of Jacques d'Étampes de Valençay, and brother of Léonore d'Étampes de Valençay, Achille d'Étampes de Valençay, and Jean d'Étampes de Valençay.
