= Lisa Stamp =

New Zealand academic

Lisa Stamp FRSNZ
- Education: University of Adelaide
- Scientific career
- Fields: Rheumatology
- Workplaces: University of Otago
- Thesis: T lymphocyte cyclooxygenase isotypes and the role of T lymphocytes in modulating monocyte and synoviocyte cyclooxygenase expression (2003)

Lisa Katrina Stamp FRSNZ is a New Zealand academic, and as of 2019 is a full professor at the University of Otago.

== Academic career ==
After a 2003 PhD titled T lymphocyte cyclooxygenase isotypes and the role of T lymphocytes in modulating monocyte and synoviocyte cyclooxygenase expression at the University of Adelaide, Stamp moved to the University of Otago, rising to full professor.

Much of Stamp's research is on rheumatology and gout.

== Honours and awards ==
In 2011, Stamp received the Rowheath Trust Award and Carl Smith Medal from the University of Otago. The award is given in recognition of "outstanding research performance of Early Career Staff".

In 2022, she was elected a Fellow of the Royal Society of New Zealand.

== Selected works ==
- Stamp, Lisa K., William J. Taylor, Peter B. Jones, Jo L. Dockerty, Jill Drake, Christopher Frampton, and Nicola Dalbeth. "Starting dose is a risk factor for allopurinol hypersensitivity syndrome: a proposed safe starting dose of allopurinol." Arthritis & Rheumatism 64, no. 8 (2012): 2529–2536.
- Stamp, Lisa K., John L. O'donnell, Mei Zhang, Jill James, Christopher Frampton, Murray L. Barclay, and Peter T. Chapman. "Using allopurinol above the dose based on creatinine clearance is effective and safe in patients with chronic gout, including those with renal impairment." Arthritis & Rheumatism 63, no. 2 (2011): 412–421.
- Stamp, Lisa K., Michael J. James, and Leslie G. Cleland. "Diet and rheumatoid arthritis: a review of the literature." In Seminars in arthritis and rheumatism, vol. 35, no. 2, pp. 77–94. WB Saunders, 2005.
- Dalrymple, Judith M., Lisa K. Stamp, John L. O'Donnell, Peter T. Chapman, Mei Zhang, and Murray L. Barclay. "Pharmacokinetics of oral methotrexate in patients with rheumatoid arthritis." Arthritis & Rheumatism: Official Journal of the American College of Rheumatology 58, no. 11 (2008): 3299–3308.
