= Vendômois =

The Vendômois (French pronunciation: [vɑ̃domwa]) is a traditional area of France equivalent to the arrondissement of Vendôme, to the north of Loir-et-Cher, and on both sides of Loir.
