= Battle of Veillane =

Battle of the War of the Mantuan Succession

- Part of War of the Mantuan Succession
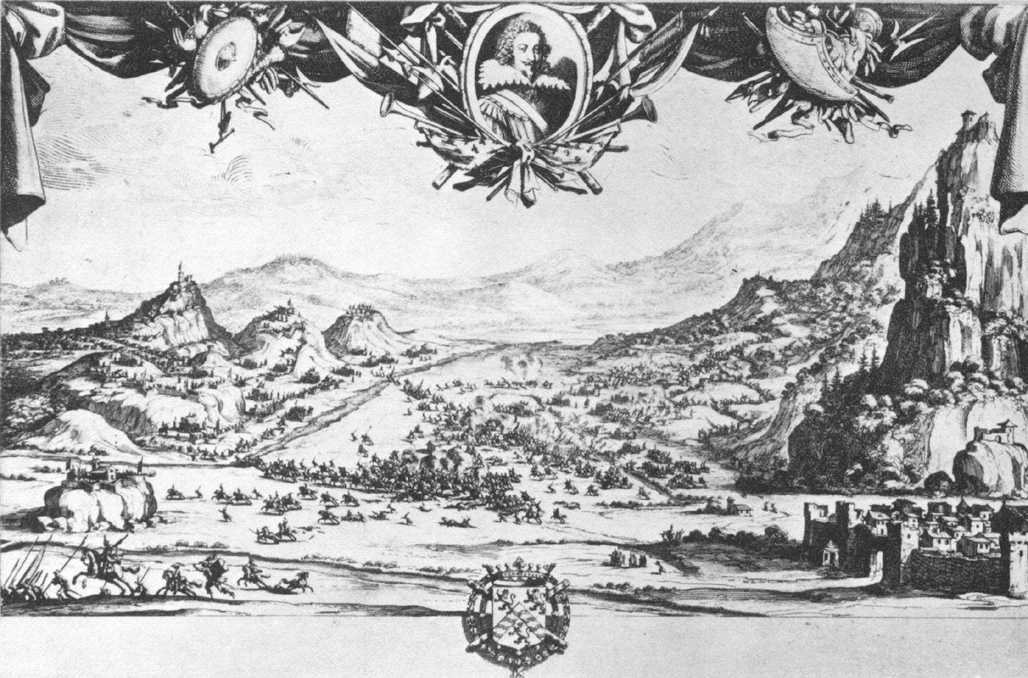
- The Battle of Avigliana by Jacques Callot
Date	10 July 1630
Location	Avigliana, Piedmont, Northern Italy
Result	French victory

Belligerents
France	Spain; Savoy

Commanders and leaders
(Kingdom of France) Henri II de Montmorency	(Spain) Carlo Doria (POW)

Strength
10,000 to 12,000	18,000

Casualties and losses
400 killed and wounded	1,000 killed and wounded

The Battle of Veillane (or the Battle of Avigliana) was fought on 10 July 1630 between a French army under the command of Henri II de Montmorency and a Spanish army under the command of Don Carlo Doria. The result was a French victory.

== Prelude ==
During the war of the Mantuan Succession, Cardinal Richelieu sent a French army under the command of Montmorency to invade duke of Savoy's piedmontese countries in attempt to influence the Mantuan succession. This was the casus belli but his primary motive was to force Charles Emmanuel I, Duke of Savoy from his alliance the Habsburgs (Philip IV of Spain and Ferdinand II, Holy Roman Emperor) and hence sever the land link between Habsburg lands in Italy and those in Germany and the Spanish Netherlands.

== Battle ==
The French commander, General Montmorency, led the royal gendarmes in a charge across a ditch, capturing Doria with his own hand and reportedly fighting like a common soldier until the Spanish withdrawal from the field. The French inflicted about 700 on the enemy and captured 600.

== Aftermath ==
Although this victory did not prevent Savoy and its allies from capturing Mantua a week later, the French victory was followed by the raising of the siege of Casale and the taking of Saluzzo and Pignerol. For his achievements during the Piedmont Campaign Montmorency was appointed a Marshal of France later the same year.

The outcome of the Piedmont Campaign reversed earlier French strategic losses and the Treaty of Cherasco signed in 1631 was largely favourable to France.
