= Château de Valençay =

Château in Centre-Val de Loire, France

Coordinates: 47.1576°N 1.5633°E

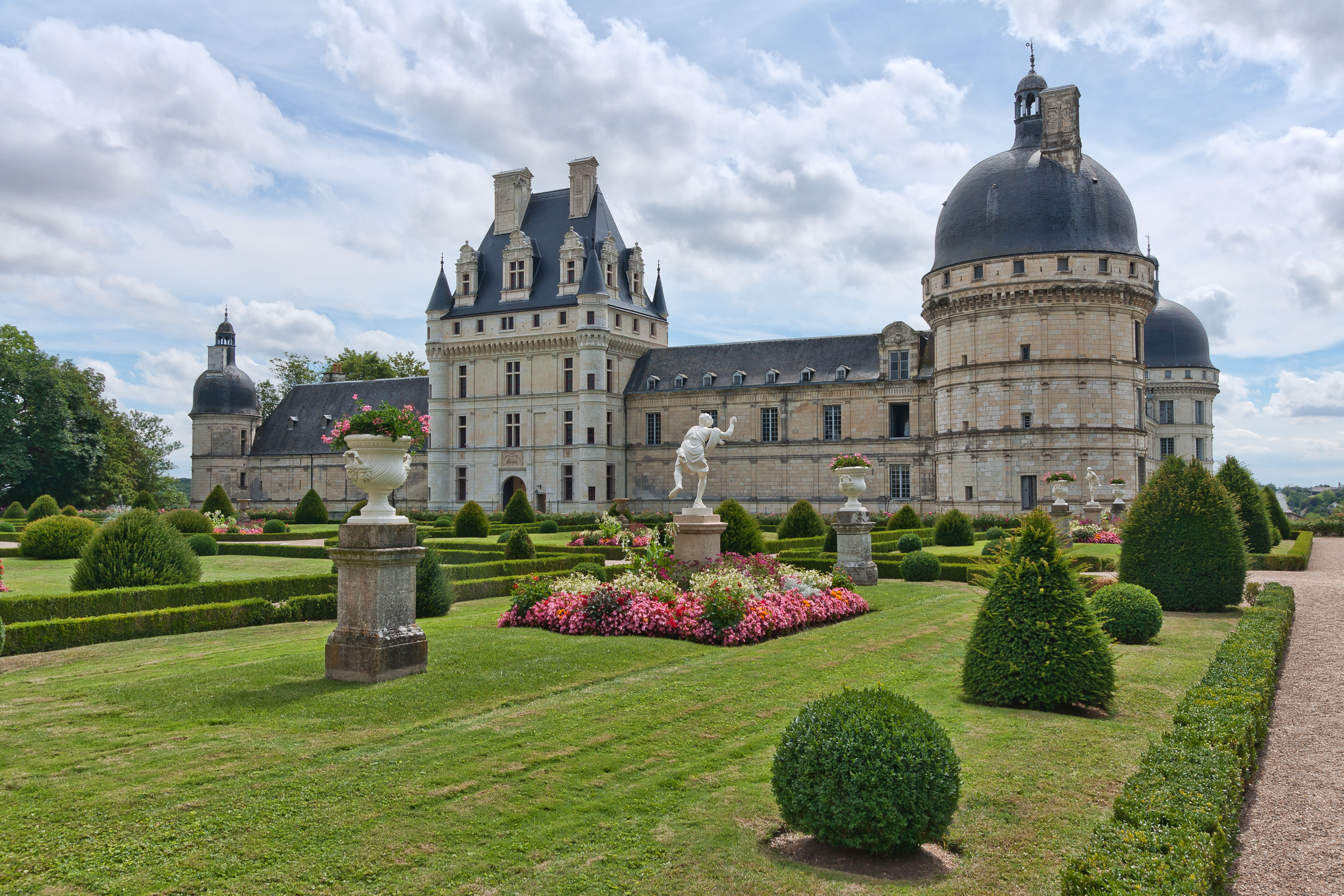
Chateau de Valençay

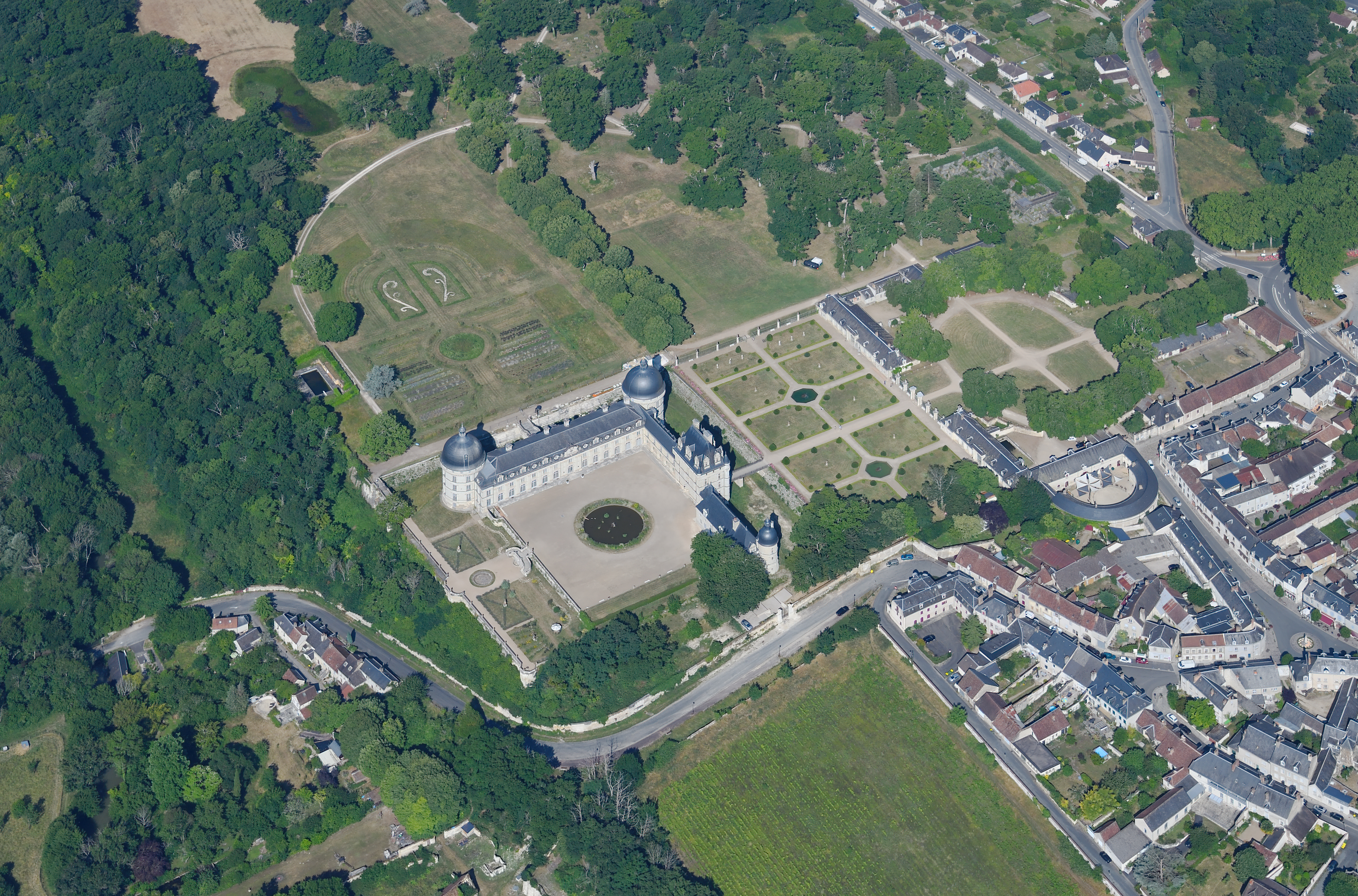
Aerial view of Château de Valençay and its park

Château de Valençay is a château in the commune of Valençay, in the Indre department of France. It was a residence of the d'Estampes and Talleyrand-Périgord families. Although it is part of the province of Berry, its architecture invites comparison with the Renaissance châteaux of the Loire Valley, notably the Château de Chambord. The manor was praised as "one of the most beautiful on earth" by George Sand, who also noted that "no king has owned a more picturesque park".

== History ==
Château de Valençay is located at the edge of a plateau overlooking the Nahon River. In ancient times, the site of the château was home to a Gallo-Roman villa called Valenciacus, the domain of Valens. By the 10th or 11th century, a "heavy and massive tower" had been built, and between 1026 and 1047, a donation charter deeded Valençay to its first recorded lord, Bertrand. In 1220, the then lord of Valençay, Gauthier, was reported to have built a feudal castle or house on the site, but it is unclear if this was an addition or an extension to the earlier tower. There are remains of the original structure buried under the courtyard.

The modern château was built on a royal scale by the Estampes family of financiers over a period of some 200 years. Construction started in 1540 at the behest of Jacques d'Estampes in place of the demolished 12th-century castle and was not completed until the 18th century when the south tower was added.

The 18th century saw a rapid succession of owners, including the notorious Scottish banker John Law, who purchased the estate in 1719. Nearly a century later, in 1803, Napoleon ordered his foreign minister Charles Maurice de Talleyrand to acquire the property as a place particularly appropriate for the reception of foreign dignitaries, notably Ferdinand VII of Spain, his brother Infante Carlos, Count of Molina and his uncle Infante Antonio Pascual, who would spend six years in Napoleonic captivity at Valençay. The treaty providing for their release in 1813 took the estate's name. Talleyrand took Marie-Antoine Carême as his chef.

The period of Talleyrand's occupancy was the golden age in the history of Valençay, with twenty-three communes reportedly administered by the ruling prince. Undoubtedly the most celebrated of Talleyrand's servants employed at Valençay was his chef, Marie-Antoine Carême. After Talleyrand's death in 1838, the great statesman was buried in a small mortuary chapel in the park. His collateral descendants retained the estate's ownership until 1952 when the male line ended. The last prince bequeathed the property to his stepson, who sold it to an association of historic chateaux in 1979.

The Princes of Talleyrand-Périgord ranked among the mediatized German nobility by virtue of their nominal control of the duchy of Sagan in Prussian Silesia (now in Poland). On this technicality, the château was spared the German occupation during the Second World War. Having established his personal neutrality, the Duke of Sagan saw treasures from the Louvre (like the Winged Victory of Samothrace and the Venus de Milo) safely sheltered at Valençay.

== Features ==
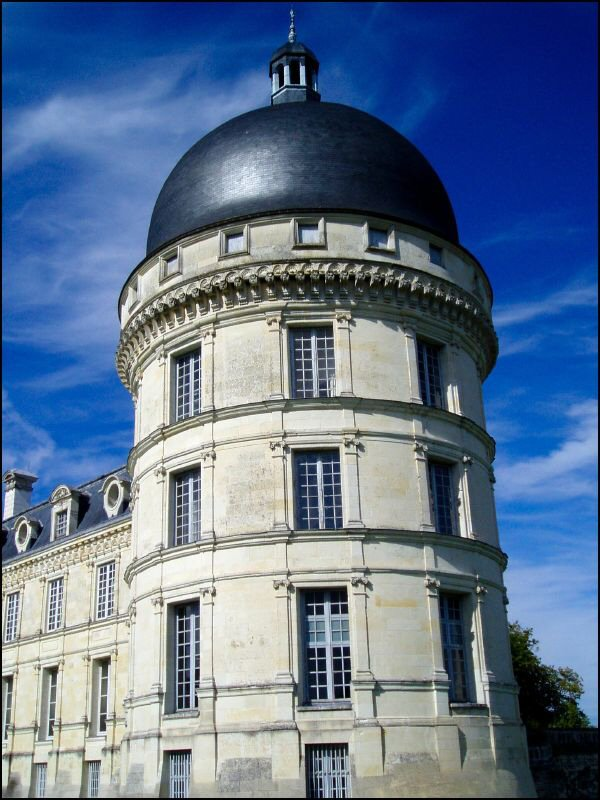
Angle tower of the Château de Valençay

Relics of the 16th century include an outsized round tower at the western corner, capped by a dome à l'impériale, and the central block in the shape of a donjon, with a slender tower on each corner, grouped around the raking roof. Its feigned battlements are evocative of the Middle Ages, a retrospective formula stylistically derived from Chambord but somewhat vitiated by ample fenestration, including characteristic Renaissance dormers.

The exterior has withstood time and the elements remarkably well. It is clothed in classical orders: the Doric order on the ground floor, the Ionic order on the first floor, and the Corinthian order on the second. This was an innovative feature anticipating French classicism. An arcaded gallery rings the courtyard. The western wing, with its Mansard roof, dates from the 17th century.

Talleyrand's château boasts one of the most advanced interiors of the Empire style anywhere. There are a hundred rooms, of which a quarter comprises Talleyrand's apartments. A room of King Ferdinand is also shown to tourists. The western wing contains the Talleyrand Museum, formerly housed in outbuildings.

The formal French gardens, dating from the early 20th century, cover about forty hectares, not counting the area of Talleyrand's vineyards. Llamas, peacocks, and other exotic animals kept in the park provide amusements for tourists.
