= List of ambassadors of France to England =

This is a list of French ambassadors to England. Note that during much of this period there was no set ambassador, with frequent periods of lagging relations.

== French diplomats to the Kingdom of England ==
Image	From	Until	Ambassadors
	1526	1535	Charles de Solier, comte de Morette
	1535	1537	Antoine de Castelnau
	1537	1538	Louis de Perreau, Sieur de Castillon
	1538	1543	Charles de Marillac
	1543	1546	Aymar Chaste
	1546	1548	Odet de Selve
	1553	1556	Antoine de Noailles, 1st comte de Noailles
	1556	1557	François de Noailles
	1558	1559	Gilles de Noailles (Note: As French agent.)
	1560	1562	Michel de Sèvre (Note: As Ambassador Extraordinary.)
	1562	1566	Paul de Foix de Carmain
	1566	1568	Jacques Bochetel de la Forest
	1568	1574	Bertrand de Salignac de la Mothe-Fénelon
	1574	1584	Michel de Castelnau, Seigneur de Mauvissiére
	1585	1589	Guillaume de l'Aubespine de Châteauneuf
	1589	1592	Aymar Chaste (Note: Due to the War of the Three Henrys and "the disputed succession after the assassination of King Henry III in 1589 it is difficult to follow exactly the French Resident Amabassadors in England from this date onwards.")
	1602	1605	Christophe de Harlay, Count of Beaumont
	1606	1613	Antoine Lefèvre de la Boderie
	1611	1615	Samuel Spifame, Sieur des Bisseaux
	1615	1618	Gaspard Dauvet, Sieur des Marets
	1618	1621	Honoré d'Albret de Cadenet
	1625	1625	Jean de Varigniez, Sieur de Blainville
	1626	1627	François de Bassompierre, Marshal of France
	1629	1630	Charles de L'Aubespine, Marquis of Châteauneuf
	1630	1633	François du Val de Fontenay-Mareuil, Marquis of Fontenay Mareuil
	1633	1635	Jean d'Angennes, Marquis de Poygni
	1635	1637	Henri I de Saint-Nectaire
	1637	1640	Pompone de Bellièvre
	1640	1641	Jean de Montereul
	1641	1643	Jacques d'Estampes de La Ferté-Imbert
	1645	1650	Jean de Montereul
	1652	1660	Antoine de Bordeaux, seigneur de Neufville
	1661	1662	Godefroi, Comte d'Estrades
	1662	1665	François de Comminges
	1665	1668	Henri de Bourbon, Duke of Verneuil
	1668	1674	Charles Colbert, Marquis de Croissy (Note: M. Colbert initially served only as a spy, since M. Rouvigny was not trusted by the French court; hence the overlap.)
	1674	1677	Henri de Massue, 1st Marquis de Rouvigny
	1677	1688	Paul Barillon

== See also ==
- List of ambassadors of France to the Kingdom of Great Britain
- List of ambassadors of France to the United Kingdom
