= Barthélemy Mercier de Saint-Léger =

French abbot and librarian

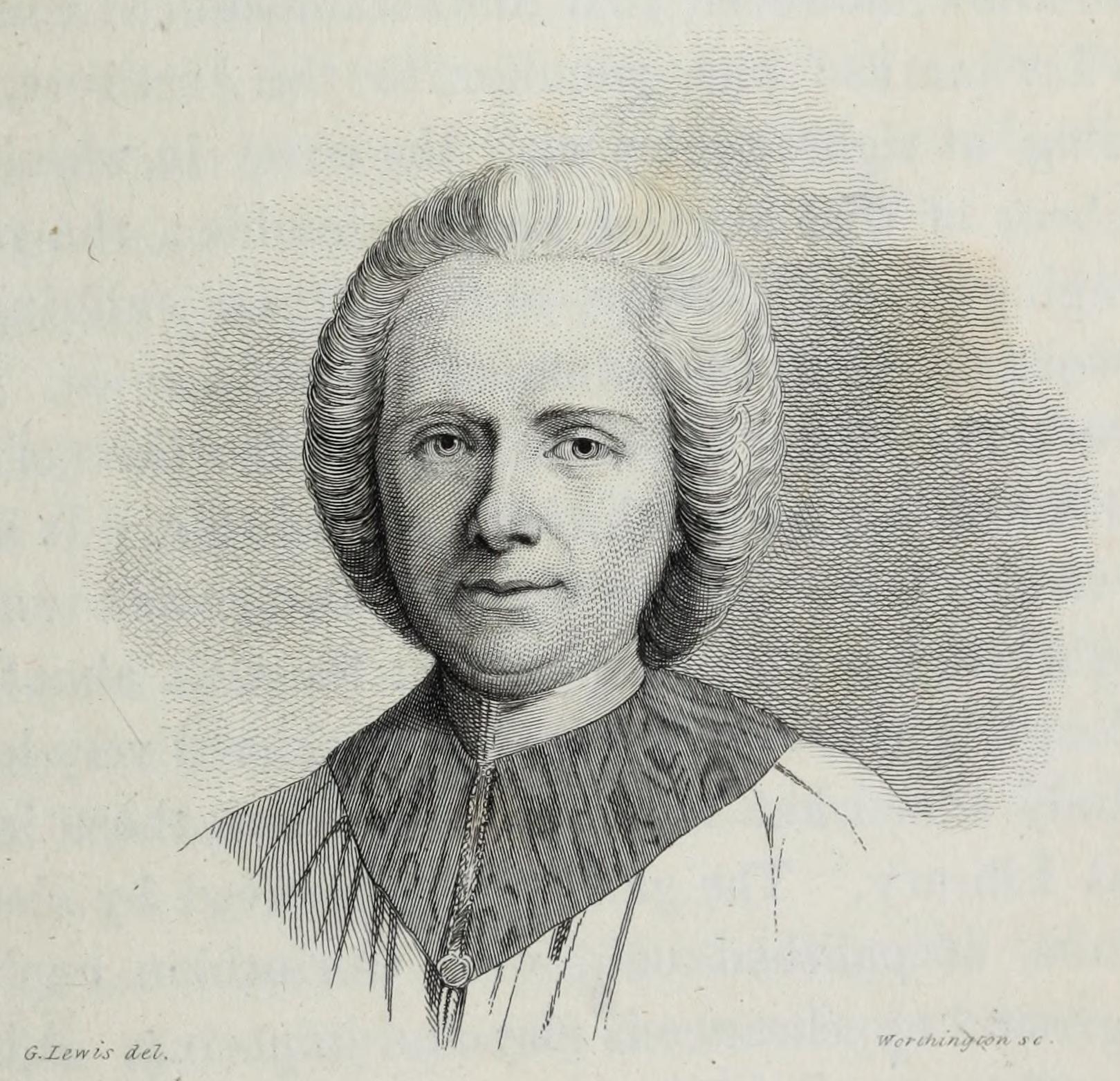
Barthélemy Mercier de Saint-Léger

Barthélemy Mercier de Saint-Léger (4 April 1734, Lyon – 13 May 1799, Paris) was a French abbot and librarian.

== Publications ==
1. Lettres sur la Bibliographie instructive de M. Debure, 1763;
2. Lettre de M. Mercier,… à M. Capperonnier,… sur l’approbation donnée au second volume de la ″Bibliographie instructive″, 12 September 1764;
3. Notice du livre intitulé : ″Reformatorium vitae morumque et honestatis clericorum″ (de Jacques Philippi, curé de St-Pierre, à Bâle), imprimé à Bâle, chez Michel Furter, sous la fausse daté de 1444, 1764;
4. Lettre sur un Nouveau Dictionnaire historique portatif qui s’imprime à Avignon, 1766 (examen critique du dictionnaire de Chaudon);
5. Supplément à l’Histoire de l’imprimerie de Prosper Marchand Paris, 1772, in-4°; nouvelle édition, corrigée et augmentée, 1775, in-4°;
6. Consultations pour les prêtres séculiers pourvus des cures de Saint-Étienne-du-Mont et de Saint-Médard… dépendantes de l’abbaye royale de Sainte Geneviève… sur la question de savoir : 1 ̊ si les religieux de Sainte Geneviève sont ou ne sont point chanoines réguliers ? 2 ̊ s’ils sont ou s’ils ne sont pas capables de posséder des cures ?, 1772;
7. Lettre de M. l’A. [abbé] de S. L. [Saint-Léger] à l'auteur de l'Année littéraire, en lui envoyant la notice d’un livre rare intitulé : ″La Peau-de-bœuf″, 14 décembre 1775;
8. Nouvelles remarques critiques sur les deux premiers volumes de la ″Bibliothèque générale des écrivains de l’Ordre de S. Benoît″, 1778;
9. Observations sur la lettre de M. J. G***, insérée dans ″l’Esprit des journaux″ du mois de juin dernier, avec une notice de quelques éditions faites à Bruges, par Colard Mansion, durant le XVe siècle, 26 août 1779;
10. Réplique de M. l’abbé M.***, à la Réponse de l’un des 36, adressée aux auteurs du ″Journal de Paris″, 8 octobre 1781;
11. Lettres au baron de H[eiss] sur les différentes éditions rares du XVe siècle, Paris, 1783
12. Description d’une nouvelle presse exécutée pour le service du Roi et publiée par ordre du gouvernement, 1783;
13. Extrait d’un manuscrit intitulé : ″Le Livre du très chevalereux comte d’Artois et de sa femme, fille du comte de Boulogne″, inséré dans la Bibliothèque des romans, 1783;
14. Notice raisonnée des ouvrages de Gaspar Schott, jésuite, contenant des observations curieuses sur la physique expérimentale, l’histoire naturelle et les arts, Paris, 1785, in-8°.
15. Particularités littéraires sur la liturgie mosarabe tirées des lettres manuscrites du P. Burriel, 26 septembre 1786;
16. Lettre à un ami sur la suppression de la charge de bibliothécaire du Roi, et sur un moyen d’y suppléer, aussi économique qu’avantageux aux lettres, 1787;
17. Notice du cahier original de la noblesse assemblée à Orléans pour les États généraux de 1614; adressée aux rédacteurs de l'"Analyse des papiers anglais", 10 juillet 1788;
18. Lettre de M. A***, négociant de Rouen, à Dom A***, religieux de la Congrégation de Saint-Maur, sur le projet de décret concernant les religieux, proposé à l’Assemblée nationale par M. Treilhard, 1789;
19. Lettre à l’éditeur du Traité des monnaies des prélats et barons de France (Tobiesen Duby), dans le Journal des savants, 1789
20. Mémoire pour la conservation des bibliothèques des communautés séculières et régulières de Paris, 1790, in-8°;
21. Notice de deux anciens catalogues des éditions d’Aldus Manutius et de deux autres pièces intéressantes, imprimées par cet artiste célèbre, adressées à MM. les auteurs du ″Journal des sçavans″, 29 mars 1790, in-12;
22. Projet pour l’établissement d’une Bibliothèque nationale en cinq sections, placées dans autant de quartiers de Paris, 15 février 1791;
23. Quinque illustrium poetarum : Ant. Panormitae, Ramusii Ariminensis, Pacifici Maximi,… Joan. Joviani,… Joan. Secundi,… lusus in Venerem, partim ex codicibus manuscriptis, nunc primum editi, 1791;
24. Opinion sur de prétendues prophéties qu’on applique aux événements présents, ibid., 1791;
25. Note sur l’exemplaire acquis récemment par la Bibliothèque Mazarine de l’Acerba de Cecco d’Ascoli, seconde édition de 1478, 26 germinal an VI;
26. Lettre de M*** aux auteurs des ″Mémoires pour l’histoire des sciences et beaux-arts″, touchant les nouveaux écrits sur le véritable auteur du ″Testament politique″ du cardinal de Richelieu, slnd;
27. Lettre de M. Mercier, abbé de St Léger… à MM. les auteurs du ″Journal des sçavants″ contenant diverses remarques critiques sur son ″Supplément à l’histoire de l’imprimerie de P. Marchand″, slnd;
28. Lettre de M. Mercier bibliothécaire de Sainte Geneviève à Monsieur Capperonnier, slnd;
29. Notice des tombeaux et autres monumens transférés, en septembre 1783, de l’église de Sainte-Catherine de la Couture dans celle de Saint-Louis, rue Saint-Antoine, précédée de la nomenclature des principaux personnages inhumés dans cette église, slnd;
30. différents Opuscules dont on trouvera les titres dans la France littéraire de Ersch et dans le Dictionnaire des Dictionnaire des ouvrages anonymes et pseudonymes, by Barbier

Mercier has left Notes on the works by La Monnoye, the Mémoires by Jean-Pierre Niceron, the Bibliothèque by David Clément, the Bibliographie by Debure, the Soirées littéraires by Coupé, the Biblioth. mediœ et infini, latinitatis by Johann Albert Fabricius, the Bibliothèques by La Croix du Maine and Antoine du Verdier, etc., and two volumes of Notices sur les poètes latins du moyen âge, jusqu'à l’an 1520 . M. Parison promettait de publier, sous le titre de Merceriana, les notes détachées trouvées dans les papiers de Mercier; et Chardon de la Rochette assure que c’eût été, après le Menagiana, le recueil le plus curieux de ce genre.
