= Lancelot de Carle =

French scholar, poet and diplomat

- Bishop of Riez
- Church: Catholic Church
- Diocese: Riez
- Elected: 1550
- Term ended: 1568

Personal details
- Born: c.1508 Bordeaux, France
- Died: July 1568 (aged 59–60) Paris
- Denomination: Roman Catholic
- Parents: Jean de Carle; Jacquette de Constantin

Lancelot de Carle, also Carles (French: [lɑ̃slo də kaʁl]; c. 1508 – July 1568), Bishop of Riez, was a French scholar, poet and diplomat. He was in London in 1536, in the service of the French Ambassador, Antoine de Castelnau. Carle was an eyewitness to the trial and execution of Anne Boleyn, Queen consort of Henry VIII, and shortly afterwards, he wrote a poem detailing her life and the circumstances surrounding her death.

== Family ==
Lancelot de Carle was the son of Jean de Carle, seigneur de Peyrissac, and Jacquette, daughter of Baude de Constantin, who married in Bordeaux in 1500 and had three sons and a daughter:

- Pierre de Carle
- Francois de Carle
- Lancelot de Carle
- Marguerite de Carle, widow of Jean Arsac, married Étienne de La Boétie.

His father was a lawyer and second president of the Parlement Bordeaux from 1519 to 1521. His two brothers distinguished themselves in local government service. Carle was related by marriage to Étienne de La Boétie and Montaigne.

His father died before 1556, his mother died around December 1556 in Bordeaux.

== Career ==
=== Poet ===
Lancelot de Carle wrote verses in French, Latin as well as Italian, and was recognised in his lifetime as an accomplished poet. He also translated biblical and classical texts. He socialized in literary circles, and was esteemed by La Pléiade. Both Pierre de Ronsard and Joachim du Bellay dedicated works to him

Carle is best known for a 1,318-line poem about the life and death of Anne Boleyn, the second wife of Henry VIII. The poem, Épistre Contenant le Procès Criminel Faict à l'Encontre de la Royne Anne Boullant d'Angleterre, (A Letter Containing the Criminal Charges Laid Against Queen Anne Boleyn of England), is dated 2 June 1536, but not published until 1545. It was written in 1536, while Carle was in London, serving as secretary to Antoine de Castelnau, ambassador to the court of Henry VIII. Since Francis I soon became aware of the circumstances, the poem may have begun as a diplomatic report. The poem relates Anne Boleyn's early life, as well as the arrests, trials and executions of the Queen and her co-accused, in May 1536. It proclaims that it relates matters heard from a variety of sources in England, but does not name them, nor address their veracity, and it contains a number of factual errors that Carle could have checked.

Thirteen extant copies remain of Lancelot de Carle's poem: two printed versions and eleven manuscripts. They are held in the British Library, the Royal Library of Belgium, the Bibliothèque nationale de France and departmental archives in Bordeaux, Soissons and Valenciennes. Although the two printed copies are identical, none of the manuscripts precisely matches any of the others. The history of some of the versions remains unclear; no documentary evidence establishes that any of them is Carle's original. Georges Ascoli, a French literary scholar, examined most of the extant versions of the poem in 1920, and selected one that he believed closest to Carle's original. Ascoli included a transcript of the manuscript version in the Bibliothèque Nationale known as f. fr. 12795. The transcript in Georges Ascoli's La Grande-Bretagne Devant l'Opinion Française, Depuis la Guerre de Cent Ans Jusqu'à la Fin du XVIe siècle includes a line-by-line listing of all the variations between f. fr. 12795 and the other versions, along with some explanatory notes. There is a complete English translation of Lancelot de Carle's poem in Susan Walters Schmid's Anne Boleyn, Lancelot de Carle, and the Uses of Documentary Evidence. An English summary of the poem can be found among the Letters and Papers of the Reign of Henry VIII and in Elizabeth Norton's Anne Boleyn: In Her Own Words & the Words of Those Who Knew Her.

As a detailed description of the events surrounding Anne Boleyn's arrest, trial and execution, the poem has become an invaluable resource to biographers and historians, although debate continues over its accuracy and significance. Until recently, it was generally accepted that Lancelot de Carle was not present at Anne Boleyn's trial and execution, but that another Frenchman, Crispin de Milherve, was an eyewitness. In The Sunday Times review: The Lady in the Tower: The Fall of Anne Boleyn by Alison Weir 1 November 2009, John Guy argued that French scholars had demonstrated that Lancelot de Carle and Crispin de Milherve were the same man.

"Weir believes that a separate poem by another Frenchman, an eyewitness at Anne's trial, one Crispin de Miherve, corroborates de Carles and adds extra details. Unfortunately, Crispin is a phantom. A French scholar proved in 1844 that the text Weir is using had been doctored, and in 1927 it was shown by comparing all the genuine manuscripts that the two poems are identical and by de Carles. Weir has been duped."

More groundbreakingly, in 2010, Professor George W. Bernard, from the University of Southampton, suggested that the letter proves that Anne Boleyn could indeed be guilty of the adultery she was accused of. Although the poem was not published until 1545, it was widely circulated previously. Whether or not Carle was involved in its distribution or later publication is unclear. In June 1537, after Carle had returned to France, Henry VIII learned about the poem and wrote to Stephen Gardiner, his ambassador in Paris:

Has received his sundry letters, ... "with the French book, written in form of a tragedy, sent unto us by the same," ... Wonders that on his first having knowledge of the said book and the malice of it, he did not apply to the French king to have it suppressed. As sundry copies and impressions of it have got abroad, Gardiner is to tell the French king and the Great Master how much Henry is grieved that it should have been written in the house of his ambassador in England, "and now there (in France?) imprinted." Is to urge that all copies may be taken in and suppressed, leaving the punishment of the, devisers to their discretion. Understands that the author was one Carle, attendant upon the French ambassador.

It is unknown whether or not Lancelot de Carle or anyone else was punished by the French king.

=== Royal service ===
Carle's royal service included positions as secretary to the French ambassador to the court of Henry VIII in 1536, and later as almoner to Francis I and in 1545 to the dauphin of France (the future Henry II). Carle also served as a royal councillor as well as advised both Charles, Cardinal of Lorraine and Catherine de Medici. In 1547, Carle travelled to Rome to reconcile the Pope and the French king. As a reward for that service, Carle was appointed Bishop of Riez, Alpes-de-Haute-Provence in 1550.

He was granted his bulls by Pope Julius III on 28 September 1550; in the bull, he is referred to as clericus (i.e. not yet a priest), Councillor and Almoner of Henri II. In accordance with the decrees of the Council of Trent, he established in the Chapter of his Cathedral an office called the Theologus, who was a member of the Order of Preachers. He also undertook the interior decoration of his newly built cathedral, which featured paintings in the sanctuary and apse; these were destroyed by the iconoclastic Huguenots a decade after his death. Carle went on a second mission to Italy in 1554. Unlike many bishops of the time, Carle spent a great deal of his time in his episcopal see, and also worked to quell civil unrest in Provence. In October and November 1564, Bishop de Carle participated in the Colloquy of Poissy, a futile attempt on the part of the Crown to bring about agreement between Catholics and Huguenots. During his last years, however, he retired to Paris, which, according to Joseph-Hyacinthe Albanès, worked to the detriment of his diocese, where the absence of the bishop facilitated the growth of heresy.

== Works ==
Antoine du Verdier described Lancelot de Carle as an "excellent poet in Latin and French and well learned in Greek". A number of works are attributed to him:

- L'Odyssée d'Homère. A translation into French of Homer's Odyssey, attributed to Carle by La Croix du Main.
- Les Blasons du Corps Féminin. Paris.(1543). He collaborated with Clément Marot and Michel d'Amboise in the drafting of this collection.
- Discours Anonymes et Poèmes sur Anne de Boleyn. 1536–1544 A collection of texts, some of which are anonymous, and poems about Anne Boleyn.
- Epistre Contenant le Procès Criminel Faict a l'Encontre de la Royne Anne Boullant d'Angleterre. Lyon. 1545. A Poem detailing the life, the trial and execution of Anne Boleyn, Queen Consort of Henry VIII.
- "Éloge ou Témoignage d'Honneur de Henri II, Roi de France". In Paschal, Pierre. Henrici II, Galliarum Regis Elogium, Cum Ejus Verissime Expressa Effigie, Paris, 1560.. Praise and testimony of honour of Henry II, King of France. A translation into French from the Latin of Pierre Paschal.
- Exhortation ou Parénèse en Vers Héroïques Latins et Français à Son Neveu, Paris, Vascosan, 1560. An Admonition or exhortation in heroic verse, in both Latin and French, to his nephew, Jean de Carle.
- La Paraphrase en Vers François de l'Ecclésiaste de Salomon, 1561
- Cantiques de la Bible, 1562
- Cantique des Cantiques, 1562
- Lettres au Roi de France, Charles IX, Contenant les Actions et Propos de M. de Guyse, Depuis sa Blessure jusqu'à son Trépas, Paris, 1563. Letters to the King of France, Charles IX, containing the actions and words of M. de Guise, since his injury until his death.

== Death ==
He died in Paris in July 1568. In his will, dated 19 May 1557, Lancelot de Carle left his property to Francois de Carle, his nephew and eldest son of Pierre de Carle.

== Music ==
Wilhelm Killmayer set one of his poems in his song cycle Blasons anatomiques du corps féminin in 1968.

== Sources ==
- Albanés, Joseph Hyacinthe; Ulysse Chevalier (1899). Gallia christiana novissima: Aix, Apt, Fréjus, Gap, Riez et Sisteron (in Latin). Montbéliard: Société anonyme d'imprimerie montbéliardaise.
- Ascoli, Georges (1927). La Grande-Bretagne Devant l'Opinion Française, Depuis la Guerre de Cent Ans Jusqu'à la Fin du XVIe Siècle. Paris: J. Gamber.
- Bernard, G. W. (2011). Anne Boleyn: Fatal Attractions. New Haven; London: Yale University Press. ISBN 9780300170894.
- Carle, Lancelot de (1545). Epistre Contenant le Procès Criminel Faict a l'Encontre de la Royne Anne Boullant d'Angleterre. Lyon.
- Du Bellay, Joachim; Slavitt, David R. (2004). The Regrets: A Bilingual Edition. Translated from the French and Latin by David R. Slavitt. Evanston: Northwestern University Press. ISBN 0-8101-1993-5.
- Grudé, François, Sieur de La Croix du Main (1773). Rigoley de Juvigny, Jean-Antoine (ed.). Les Bibliothèques Françoises de La Croix-du-Maine et de Du Verdier. Vol. 4. Paris: Saillant & Nyon; Michel Lambert. p. 570.
- Guy, John (1 November 2009). "The Lady in the Tower: The Fall of Anne Boleyn by Alison Weir". The Sunday Times. London.(subscription required)
- Harmer, L.-C. (1939). "Lancelot de Carle; Sa Vie". Humanisme et Renaissance. 6 (4). Librairie Droz: 443–474. in JSTOR
- Ives, Eric (October 2011). "Anne Boleyn on Trial Again". The Journal of Ecclesiastical History. 62 (4). Cambridge University Press: 763–777. doi:10.1017/S002204691100087X. ISSN 0022-0469. at Cambridge Journals Online
- "Letters and Papers, Foreign and Domestic, Henry VIII". British-history.ac.uk.
- Michaud, Joseph Fr.; Michaud, Louis-Gabriel (1813). Biographie Universelle Ancienne et Moderne, ou Histoire par Ordre Alphabétique de la Vie Publique et Privée de Tous les Hommes qui se sont Distingués par Leur Écrits, Leurs Actions, Leurs Talents, Leurs Vertus et Leurs Crimes. Vol. 7. Paris: Michaud Frères. p. 141.
- Norton, Elizabeth (2011). Anne Boleyn: In Her Own Words & the Words of Those Who Knew Her (hardback). Chalford: Amberley. ISBN 9781445600437.
- Rabanis, François-Joseph; Lamothe, Léonce de (1851). Compte-Rendu des Travaux de la Commission des Monuments et Documents Historiques et des Batiments Civil du Département de la Gironde, Pendant l'Année 1850–51: Rapport Présenté au Préfet de la Gironde. Paris: Librairie Archéologique de Victor Didron.
- Richard, Charles Louis; Giraud, Jean Joseph (1761). Dictionnaire Universel, Dogmatique, Canonique, Historique, Geographique et Chronologique, des Sciences Ecclésiastiques. Vol. 4. Paris: Jacques Rollin; Charles-Antoine Jombert; Jean-Baptiste-Claude Bauche. p. 778.
- Russell, Gareth (10 March 2011). "Fatal Delusions: A review of the new biography of Anne Boleyn". Confessions of a Ci-Devant. Garethrussellcidevant.blogspot.com.au.
- Schmid, Susan Walters (2013) [First published University of Arizona 2009]. "Chapter 3: The Poem: Poem Translation". Anne Boleyn, Lancelot de Carle, and the Uses of Documentary Evidence (Ph.D. thesis). Ann Arbor. pp. 110–175.
- Schmid, Susan Walters (March 2011). "Anne Boleyn and Henry VIII". History Review. 69: 7–11. Archived from the original on 14 August 2014.
- Schmid, Susan Walters (2012). "Carle, Lancelot de (c.1508–1568)". In Wagner, John A.; Schmid, Susan Walters (eds.). Encyclopedia of Tudor England (hardback). Vol. 1. Santa Barbara: ABC-CLIO. pp. 218–219. ISBN 9781598842982.
- Schmid, Susan Walters (2012). "Epistre Contenant le Procès Criminel Faict a l'Encontre de la Royne Anne Boullant d'Angleterre". In Wagner, John A.; Schmid, Susan Walters (eds.). Encyclopedia of Tudor England (hardback). Vol. 2. Santa Barbara: ABC-CLIO. pp. 412–414. ISBN 9781598842982.
- Schmidt, Albert-Marie (1953). "Poètes du XVIe siècle". Bibliothèque de la Pléiade. 96. Paris: Gallimard.
- Weir, Alison (2010). The Lady in the Tower: The Fall of Anne Boleyn. London: Vintage. ISBN 9780712640176.
