= Jean de Montereul =

French ecclesiastic and diplomat

Jean de Montreuil [known as Montereul] (c. 1614, Paris – 27 April 1651, Paris) was a French ecclesiastic and diplomat.

== Early life ==
The son of an advocate to the parlement de Paris, Montereul was originally intended for a legal career himself, but in the course of a trip to Italy with Pomponne de Bellièvre (a nephew of pope Urban VIII) he was made a canon of Toul. Paul Pellisson wrote that he was "very proper in negotiation, with a flexible and agile mind, very concerted, and who would hardly ever do anything without a purpose. It was he who gave the opinion that the Elector Palatine would have to pass into France incognito, to go to command the Duke of Weimar's troops, and seize de Brissac; this was why he was pursued there, and why the Elector was stopped on his journey."

== Career ==
In November 1637 when Bellièvre was appointed ambassador to the Court of St James, Montereul joined him at Charles I's court accepting the post of secretary to the ambassador. He stayed in London as chargé d'affaires as when Bellièvre left in late January 1640, returning to France himself in early summer 1641 when the Marquis de La Ferté-Imbault was appointed ambassador.

For just over two years from February 1642 until the spring of 1644 Montereul was secretary to the Marquis de Fontenay-Mareuil, the French ambassador in Rome.

When it looked likely that the Royalists (Cavaliers) would lose the English Civil War, the Scots who were then allied with the English Parliamentarians (Roundheads), looked to Cardinal Mazarin, by then the chief minister of France, for help in securing Charles I's position as king, but on terms acceptable to the Scots. In response Mazarin appointed Montereul as French resident in Scotland.

Montereul arrived in London in August 1645. Once there he opened a dialogue with English Presbyterians such as the Earl of Holland who were sympathetic to the Scots, who too were Presbyterians and formally allied with the Roundheads through the Solemn League and Covenant, but who was disliked by non-Presbyterian Roundheads such as Oliver Cromwell and other religious Independents. There were Scottish commissioners in London who were looking after Scottish interests in the alliance, and during talks with them and English Presbyterians, the idea arose that if Charles I was to place himself under the protection of the Scottish army, then the Presbyterian party could advance their interests.

In January 1646, in furtherance of this plan Montereul journeyed to the Royals headquarters in Oxford where he met Charles I. However Charles was at first unwilling to accept Montereul's proposals as he was unhappy with the proposed abolition of the episcopacy in both kingdoms. Montereul returned to London empty handed. Back in London there was nearly a diplomatic incident when Montereul on discovering that the Earl of Northumberland had obtained French as yet unopened diplomatic correspondence, retrieved them, causing Percy to considered detaining the Montereul by force, but in the end the Earl backed down.

In March Montereul returned to Oxford, and without the agreement of Scots, but in the name of the French king, promised Charles that he would be received by the Scots as their rightful sovereign. Having made that promise Montereul journeyed north and the Scottish Army encampment on outskirts of Newark-on-Trent. He lodged at King's Arms Inn in Southwell (now the Saracen's Head). After further correspondence and with very few options open to him, Charles I journeyed to the Scottish camp and placed himself under the protection of the Scottish commander David Leslie, Lord Newark.

It quickly became apparent to Montereul that what the Scots would do and what Charles I was willing to give were not as close as Montereul had led both parties to expect. In June Montereul returned to France with Charles holding out false hopes of French diplomatic aid. Cardinal Mazarin decide not follow Montereul's advice and decided to send Bellièvre to England as an ambassador. Montereul returned to Newark, but on the way his diplomatic dispatches were seized and read by Parliamentary officers. When their contents became public Charles's credibility suffered, because what they contained showed that his private commitments differed from those he was publicly putting forwards.

When Charles was transferred to English custody and lodged in Holmby House, Montereul left him and travelled to Edinburgh. Here he maintained good relations with both the Engagers and the party that would become known as the Whigamores. Since Montereul's first arrival in England a key concern of Mazarin had been the importance of raising troops for French service. Rendering assistance to Charles was for the cardinal a secondary concern, doubly so once it became likely that the English Parliament would emerge victorious. The numbers of soldiers that Montereul was able to raise remained very low, so from Mazarin's perspective Montereul efforts England was not fruitful.

On his return to France in July 1647, Montreuil resumed his role as secretary to the prince of Conti, and went to Rome again in 1648 then, on his return to Paris, elected to the Académie Française in 1649. Remaining faithful to the prince of Conti and to the duke of Longueville, he entered into a secret correspondence with them during their imprisonment in 1650, but died of tuberculosis aged 36 or 37, shortly after they were freed.

== Works ==
Besides a few pieces of verse and prose which were not published, he left an abundant correspondence, published in Edinburgh at the end of the 19th century.

- The Diplomatic correspondence of Jean de Montereul and the brothers de Bellièvre, French ambassadors in England and Scotland (1645–48), edited, with an English translation, introduction and notes, by J. G. Fotheringham, 2 volumes, Édimbourg, 1898–1899

== Notes ==
Diplomatic posts
Preceded by Pompone de Bellièvre	Ambassador of France to England; 1640–1641	Succeeded by Jacques d'Étampes
Preceded by Jacques d'Étampes	Ambassador of France to England; 1643–1650	Succeeded by Antoine de Bordeaux de Neufville
