= Robert Nanteuil =

French portrait artist (1623–1678)

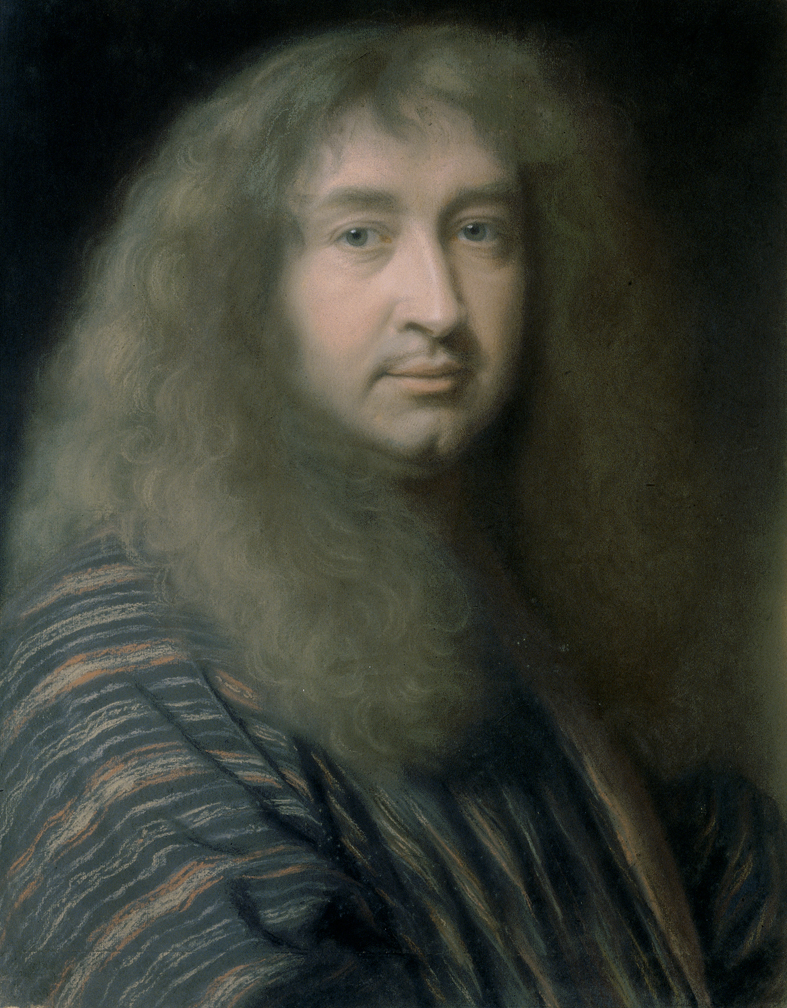
Self-portrait (c. 1665–1669)

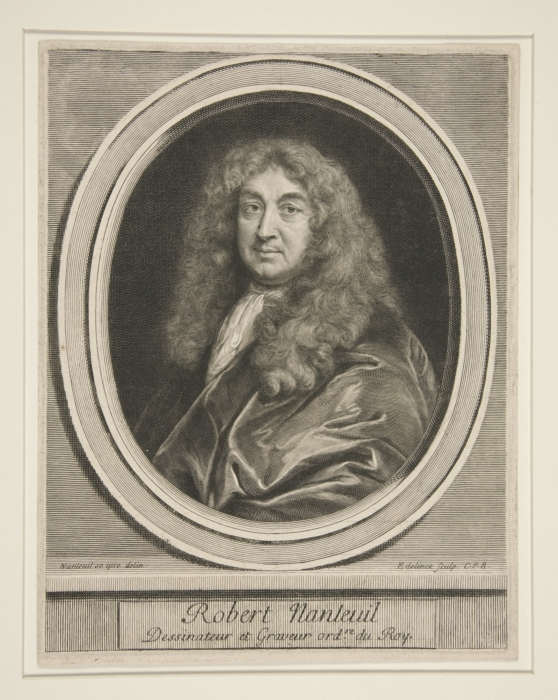
Portrait of Robert Nanteuil, by Gerard Edelinck

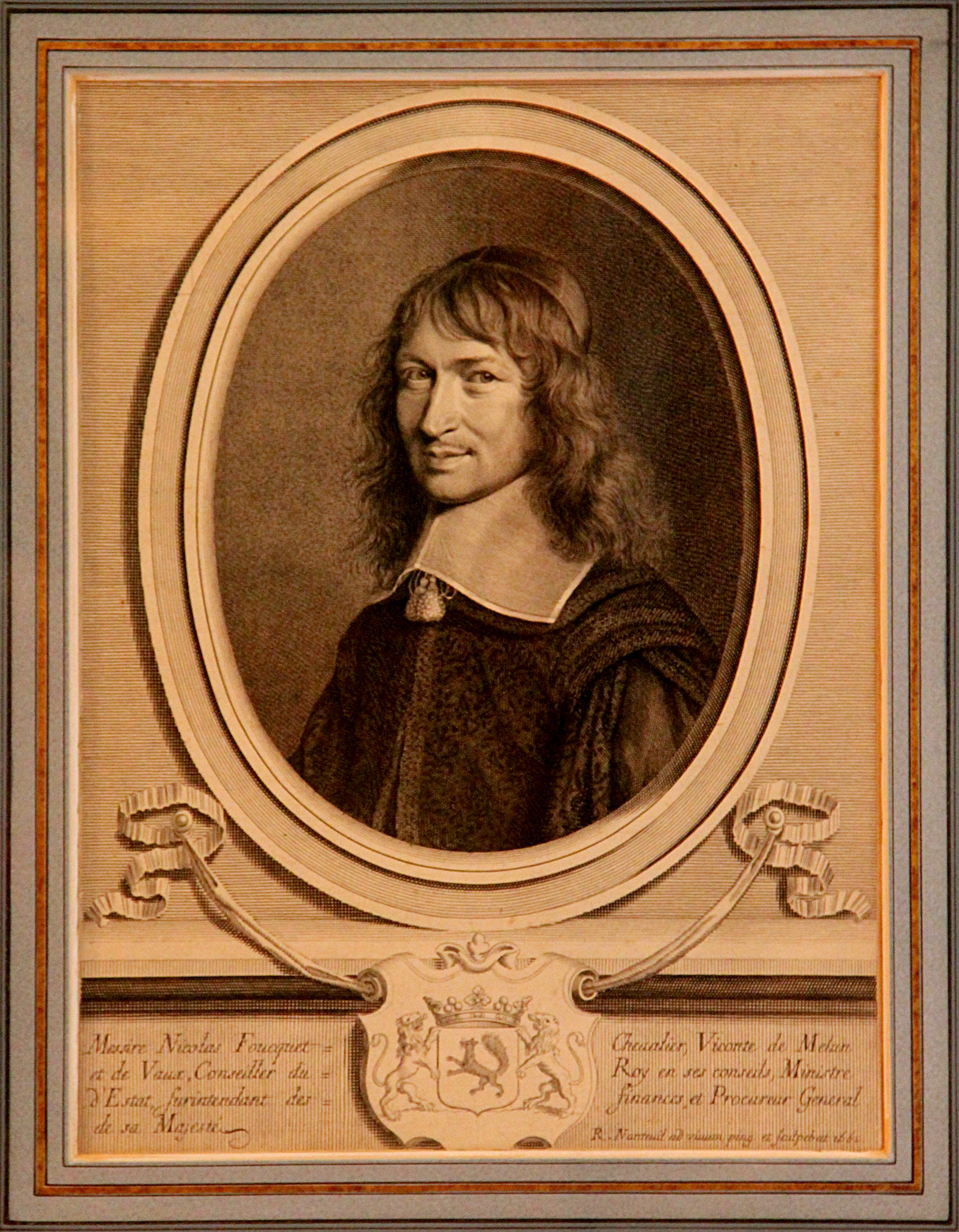
Portrait of Nicolas Fouquet

Robert Nanteuil (French pronunciation: [ʁɔbɛʁ nɑ̃tœj]; 1623 – 9 December 1678) was a French portrait artist: engraver, draughtsman and pastellist to the court of Louis XIV.

== Life ==
He was born in Reims in 1623, the son of Lancelot Nanteuil, a wool merchant of Reims. He studied philosophy in his native Reims but was already an engraver by the time he defended his thesis in 1645. He studied engraving under his brother-in-law, Nicolas Regnesson, whose sister he married in 1646. In 1647 he moved to Paris. His style of drawing was influenced by the painter Philippe de Champaigne, and his engraving, by Claude Mellan and Jean Morin. Around 1650 he became a collaborator and friend of the master engraver Abraham Bosse, who had a strong influence.

His crayon drawings and engraved portraits having attracted attention, by 1652 his work was in high demand. By 1657 he was pensioned by Louis XIV and appointed designer and engraver of the king's cabinet. It was mainly due to his influence that the king granted the edict of 1660, dated from Saint-Jean-de-Luz, by which engraving was pronounced free and distinct from the mechanical arts, and its practitioners were declared entitled to the privileges of other artists. Nanteuil's clientele included the Sun King himself, Cardinal Richelieu, Queen Christina of Sweden and many other high-ranking aristocrats and personages of note. Among the finest works of his fully developed period may be named the portraits of Pompone de Bellièvre, Gilles Ménage, Louis, Grand Condé, Jean Loret, the Duc de La Meilleraye and the Duchesse de Nemours.

He died at Paris on 9 December 1678.

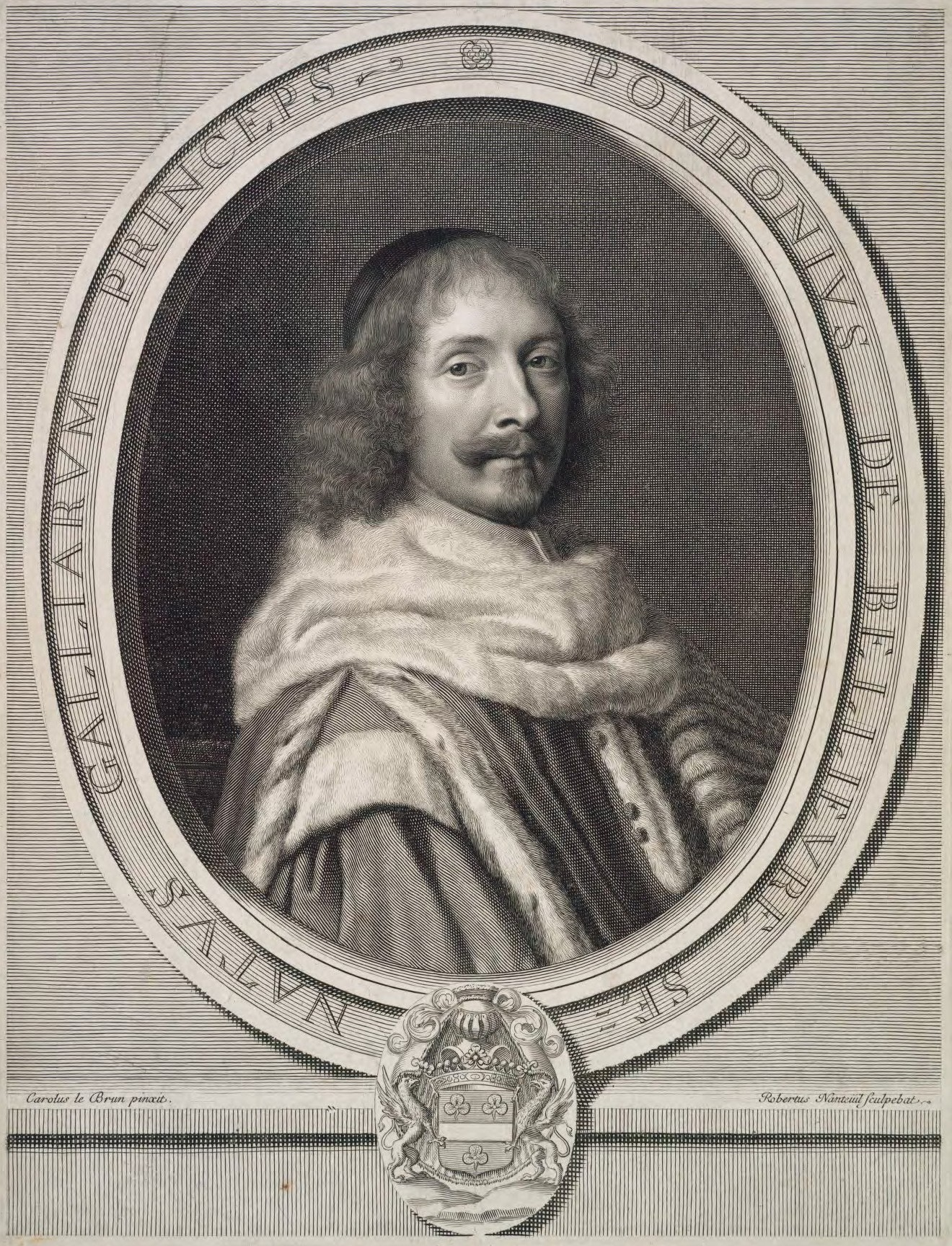
Portrait of Pompone de Bellièvre, after Charles Le Brun

His pupils included Pieter van Schuppen and Domenico Tempesti.

== Work ==
The plates of Nanteuil, several of them approaching the scale of life, number about three hundred. He drew 155 of his 221 portraits from life. In his early practice he imitated the technique of his predecessors, working with straight lines, strengthened, but not crossed, in the shadows, in the style of Claude Mellan, and in other prints cross-hatching like Regnesson, or stippling in the manner of Jean Boulanger; but he gradually asserted his full individuality, modeling the faces of his portraits with the utmost precision and completeness, and employing various methods of touch for the draperies and other parts of his plates.

== Bibliography ==
- Adamczak, Audrey (2011). Robert Nanteuil, ca.1623-1678 [catalogue raisonné of Nanteuil's works: pastels, drawings & prints]. Paris: Arthena Editions. ISBN 9782903239473.
- Benezit (2006). "Nanteuil, Robert", vol. 10, p. 151, in Benezit Dictionary of Artists. Paris: Gründ. ISBN 9782700030709.
- Pinkerton, J. M. (1996). "Nanteuil, Robert", vol. 22, pp. 465–466, in The Dictionary of Art, 34 volumes, edited by Jane Turner. New York: Grove. ISBN 9781884446009.
