= Pieter van Schuppen =

Flemish painter and engraver (1627–1702)

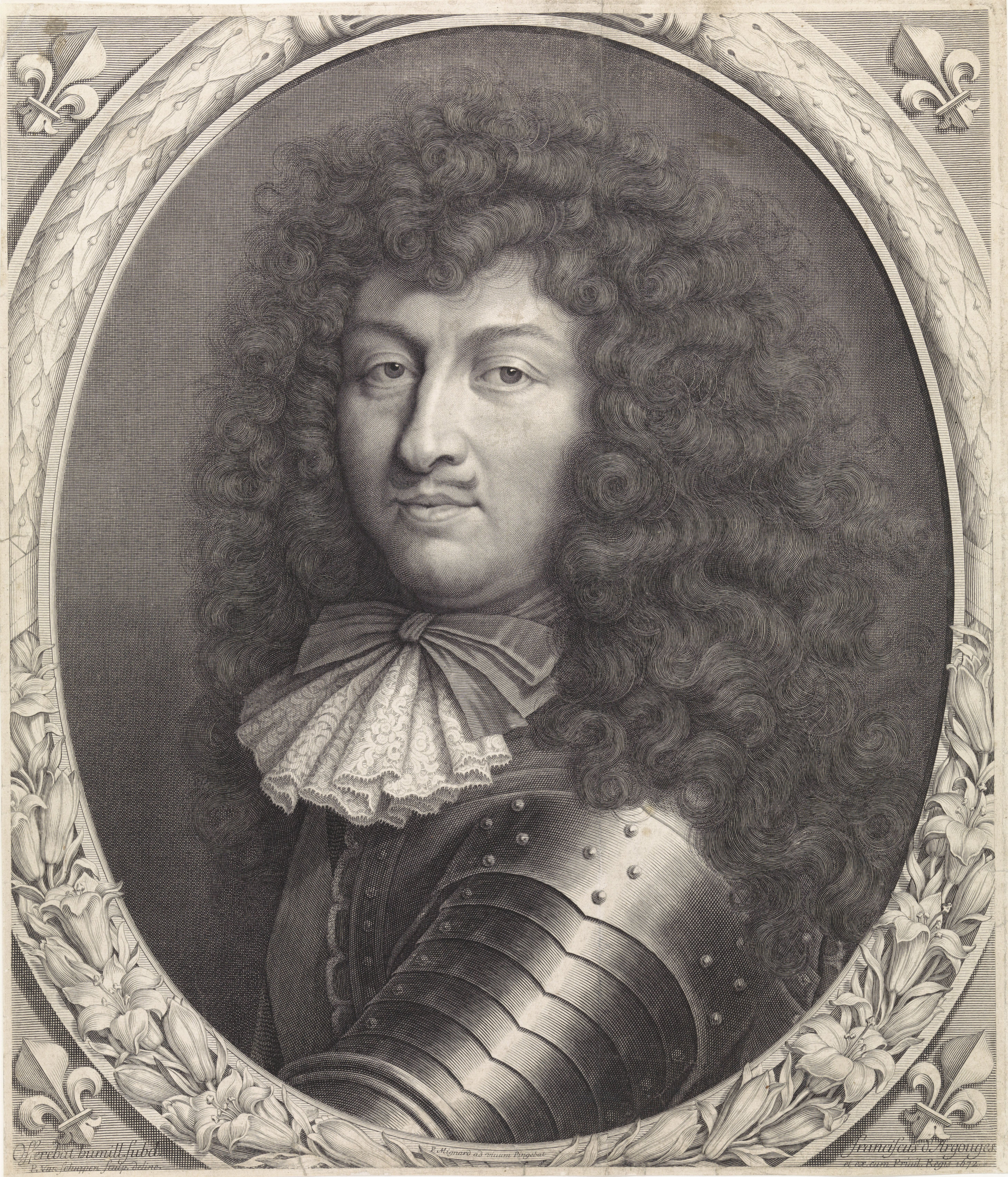
Portrait of Louis XIV

Pieter van Schuppen, known in France also as Pierre Louis van Schuppen (Antwerp, 5 September 1627 – Paris, 7 March 1702) was a Flemish painter and engraver who was mainly active in France, where he enjoyed a reputation for his portrait prints.

== Life ==
Pieter van Schuppen studied painting in Antwerp from 1639 and became master in the local guild of St Luke in 1651. He then left Antwerp and settled in 1655 in Paris, where he became a pupil of Robert Nanteuil, the foremost French engraver of his time.

He was admitted to the Académie royale de peinture et de sculpture in 1663. He married Elisabeth de Mesmaker. The couple had five children. Their son Jacob van Schuppen was taught the principles of art by his father and became a prominent painter in Vienna.

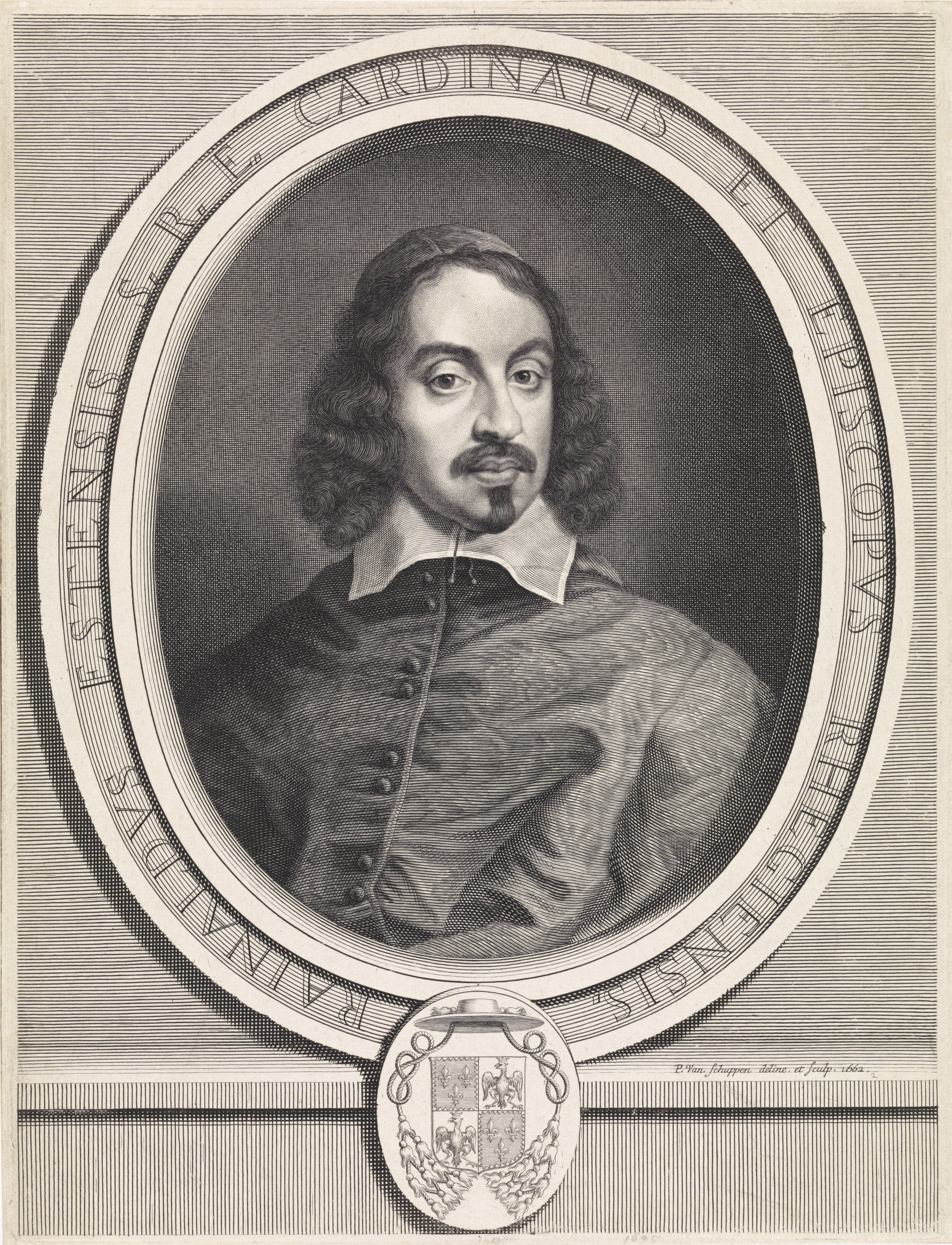
Portrait of Cardinal Rinaldo d'Este

== Work ==
He left about 119 prints, mainly portraits of famous individuals of his day such as Cardinal Rinaldo d' Este, Cardinal Mazarin, and King Louis XIV of France. Some of these were made after his own designs such as the Portrait of Cardinal Rinaldo d' Este. Most of them are after paintings by other artists. He also made reproductive prints of the history paintings of other artists an example of which is the St Sebastian after Anthony van Dyck.

Pieter van Schuppen excelled in the use of ornamental design. He possessed a dexterity with the engraved line and ability to capture the most subtle features of the face. Because of these abilities he was during his life known as 'le petit Nanteuil' (the little Nanteuil).
