= George W. Bernard =

British historian

George William Bernard is a British historian who specializes in the reign of King Henry VIII of England, specifically the English Reformation of the 1530s – both in England and globally – and the "reign" of Anne Boleyn. He is most famous for his arguments for the strength of Henry VIII as a ruler not controlled by faction, and for his theory that Anne Boleyn was guilty of adultery in 1536, based on a poem by Lancelot de Carles. He is commonly juxtaposed with David Starkey and Eric Ives, who have forcefully presented opposing arguments. Bernard's willingness to defend unpopular positions has been noted both by his admirers and his critics.

== Education and career ==
Bernard was born in London and educated at Reading School, before moving to Oxford to take degrees at St. Catherine's College. He was awarded his DPhil in 1978 with a thesis entitled "The Fourth and Fifth Earls of Shrewsbury: A Study in the Power of Early Tudor Nobility", which he later revised into monograph form. He taught History for seven years at Wolverhampton Polytechnic, between the ages of 24 and 31. In 1981, he took up a position at the University of Southampton, where he now works alongside a former student, Mark Stoyle. Between 2001 and 2011, he served as editor of the leading historical journal English Historical Review. He also served on the Council of the Royal Historical Society for fifteen years, acting as Vice-President from 2008 to 2011.

== Publications ==
=== Books ===
- Who Ruled Tudor England? Paradoxes of Power (2021)
- The Late Medieval English Church: Vitality and Vulnerability before the Break with Rome (2012)
- Anne Boleyn: Fatal Attractions (2010)
- The King's Reformation: Henry VIII and the Remaking of the English Church (2005)
- Religion, Politics and Society in Sixteenth-Century England (2004)
- Studying at University: How to Adapt Successfully to College Life (2003)
- Edward VI (with J. Loach and P. Williams, 1999)
- War, Taxation and Rebellion in Early Tudor England: Henry VIII, Wolsey and the Amicable Grant of 1525 (1986)
- The Power of the Early Tudor Nobility : A Study of the Fourth and Fifth Earls of Shrewsbury (1985)

=== Edited collections ===
- Authority and Consent in Tudor England: Essays Presented to C. S. L. Davies (with Steven Gunn, 2002)
- The Tudor Nobility (1992)

=== Book sections ===
- Reflecting on the King's Reformation (2013)
- Religion, Politics, and Society in Sixteenth-Century England (2003)
- The Tyranny of Henry VIII (2002)
- Vitality and Vulnerability in the Late Medieval Church: pilgrimage on the eve of the break with Rome (1998)

=== Papers ===
Bernard has also published a wide range of papers and reviews, about which more information can be found on his personal web page. He has also released other books, including 'Power and Politics: Essays by G. W. Bernard' which are collated from collections of his earlier papers. The themes of these include architecture, Henrician politics, Anne Boleyn, Thomas Cromwell and Geoffrey Elton's arguments, and also in-depth studies of the role and significance of nobles in the Early Modern period.
