= Jeanne de Laval (1549–1586) =

French noblewoman

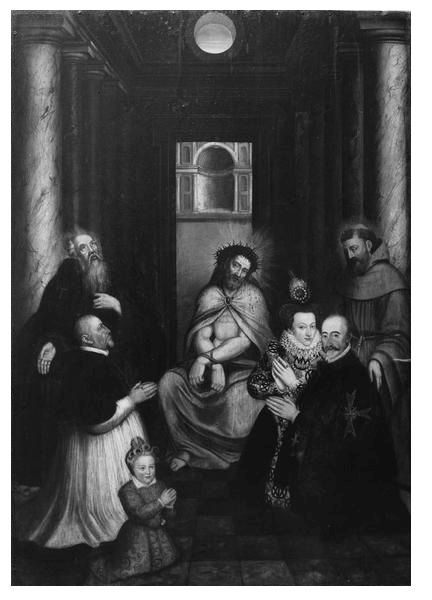
The suffering Christ, Saint Francis and Saint Anthony, surrounded by the donors: Bishop Antoine de Saint-Nectaire, François de Saint-Nectaire, his wife Jeanne de Laval and daughter Hippolyte.

Jeanne de Laval (also Madame de Sennecterre) (1549–1586), was a French noblewoman. She was the mistress of Henry III of France. She was a lady-in-waiting to the queen, Louise of Lorraine.

== Biography ==
She was a daughter of Gilles II de Laval-Loué and Louise de Sainte-Maure de Neslé.

She married on 14 February 1564 François de Saint-Nectaire, State Councilor and Knight of the Order of the Holy Spirit. They had 5 daughters and 1 son :

- Diane, wife of Christophe de Polignac and maid of honor of Queen Louise of Lorraine,
- Louise,
- Marie, married François de Belvezeix,
- Hippolyte, married Jean-Antoine de Blou,
- Magdeleine, maid of honor to Catherine de' Medici, then lady-in-waiting to Anne, Countess of Soissons,
- Henri I de Saint-Nectaire, ambassador in England and Rome, State minister.

She becomes the mistress of King Henry III of France, who appreciated her for her wit. The King had an emotional attachment towards her. When she was on her deathbed, the King came to see her one last time.
