= Antoine de Castelnau =

French diplomat and bishop

Antone de Castelnau
- Bishop of Tarbes
- Church: Catholic Church
- Diocese: Tarbes
- Elected: 1534
- Term ended: 1539
- Predecessor: Gabriel de Gramont
- Successor: Louis de Castelnau
- Other post: Abbot of Divielle

Personal details
- Born: France
- Died: 1539 Toledo, Spain
- Denomination: Roman Catholic
- Parents: Louis de Castelnau, baron of Castelnau, Miremont, Buanes and Bats; Susanne de Gramont

Antoine de Castelnau, (died 1539), Bishop of Tarbes, was a French diplomat, who served as an ambassador to England and Spain during the reign of Francis I.

== Biography ==
Antoine de Castelnau was the son of Louis de Castelnau, baron of Castelnau, Miremont, Buanes and Bats (1460 – before 1529), and Susanne de Gramont (died after 1525).

Castelnau was appointed Bishop of Tarbes in 1534, a position he held until 1539. His brother, Louis de Castelnau, Abbot of Divielle (died 1549), succeeded him as Bishop of Tarbes in 1540.

He succeeded Charles de Solier, comte de Morette, as Francis I's ambassador to the court of Henry VIII of England from 26 June 1535 until 1537. It was there he discovered the secret intrigues of Charles V, who had proposed a marriage between Princess Mary, daughter of Henry VIII, and Dom Luis, his brother-in-law, with the Duchy of Milan as the prize. He was succeeded as ambassador by Louis de Perreau, Sieur de Castillon.

Castelnau was in London during the dramatic fall of Anne Boleyn, the second wife of Henry VIII, and it was under the ambassador's roof that his secretary, Lancelot de Carle, an eye-witness to the queen's trial and execution, wrote a controversial poem detailing her life and all that he had seen and heard.

Castelnau was later appointed ambassador to Spain.

He died in Toledo, Spain, in 1539.
