= Amelius of Tarbes =

Bishop of the diocese of Tarbes

Amelius was a bishop of the diocese of Tarbes in southwestern France in the 6th century, recruited into the clergy from the Gallo-Roman aristocracy.

Amelius is mentioned briefly in the writings of Gregory of Tours. According to Gregory, there was an imposter who was travelling around Francia claiming to have relics of the saints and deceiving people. This imposter created trouble in Paris, and the church authorities in Paris had him imprisoned. When Gregory and other bishops were gathered in Paris, the imposter was brought to them at one point, and Amelius of Tarbes recognized this man as his former slave who had run away. The man was then pardoned and Amelius brought him back to his diocese.

It seems that Amelius may have been one of the bishops who supported King Chilperic I. In 585, he is said to have served as an ambassador between Chilperic and Liuvigild of Spain. He also participated in the third Synod of Mâcon in 585, listed as being from Bioretanis, a Latin form of the name of Bigorre, the region containing the city of Tarbes.
