= Pompone de Bellièvre =

French magistrate, ambassador and statesman

Pompone II de Bellièvre Marquis of Grignon
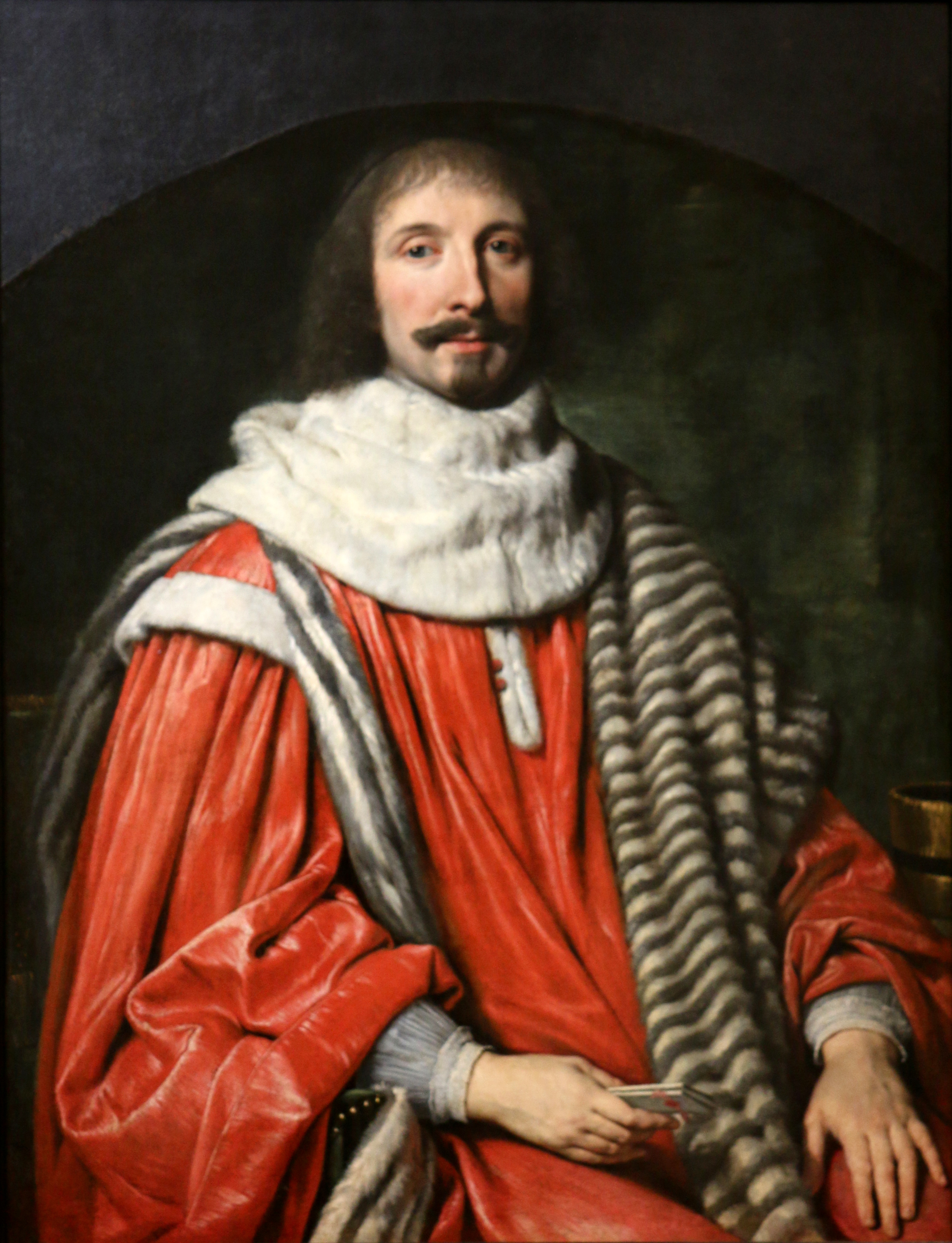
- Portrait of Bellièvre, by Philippe de Champaigne c. 1650

First President of the Parlement of Paris
- In office 1653–1657
- Preceded by: Mathieu Molé
- Succeeded by: Guillaume de Lamoignon

Ambassador of France to England
- In office 1637–1640
- Preceded by: Henri I de Saint-Nectaire
- Succeeded by: Jean de Montereul

Personal details
- Born: 1606
- Died: 13 March 1657 (aged 50–51)
- Spouse: Marie de Bullion
- Relations: Pomponne de Bellièvre (grandfather); Nicolas Brûlart de Sillery (grandfather)
- Parent(s): Nicolas de Bellièvre; Claude Brûlart de Sillery

Pompone II de Bellièvre (1606 – 13 March 1657) was a French magistrate, ambassador and statesman, ending his career as First President of the Parlement of Paris, from 1653 to 1657.

== Early life ==
Bellièvre was the son, nephew, and grandson of eminent men. He was the son of Nicolas de Bellièvre (1583–1650) and Claude Brûlart de Sillery, who married in 1605. His father was Procureur général and also Président à mortier of the Parlement and one of the thirty Conseillers d'État of France. Both of his grandfathers, Pomponne de Bellièvre and Nicolas Brûlart de Sillery, served as Chancellor of France.

== Career ==
Bellièvre himself became the head of the magistracy of France, ambassador to England, and in his last years the first President of the Parlement of Paris. While Bellièvre was in England, Cardinal Mazarin gave him the hopeless task of making peace between King Charles I and the Long Parliament.

His brother, Pierre de Bellièvre, seigneur of Grignon, abbé of Saint-Vincent de Metz, was French ambassador to Scotland during his own mission to England. He received the title, Marquis de Grignon, in 1651.

Bellièvre became one of the main benefactors of the Hôpital général de Paris, founded in 1656. This was nearer to being a gigantic almshouse than to the modern concept of a hospital and set out to house forty thousand Parisians, about a tenth of the city's population, the men at Bicêtre, and the women at La Salpêtrière. All of the poor were to be gathered together on clean premises, to be cared for, educated and given an occupation. The new institution benefited from large donations from Fouquet, Mazarin and Bellièvre, but it did not turn out as hoped.

== Personal life ==
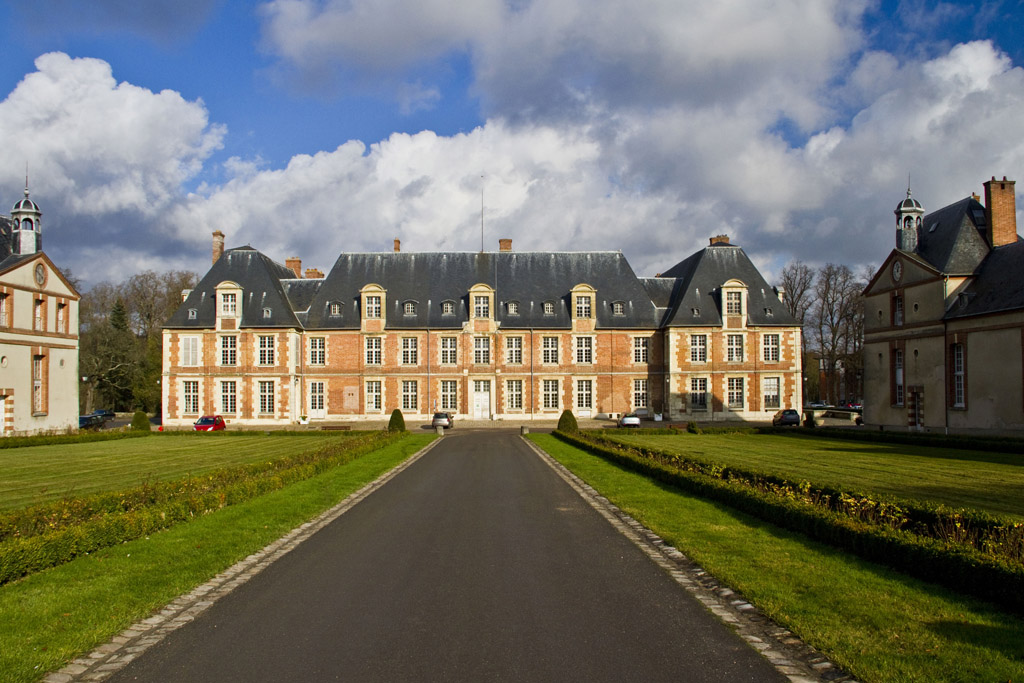
Château de Grignon

Bellièvre married Marie de Bullion, Lady of La Grange-au-Bois, daughter of Claude de Bullion and Angélique Faure (the niece of his grandfather, Nicolas Brûlart de Sillery). They had no surviving children. From his father, he inherited the Château de Grignon in Thiverval-Grignon, in the Yvelines department in the Île-de-France region in north-central France, which his paternal grandfather had bought from Diane de Poitiers in the 16th century. He also owned the Château de Berny.

The biographer Louis Gabriel Michaud says of Bellièvre:

This illustrious family was extinguished in the person of Pompone de Bellièvre, son of Nicolas and first President of the Parlement of Paris, who died in 1657 without posterity after having deployed great talents on diplomatic missions in Italy, England, and Holland. This worthy magistrate, enriched by his wife, who was the daughter of the Superintendent Bullion, lived in great magnificence, which did not prevent him from founding the General Hospital of Paris. Before this, the poor had lived and died deprived of all help, spiritual or temporal. They found both in this new refuge.

The Bellièvre fortune was extinguished in 1675, when his last brother and heir, Pierre de Bellièvre, had to abandon all of his property to his creditors, including Gaspard III de Fieubet, as he was unable to repay his debts.

=== Character ===
According to the panegyric spoken at Bellièvre's funeral, and later printed, he possessed "pure glory and innocent riches" and was incorruptible, not to be bought at any price. He showed "...charity for the wretched, a vehemence just and inflexible to the dishonest and wicked, with a sweetness noble and beneficent for all". He also had a pleasant and gracious address, with intellectual and charming conversation and an agreeable and intelligent silence.

=== Likeness ===
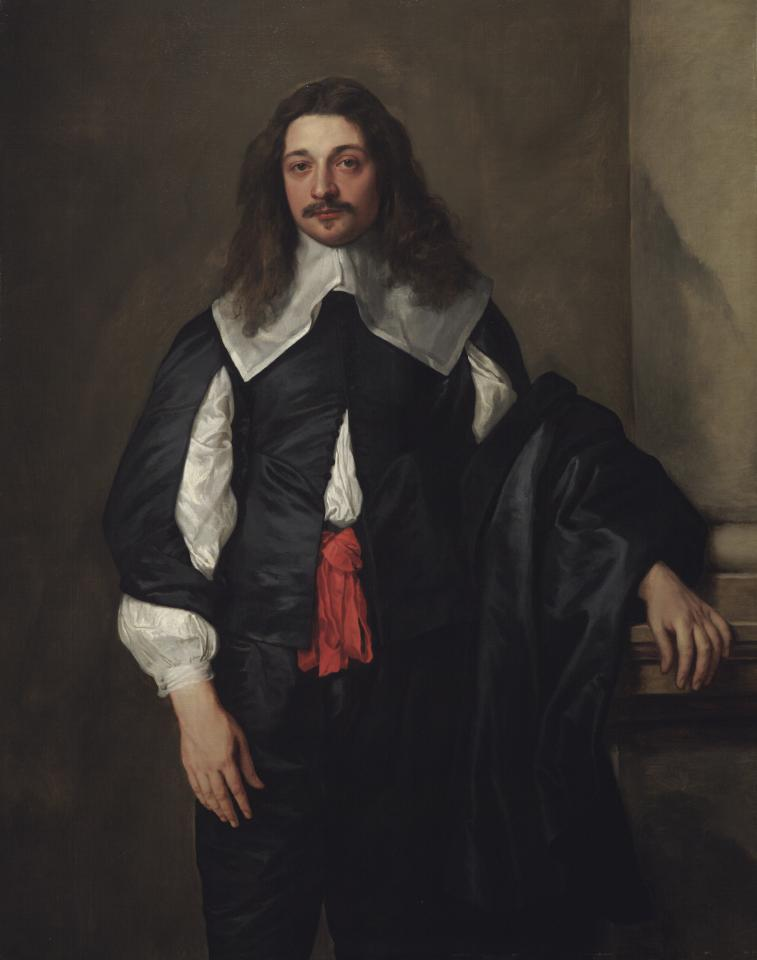
Portrait of Pomponne II de Bellièvre, by Anthony van Dyck, between 1638 and 1639

A lifelike portrait of a 34-year-old Bellièvre by Anthony van Dyck, is in the collection of the Seattle Art Museum. Throughout much of its history, this work was believed to be by Bartholomeus van der Helst and the sitter remained unidentified, until scholars discovered otherwise. Bellièvre's attire was de rigueur in 17th century France. Bellièvre's portrait (pictured above), painted by Charles Le Brun, was engraved by Robert Nanteuil in 1657 and is surrounded by the Latin inscription "POMPONIVS DE BELLIEVRE, SENATVS GALLIARVM PRINCEPS", with a plate size of 327 x 251 mm. Of Nanteuil's work, this has been called "foremost among his masterpieces, and a chief masterpiece of art, being, in the judgment of more than one connoisseur, the most beautiful engraved portrait that exists." Louis Thies wrote of it in March, 1858:

When I call Nanteuil's Pompone the handsomest engraved portrait, I express a conviction to which I came when I studied all the remarkable engraved portraits at the royal cabinet of engravings at Dresden, and at the large and exquisite collection there of the late King of Saxony, and in which I was confirmed or perhaps, to which I was led, by the director of the two establishments, the late Professor Frenzel... There is an air of refinement, vornehmheit, round the mouth and nose as in no other engraving. Color and life shine through the skin, and the lips appear red.

In his The Best Portraits in Engraving, Charles Sumner says of Nanteuil's Pomponivs De Bellievre:

No doubt there have been as handsome men, whose portraits were engraved, but not so well. I know not if Pompone was what would be called a handsome man, although his air is noble and his countenance bright. But among portraits more boldly, delicately, or elaborately engraved, there are very few to contest the palm of beauty.

== Notes ==
Diplomatic posts
Preceded by Henri I de Saint-Nectaire	Ambassador of France to England; 1637–1640	Succeeded by Jean de Montereul
