= Tarbes Cathedral =

Cathedral in Hautes-Pyrénées, in France

Coordinates: 43°14′2″N 0°4′8″E

Tarbes Cathedral Cathédrale Notre-Dame-de-la-Sède de Tarbes
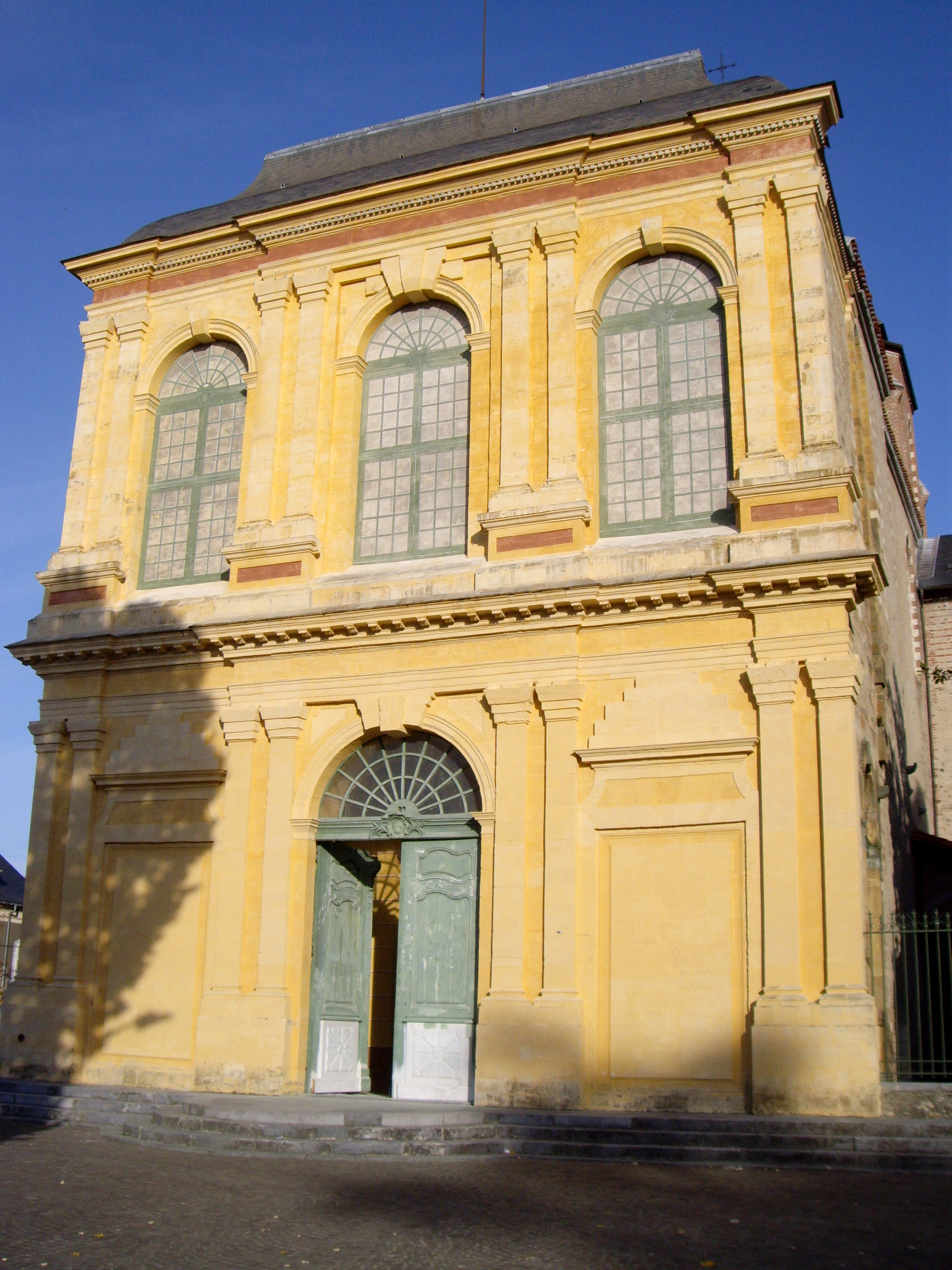
- Tarbes Cathedral

Religion
- Affiliation: Roman Catholic Church
- Province: Bishop of Tarbes-et-Lourdes
- Region: Hautes-Pyrénées
- Rite: Roman
- Ecclesiastical or organisational status: Cathedral
- Status: Active

Location
- Location: Tarbes, France
- Interactive map of Tarbes Cathedral; Cathédrale Notre-Dame-de-la-Sède de Tarbes

Architecture
- Type: church
- Style: Gothic
- Groundbreaking: 12th century

Tarbes Cathedral (French: Cathédrale Notre-Dame-de-la-Sède de Tarbes) is a Roman Catholic church located in the town of Tarbes, Hautes-Pyrénées, France. The cathedral is a national monument and is the seat of the Bishop of Tarbes et Lourdes.

== History ==
Tarbes Cathedral was established during the 12th century. Of the original building there remain two apses of the choir. A first extension was made in the 14th century by the addition of a Gothic nave, which until the 18th century was co-extensive with the outer span. The cathedral resembles a fortress and was built with round pebbles from the river Adour which have also been used for the construction of many houses in Tarbes. It can accommodate up to 600 people.

A large Baroque canopy in marble from the 18th century covers the main altar. Napoleon described Tarbes as "a street without a city, a bridge without a river, an altar without a church", with reference to the immense canopy.

The cathedral also includes a chapel of the Blessed Virgin in which visitors can read the testament of Louis XVI engraved on a black marble wall three meters high. Another feature is the treasure house containing ornaments, chasubles, bishops' crosiers and so forth. Saint Vincent de Paul was ordained as a deacon here in 1598.
