= Portrait of Charles de Solier, Sieur de Morette =

Painting by Hans Holbein the Younger

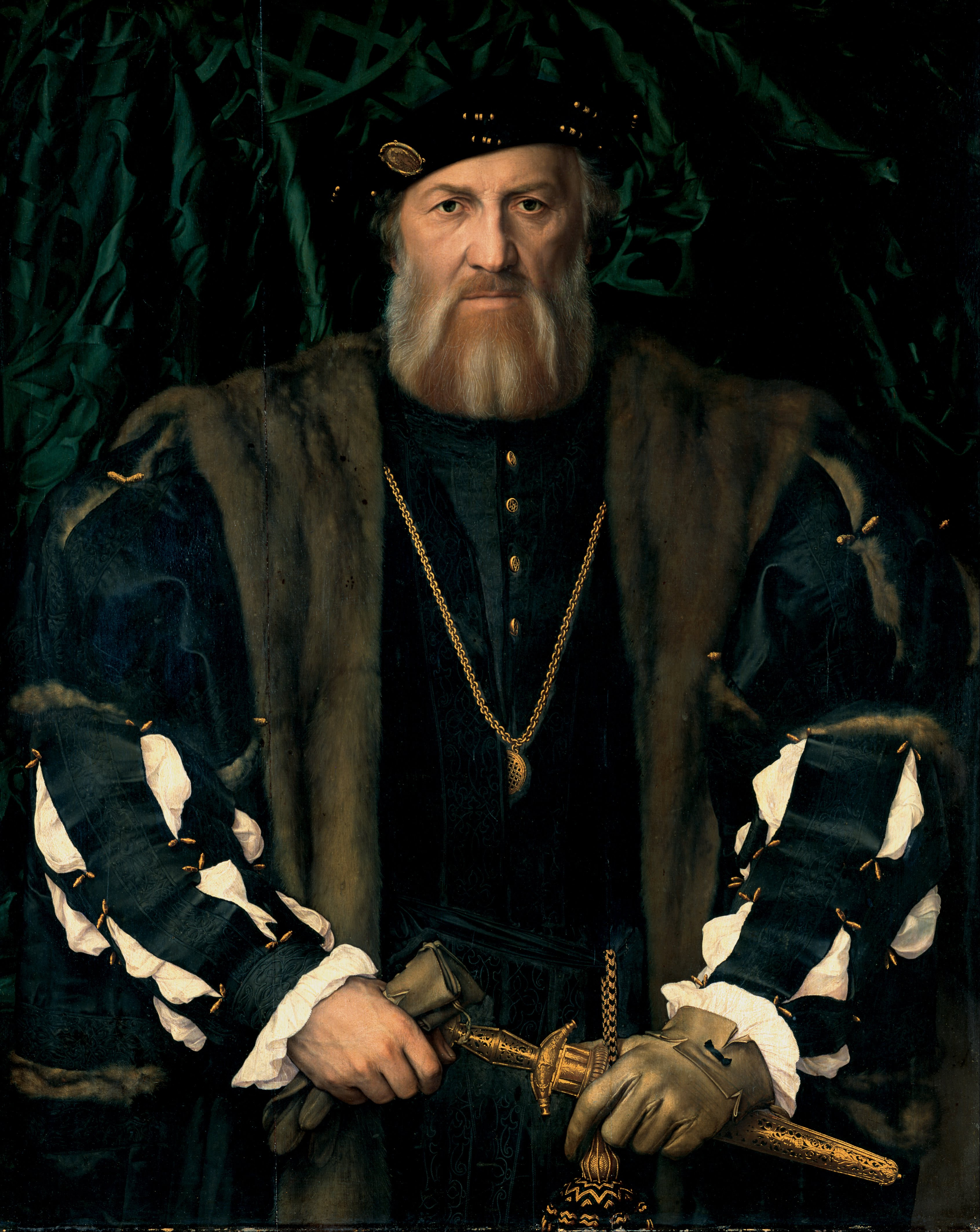
- Artist: Hans Holbein the Younger
- Year: 1534–1535
- Medium: oil and tempera on oak
- Dimensions: 92.5 cm × 75.5 cm (36.4 in × 29.7 in)
- Location: Gemäldegalerie Alte Meister, Dresden, Germany
- Accession: Gal.-Nr. 1890
- Website: gemaeldegalerie.skd.museum/en/

Portrait of Charles de Solier, Sieur de Morette is an oil on oak painting completed in around 1534–1535 by German painter and printmaker, Hans Holbein the Younger, now at the Gemäldegalerie Alte Meister, Dresden. It depicts the French diplomat, Charles de Solier (1480–1552), Francis I's ambassador to England.

Charles de Solier replaced Jean de Dinteville as resident ambassador, arriving in London on 3 April 1534 where he remained until 26 July 1535, during which time his portrait was commissioned.

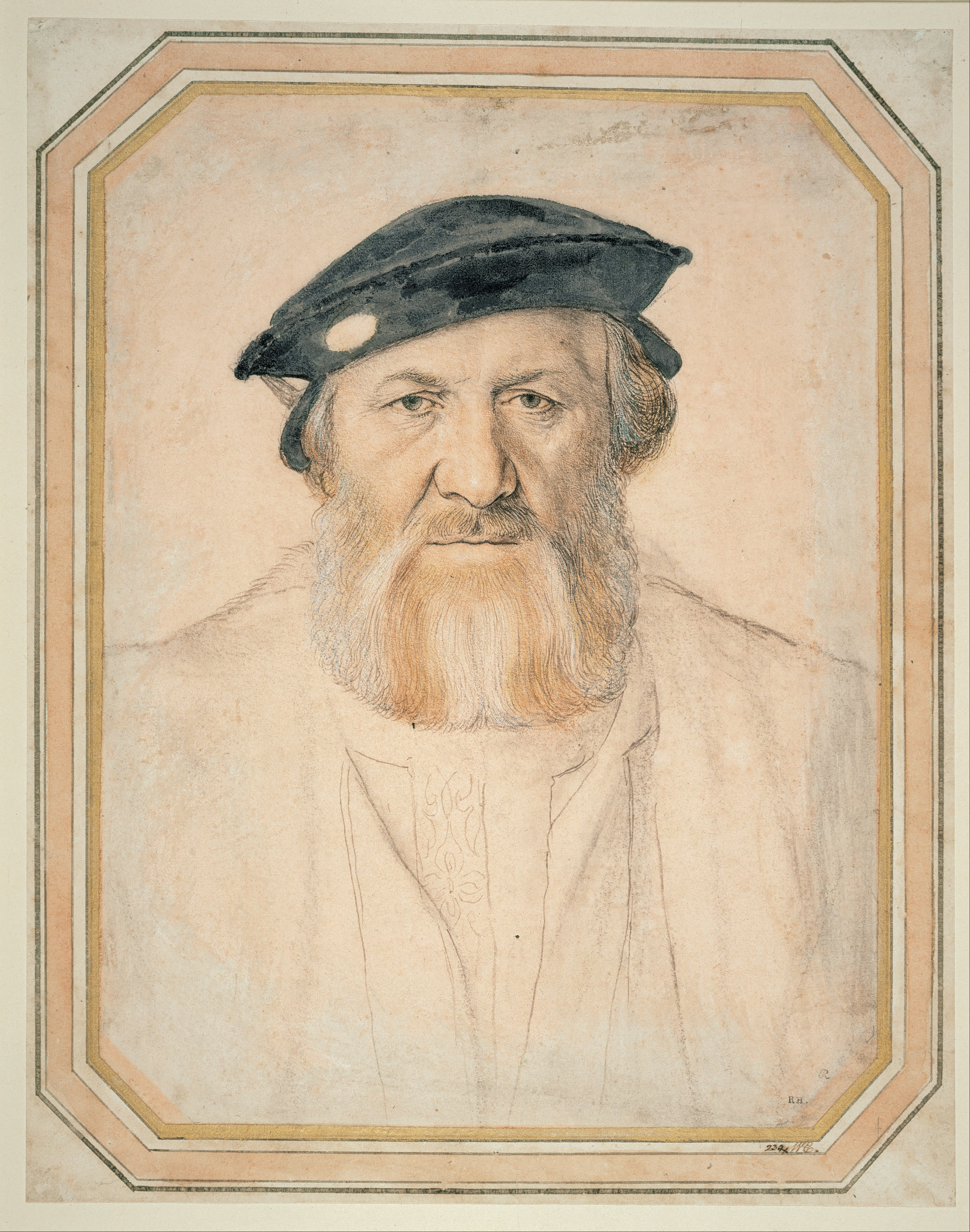
Portrait of Charles de Solier, Sieur de Morette, 1534–1535, Hans Holbein the Younger, Kupferstich-Kabinett, Dresden

== Description ==
Described as "[o]ne of the greatest of all Holbein's individual portraits" by art historian Susan Foister, this painting is extraordinary for the simplicity of its composition. The subject stands before a curtain of sea-green damask, represented life-size and half-length, facing the viewer. He wears a doublet of black satin, the sleeves of which are slashed with white silk; the gold buttons are adorned with an ornamental motif of two M's. His surcoat is of the same black material, with a heavy collar and lining of fur. Both sleeves and black cap are decorated with gold tags, and on the cap he wears a circular gold cap-badge with a figure of John the Baptist with an inscription: DOCE ME FACERE VOLVNTATEM. A design by Holbein for a cap-badge with John the Baptist survives in the British Museum. Around his neck is a gold chain from which hangs a medallion or watchcase of openwork. The attitude, the glove on the left hand and the half-covered medallion on the chain are reminiscent of Titian's L'Homme au Gant in the Louvre. In his right hand he holds a glove, and his left, which is gloved, grasps the gilt and elaborately chased sheath of a dagger, suspended from his girdle by a chain with a large tassel, such as the one worn by Jean de Dinteville in The Ambassadors (1533). His long, reddish beard is streaked with grey.

Franny Moyle observes that the imposing figure of Charles de Solier is "unquestionably regal" and there seems little doubt this portrait is a "prototype for his next cycle of work – his portraits of Henry VIII."

== Identification ==
The preliminary drawing of the head is in the Kupferstich-Kabinett, Dresden; an engraving by Wenceslas Hollar appears to have been made from the drawing and gives in addition to the date, 1647, the name “Mr. Morett”, ex collectiane Arundeliana. The painting came into the possession of Duke Francesco I of Modena, after the Earl of Arundel tried in vain to buy it. In 1657 the Microcosmo della Pittura by Francesco Scanelli still mentioned Holbein's picture though the name of the man portrayed was no longer known. Subsequently, the name of the artist was also forgotten and the painting entered the gallery of August III, King of Poland and Elector of Saxony as "portrait of Ludovico il Moro, Duke of Milan, by Leonardo da Vinci".

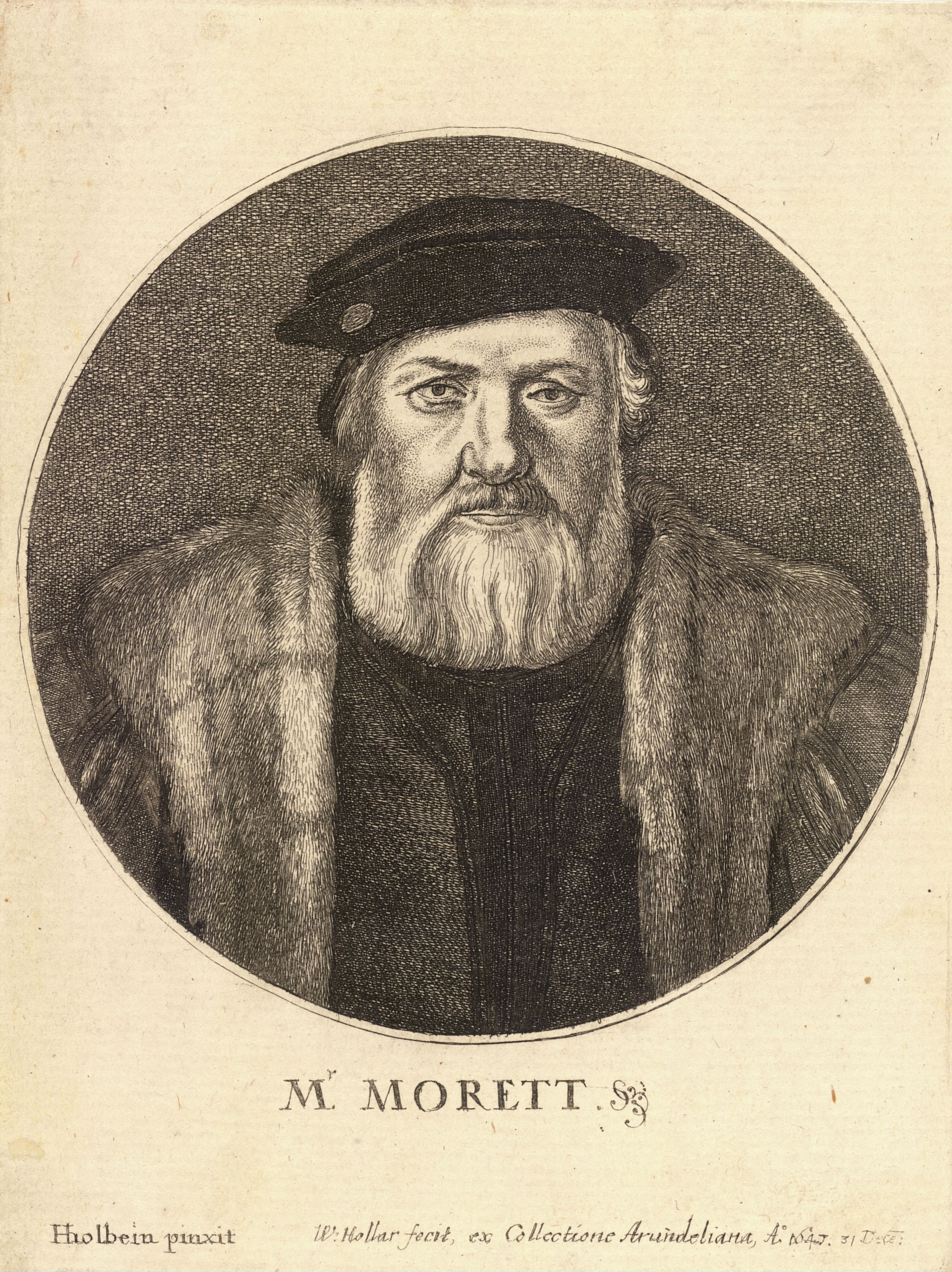
Mr. Morett, 1647, by Wenceslas Hollar

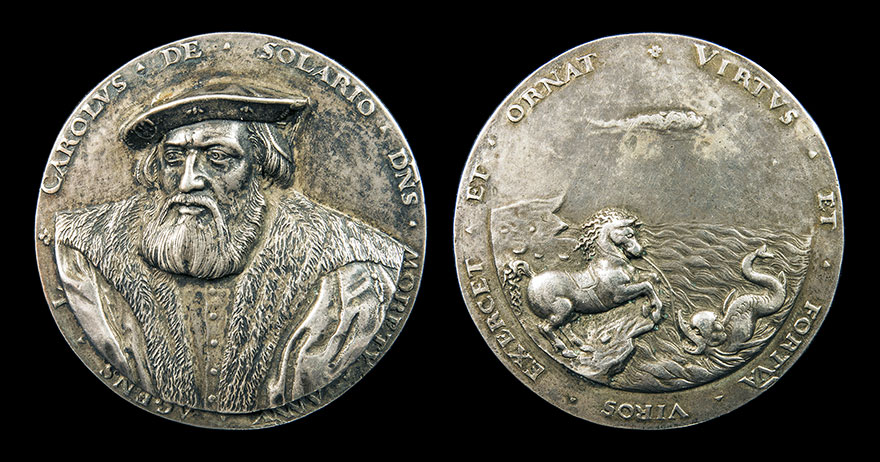
Portrait Medal of Charles de Solier, Comte de Morette, 1530/1 by Christoph Weiditz

In the 19th century Carl Friedrich von Rumohr recognised it as a work by Holbein and Johann Gottlob von Quandt identified the man as the goldsmith Hubert Morett, who had worked at the same time as Holbein at the court of Henry VIII. In 1881, after the Holbein exhibition at Dresden, Norwegian art collector, Sophus Larpent's study, Sur le portrait de Morett dans la galerie de Dresde, proved that the life-size painting represented the French diplomat. Conclusive proof was provided by the discovery, in 1903, of a boxwood model of a contemporary medallion by Christoph Weiditz, now at the Victoria and Albert Museum, which represents Morette full face, aged about 50, with his name and titles in full; on the back his device of a seaport, a horse, and a dolphin.

== Provenance ==
Marchese Massimiliano Montecuccoli, Estense ambassador at Parma and Rome, gave it to Duke Francesco I of Modena (1629–1658); thence by descent, Duke Francesco III of Modena (1737–1780), who sold it, together with other important paintings, in 1746, to August III, King of Poland and Elector of Saxony, as "Portrait of Ludovico Sforza by Leonardo da Vinci".

== See also ==
- List of paintings by Hans Holbein the Younger
