= Épistre Contenant le Procès Criminel Faict à l'Encontre de la Royne Anne Boullant d'Angleterre =

Épistre Contenant le Procès Criminel Faict à l'Encontre de la Royne Anne Boullant d'Angleterre, or A Letter Containing the Criminal Charges Laid Against Queen Anne Boleyn of England, is a 1,318-line poem written in French in 1536, by Lancelot de Carle, secretary to the French ambassador to England, Antoine de Castelnau.

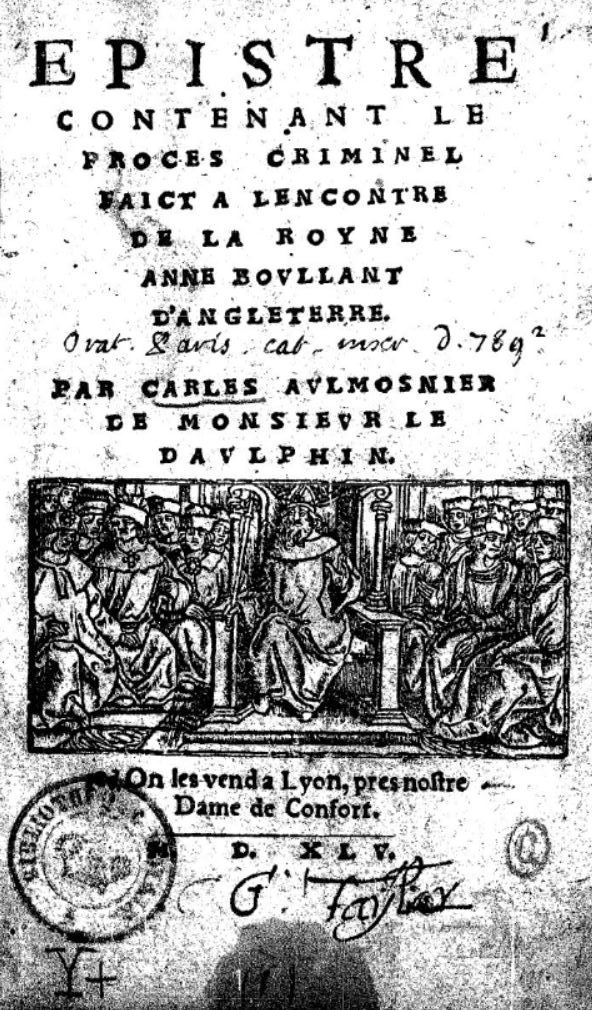

In May 1536, a musician of the royal household, Mark Smeaton, the courtiers Henry Norris, Sir Francis Weston, William Brereton, as well as the queen's brother, George Boleyn, Viscount Rochford, were tried and executed for treason and adultery with Anne Boleyn, the second wife of Henry VIII. Lancelot de Carle was in London at the time, and was an eyewitness to Anne's trial and execution.

The poem, dated 2 June 1536, details the life and the dramatic events surrounding the arrest, trial and execution of Anne Boleyn, and those accused with her. Although not published until 1545, it does appear to have been widely circulated prior to this.
