= Charles de Solier, comte de Morette =

French soldier and diplomat (1480–1552)

Charles de Solier
- Comte de Morette
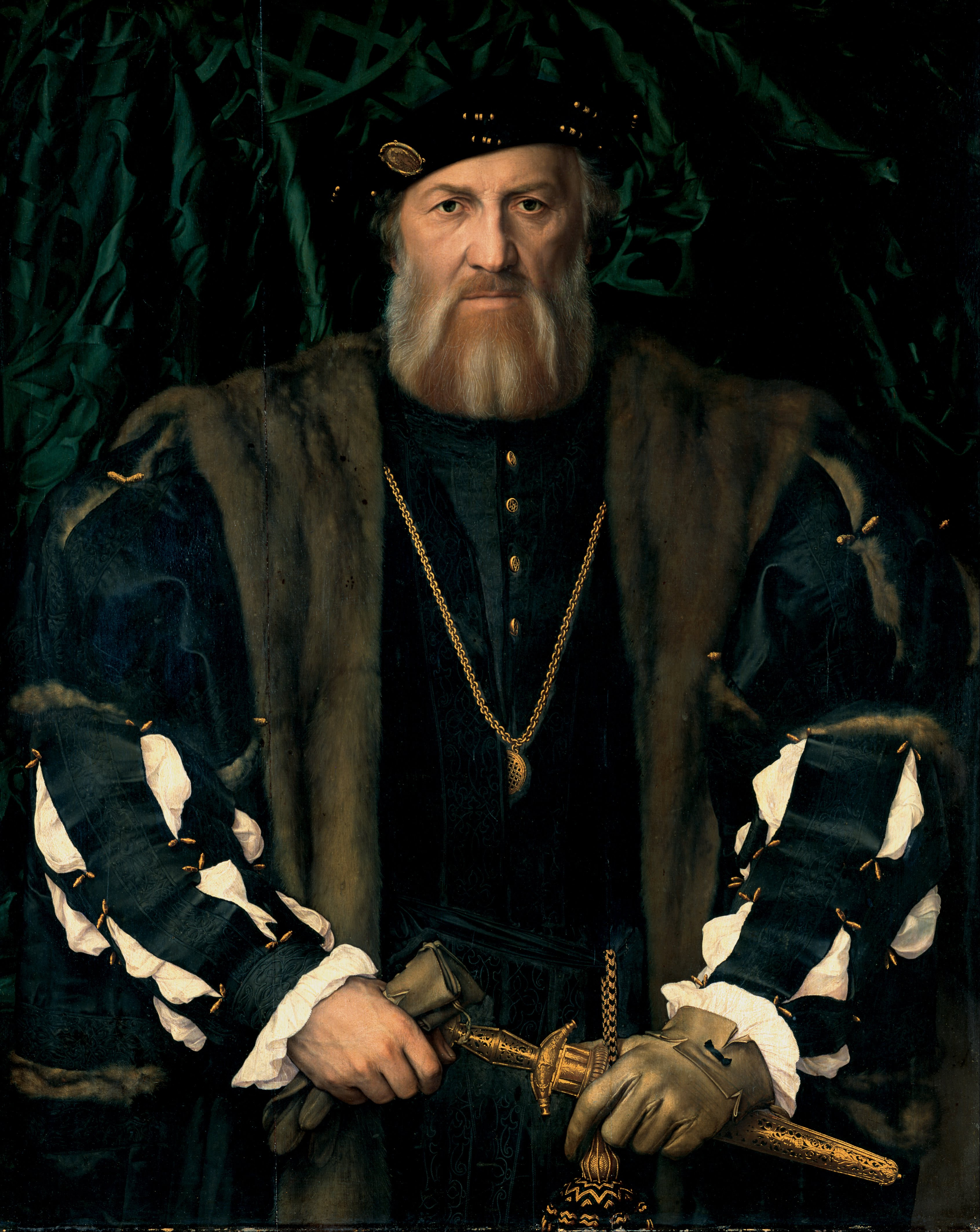
- Charles de Solier, Sieur de Morette, by Hans Holbein the Younger
- Born: 1480; Asti, Piedmont
- Died: 1 February 1552 (aged 71–72); Château de Plessis-lez-Tours
- Buried: Église Saint-Grégoire des Minimes, Tours; 47.3925°N 0.69°E
- Noble family: Solier
- Spouses: Silvie de Pont; Lucie Valles
- Issue: François de Solier, comte de Morette; Charles de Solier; Jacques de Solier; Marie de Solier
- Father: Aubertin de Solier, comte de Morette

Charles de Solier, comte de Morette (1480 – 1 February 1552), the son of Aubertin de Solier, comte de Morette (1465–1545), was a French soldier and diplomat as well as a long-serving gentilhomme de la chambre to Francis I. He acted as ambassador to England on a number of occasions from October 1526 to June 1535. Morette was in London in 1534 when Henry VIII was attempting to win French support for his repudiation of Catherine of Aragon, in an alliance against Holy Roman Emperor Charles V. Around this time, his portrait was painted by Hans Holbein the Younger. He was succeeded as ambassador by Antoine de Castelnau, Bishop of Tarbes.

== Marriages and issue ==
Morette married twice. He married as his first wife, Silvie de Pont (1480–) and the couple had three sons:

- François de Solier, comte de Morette (1495–1541)
- Charles de Solier (c. 1500 – 1525)
- Jacques de Solier (1500–1551)

He married as his second wife, Lucie Valles and by her had a daughter:

- Marie de Solier (1520–)

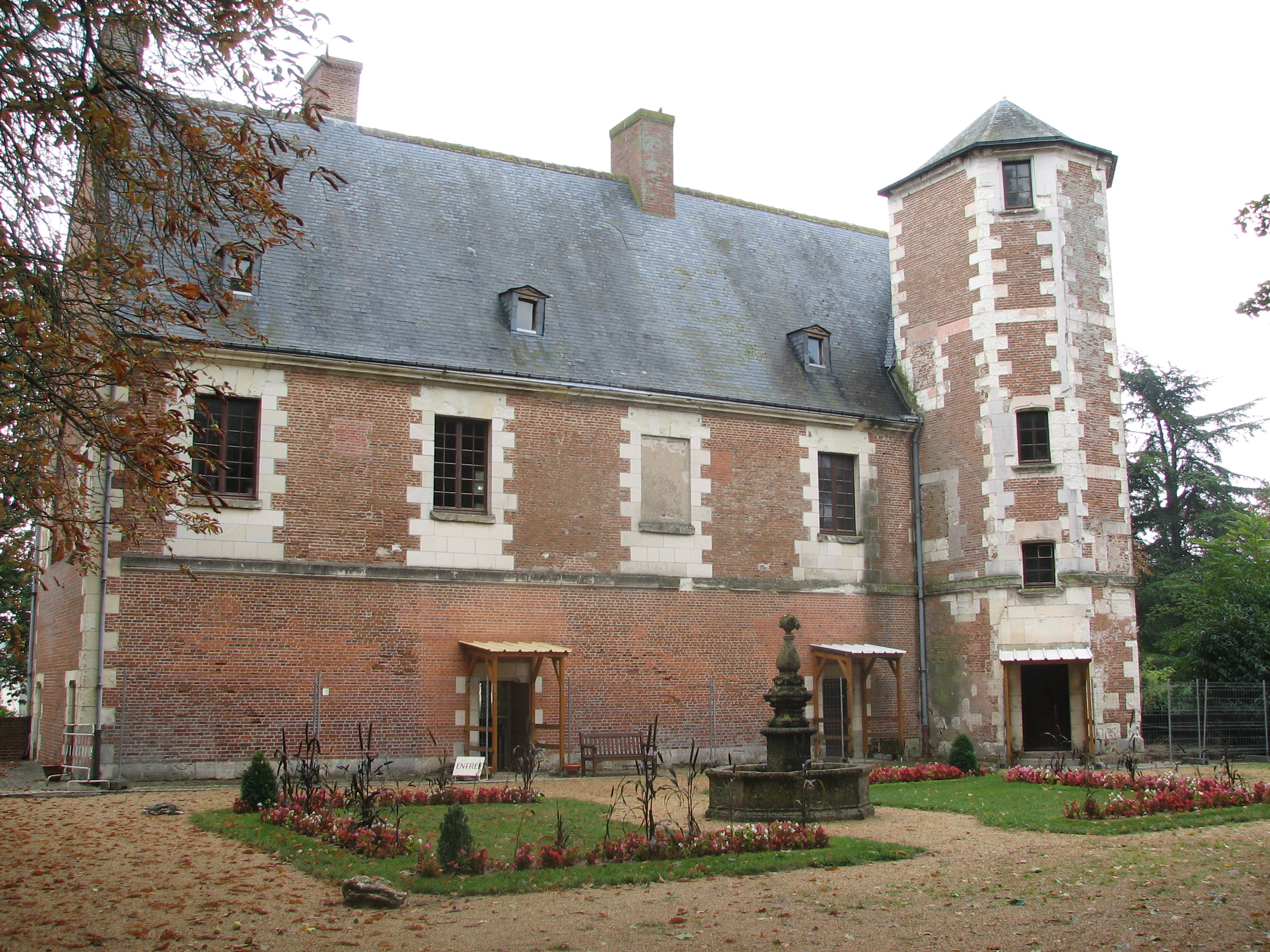
Château de Plessis-lez-Tours

He died 1 February 1552 at Le Plessis les Tours and was buried at the Église Saint-Grégoire des Minimes, Tours.

== Sources ==
- Cust, Lionel Henry (1891). "Holbein, Hans" . In Lee, Sidney (ed.). Dictionary of National Biography. Vol. 27. London: Smith, Elder & Co. pp. 106–110.
- Friedmann, Paul (1884). Anne Boleyn: A Chapter in English History, 1527-1536. Vol. I. London: Macmillan and Co.
- Friedmann, Paul (1884). Anne Boleyn: A Chapter in English History, 1527-1536. Vol. II. London: Macmillan and Co.
- Great Britain. Record Commission (1831). "King Henry the Eighth". State Papers. I. London: John Murray.
- Parker, K. T. (1945). The Drawings of Hans Holbein at Windsor Castle. Oxford: Phaidon.
- Richardson, Glenn (2013). The Field of Cloth of Gold (hardback). New Haven: Yale University Press. ISBN 9780300148862.
- "Spain: June 1535, 16-30". Calendar of State Papers, Spain. British-history.ac.uk. 1886. pp. 492–506, 1534–35.
