= François du Val de Fontenay-Mareuil =

French soldier, diplomat, and historian

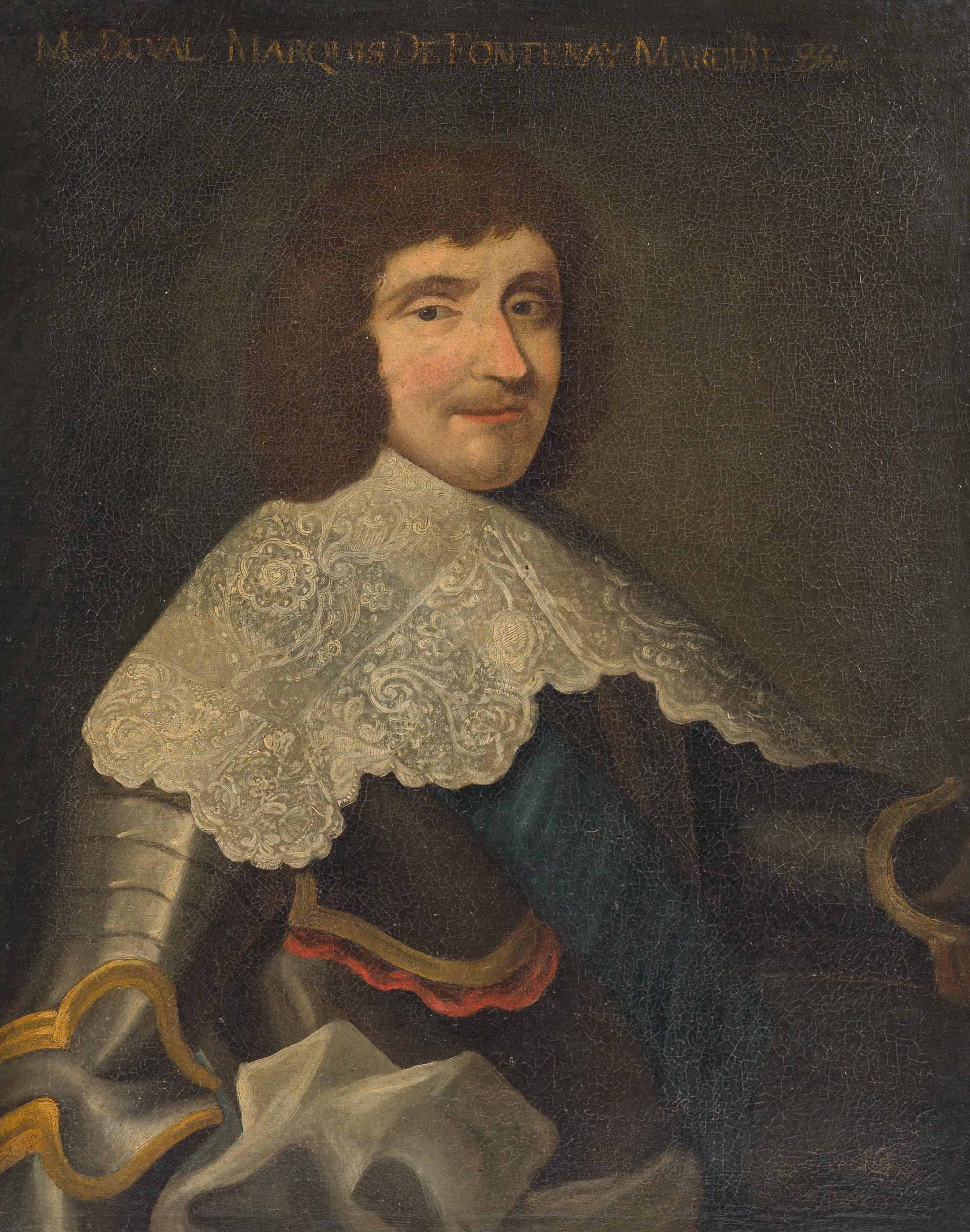
- Portrait de Fontenay-Mareuil (école française du 17e siècle)
- Born: 1594
- Position held: ambassador of France to the Holy See, ambassador of France to England

François du Val, Marquis de Fontenay-Mareuil (fôNt′nā̇′mȧ′rẽ′y’) (c.1594-1665) was a French soldier, diplomat, and historian.

== Biography ==
He was brought up at the Court of Louis XIII.; served with Mayenne in Spain; with Nevers at Ratisbon; under Boisdauphin at the siege of Soissons (1617); in 1619 in Normandy; at Saint-Jean d'Angély, Clérac, and Montauban (1621); at Saint-Antoine and Montpellier (1622); at the Ile de Ré (1627); and at the sieges of La Rochelle (1628), of Privas, and of Alais (1629).

Then his diplomatic career began. He announced the capture of La Rochelle to the Duke of Savoy; escorted Montpensier to the Court; negotiated with Rohan; and from 1630 to 1633 was Ambassador to England. After taking part in various campaigns against the Imperialists and Spaniards, he was Ambassador at Rome from 1640 to 1650.

His memoirs, published at Paris, 1826 (vol. i., of the first series of the Collection Pettitot), are both interesting and valuable.
