= Jean d'Angennes, Marquis de Poygni =

French ambassador

Jean d'Angennes, Marquis de Poigny (1587 – 7 January 1637) was the French ambassador to England in 1634. He died near London.

He was the son of Jean d'Angennes (d.1593), seigneur de Poigny, and Madeleine Thierry. His paternal grandparents were Jacques d'Angennes and Isabeau Cottereau, daughter of Jean, chevalier seigneur de Maintenon. His father Jean d'Angennes was sent as an ambassador to the pope in 1575, and also to Navarre, Savoy and Germany, and was the founder of the house of the Marquis de Poigny.

He married Isabelle de Brouilly, daughter of François, seigneur de Mesvilliers, and Louise de Halluin, and had two children, Charles and Marguerite.
