= Buanes =

- Commune
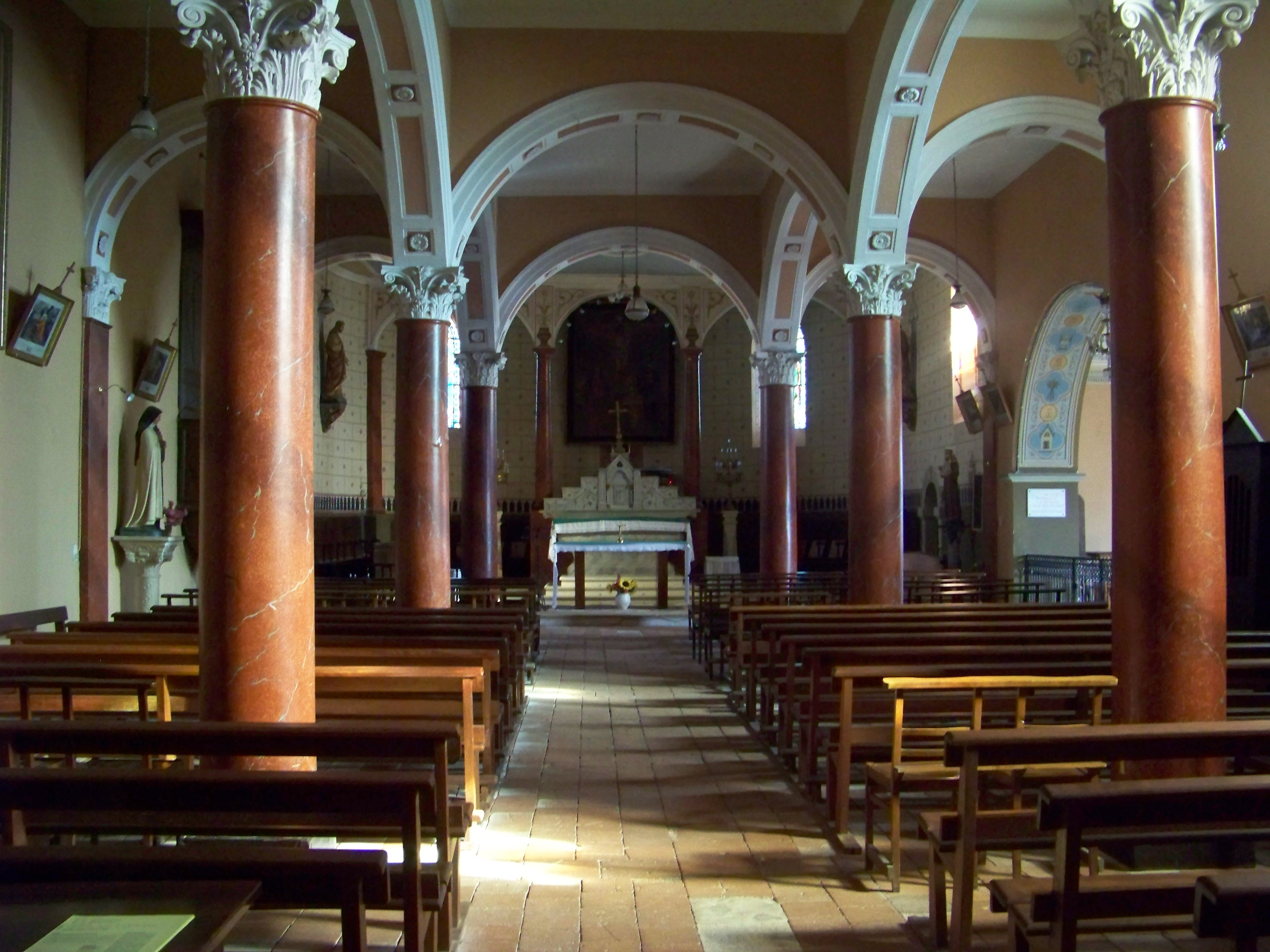
- Inside the church
- Location of Buanes
- Location within France Location within Nouvelle-Aquitaine
- Coordinates: 43°42′42″N 0°25′14″W
- Country: France
- Region: Nouvelle-Aquitaine
- Department: Landes
- Arrondissement: Mont-de-Marsan
- Canton: Adour Armagnac
- Intercommunality: Aire-sur-l'Adour

Government
  - Mayor (2020–2026): Michel Lamothe
- Area^{1}: 6.62 km^{2} (2.56 sq mi)
- Elevation: 135 m (443 ft)
- Highest elevation: 149 m (489 ft)
- Lowest elevation: 69 m (226 ft)
- Population (2023): 236
  - Density: 35.6/km^{2} (92.3/sq mi)
- Time zone: UTC+01:00 (CET)
  - Summer (DST): UTC+02:00 (CEST)
- INSEE/Postal code: 40057 /40320
- ^{1} French Land Register data, which excludes lakes, ponds, glaciers > 1 km^{2} (0.386 sq mi or 247 acres) and river estuaries.

Buanes (French pronunciation: [bɥan]; Gascon: Buanas) is a commune in the Landes department in Nouvelle-Aquitaine in southwestern France.

== Population ==
Historical population
Year	Pop.	±% p.a.
1968	180	—
1975	174	−0.48%
1982	189	+1.19%
1990	173	−1.10%
1999	199	+1.57%
2007	268	+3.79%
2012	276	+0.59%
2017	259	−1.26%
2023	236	−1.54%
Source: INSEE

== See also ==
- Communes of the Landes department
