= Diocese of Tarbes-et-Lourdes =

Catholic diocese in France

Coordinates: 43.2337°N 0.069125°W

Diocese of Tarbes et Lourdes Dioecesis Tarbiensis et Lourdensis Diocèse de Tarbes et Lourdes

Catholic
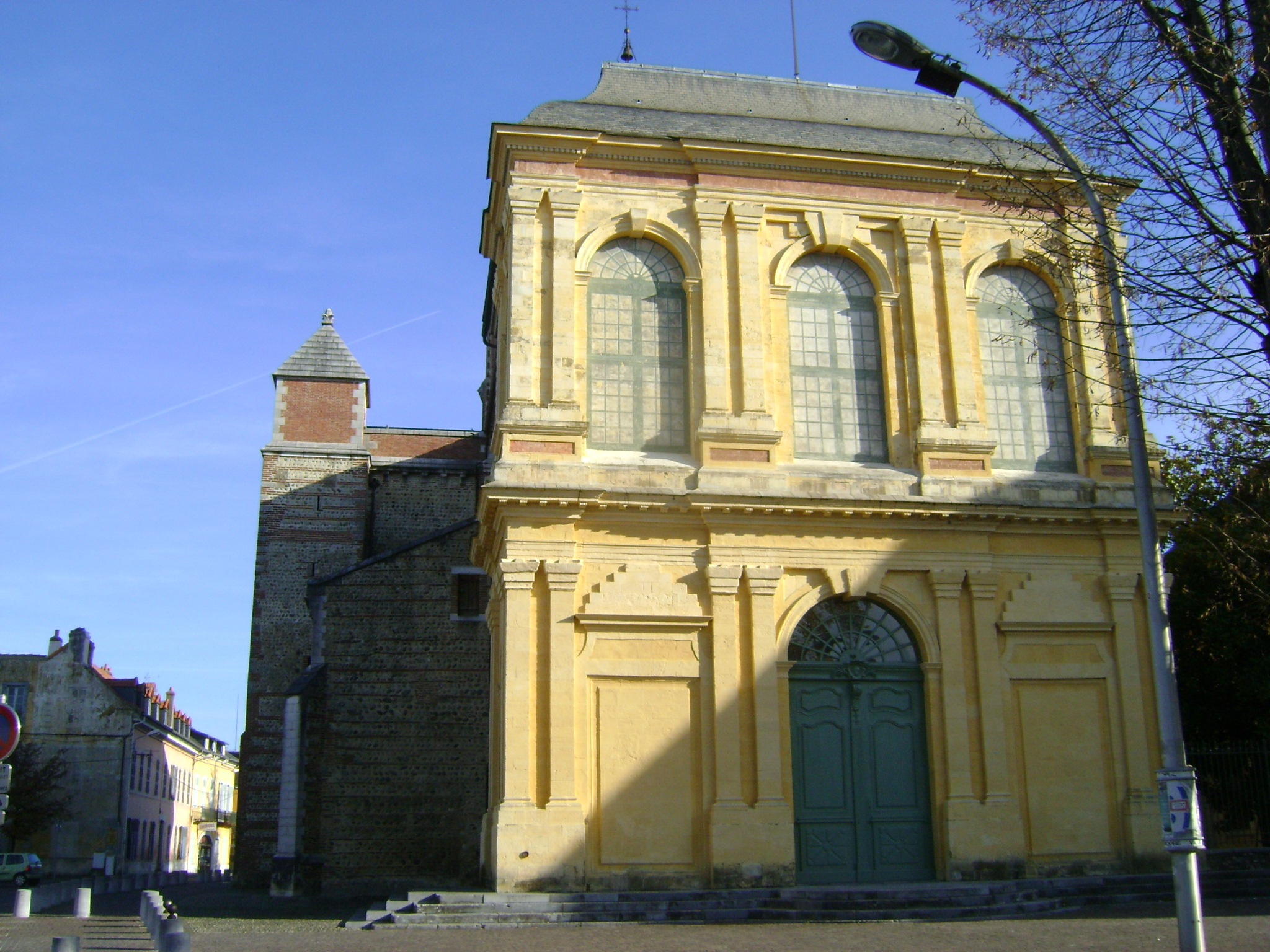
- Tarbes Cathedral

Location
- Country: France
- Ecclesiastical province: Toulouse
- Metropolitan: Archdiocese of Toulouse

Statistics
- Area: 4,535 km^{2} (1,751 sq mi)
- Population: Total; Catholics: (as of 2022); 229,200; 150,135 (65.5%)
- Parishes: 525

Information
- Denomination: Catholic Church
- Sui iuris church: Latin Church
- Rite: Roman Rite
- Established: 4th Century
- Cathedral: Cathedral of Our Lady of the See in Tarbes
- Patron saint: Nativity of Mary
- Secular priests: 74 (Diocesan); 50 (Religious Orders); 18 Permanent Deacons

Current leadership
- Pope: Leo XIV
- Bishop: Jean Marc Micas
- Metropolitan Archbishop: Guy de Kerimel
- Bishops emeritus: Jacques Perrier

Map

Website
- Website of the Diocese

The Diocese of Tarbes et Lourdes (Latin: Dioecesis Tarbiensis et Lourdensis; French: Diocèse de Tarbes et Lourdes) is a Latin Church ecclesiastical territory or diocese of the Catholic Church in France. Until 2002 Tarbes was a suffragan of the Archdiocese of Auch. It is now a suffragan of the Archdiocese of Toulouse.

Erected in the 4th century, the diocese of Tarbes is the historical diocese of Bigorre, part of the larger region of Gascony. The diocese were suppressed in 1801 following the concordat, it was restored in 1822 and has since covered the department of Hautes-Pyrénées. The name of the diocese was changed from the Tarbes to the Diocese of Tarbes et Lourdes on 20 April 1912.

In 2022, in the Diocese of Tarbes, there was one priest for every 1,210 Catholics.

== History ==
The earliest known bishop of Tarbes appears to be Syagrius, who attended the Council of Nîmes in 394.

The cathedral had been burned and seriously damaged in the French Wars of Religion by the Huguenots, and was a long time in being restored. The cathedral had fourteen Canons. Until 1524 the Canons served under the Rule of Saint Augustine; thereafter they were secular canons. There were twelve prebendaries. The Chapter had an unusually large number of dignitaries: a Provost (which became dormant), eight Archdeacons, the Cantor, the Sacristan, the Chamberlain and the Infirmarius.

In 1676 the city of Tarbes, which was under the jurisdiction of the King of France, had approximately 2000 Catholic inhabitants. In the city were convents of the Franciscans (O.Min.), Carmelites, Capucines, and Doctrinarii; there was a convent of Ursuline nuns. Elsewhere in the diocese there were convents of Dominicans, Repenties, Capucines, Carmelites, and Minims of S. Francesco di Paola. There were also five houses of Benedictine monks: Saint-Sever-de-Rustan, Saint-Savin-in-Lavadan, Saint-Pé-de-Generest, Saint-Pierre-de-Tasque, and Saint-Orenz-de-Reulle.

== Bishops of Tarbes ==
Previous Bishops of Tarbes (-et-Lourdes) include:

=== To 1200 ===
- Amelius of Tarbes (6th century)
- Bernard (attested in 1009)
- Richard (attested in 1036)
- Heraclius (attested in 1056, 1060 and 1063)
- Pontius (Ponce) (attested in 1073)
- Dodo (attested 1095)
- Bernard
- Pontius (Ponce)
- Guillaume (ca. 1120–1141)
- Bernard de Montesquiou (attested in 1141, 1164, 1175)
- Arnaud Guillaume d'Osan (present at Lateran Council of 1179)

=== 1200 to 1400 ===
- Arnaud Guillaume de Biran (ca. 1200–1223)
- Amanevus [Amanieu de Grisenhac] (attested in 1224 and 1225)
- Hugues de Pardaillan (ca. 1227–1244)
- Arnaldus Raimundi de Caudarasa [Coadrase] (attested 1250–1257)
- Arnaldus de Mille sanctis (attested 1260–1267)
- Raimundus Arnaldi de Caudarasa (1268–1308)
- Geraldus Doucet (1308–1316)
- Guillaume de Lantal (1316–1339) (transferred to Agde)
- Pierre Raimundi de Montbrun (1339–1353)
- Guillaume, O.S.B. (1353–1361)
- Bernard (1361–1374)
- Gaillard de Coadrase (1374–1392)
- Reynaud de Foix (1392– )
- Pierre d'Anglade, O.P. (1388 – ?) Administrator

=== 1400 to 1600 ===
- Bertrand (1400–1404)
- Chrétien de Altarippa, O.E.S.A. (1404–1408) (transferred to Tréguier)
- Bernard du Peyron (1408–after 1416)
- Homobonus d'Armagnac (before 1422–1427)
- Raymond Bernardi (1427–1430)
- Jean (1430 – ca. 1439)
- Roger de Foix de Castelbon (1440–1461)
- Jean (1462–1463)
- Cardinal Pierre de Foix (1463–1465) Administrator
- Louis d'Albret (Lebret) (1465–1466)
- Arnaud Raymond de Palatz (1466–1474)
- Menalde d'Aura (1474–1504)
- Thomas de Foix (1504–1514)
- Menalde de Montory (Martory) (1514–1524)
- Gabriel de Gramont (1524–1534)
- Antoine de Castelnau (1534–1539)
- Louis de Castelnau (1539–1549)
- Gentien de Bussy d'Amboise (1556–1575)
- Salvatus d'Iharse (1580–1602)

=== 1600 to 1800 ===
- Salvatus d'Iharse, le Jeune (1602–1648)
- Claude Mallier du Houssay (1649–1668)
- Marc Mallier du Houssay (1668–1675)
- Anne de la Baume de Suze (1677–1692) (transferred to Auch)
- François de Poudenx (appointed 1692; d. 1716)
- Anne-François-Guillaume du Cambout-Beçay (appointed 1719; d. 1729)
- Charles Antoine de La Roche-Aymon (appointed 1729–1740)
- Pierre de Beaupoil de Saint-Aulaire (appointed 1741; d. 1751)
- Pierre de La Romagère (appointed 1751; d. 1769)
- Michel-François de Couët du Vivier de Lorry (appointed 1769–1782)
- François de Gain de Montagnac (1782–1801)
  - Jean Guillaume Molinier (Constitutional Bishop)

Diocese "suppressed" in 1801

=== Since 1800 ===
Diocese "restored" in 1822

- Antoine-Xavier de Neirac (appointed 1817; d. 1833)
- Pierre-Michel-Marie Double (appointed 1833; d. 1844)

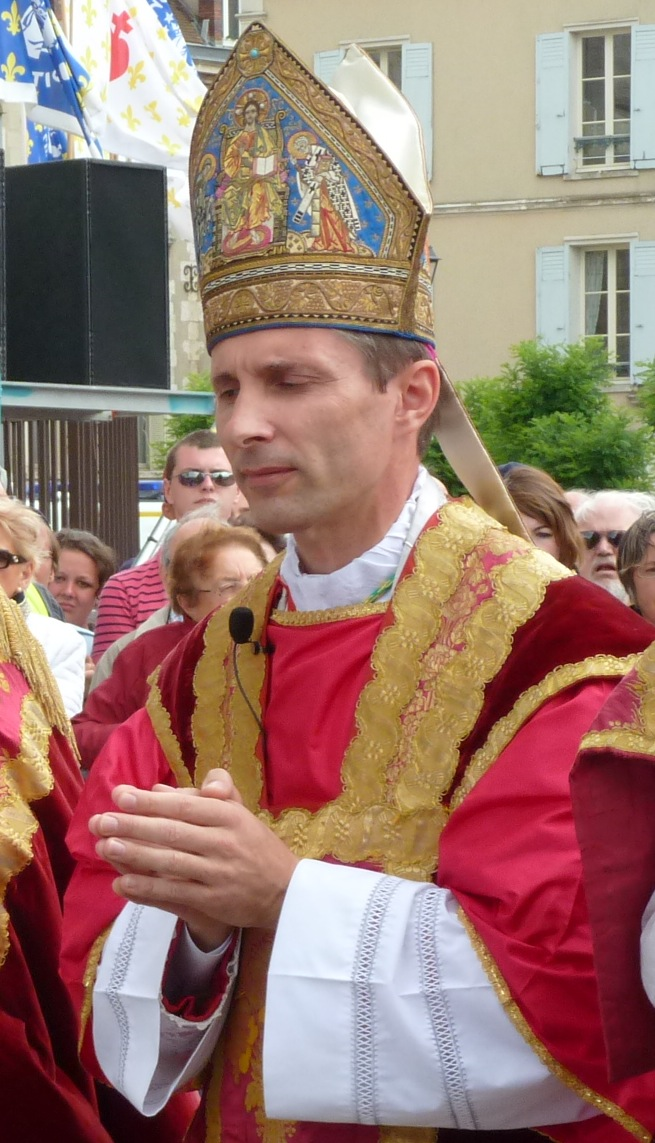
Bishop Nicholas Brouwet

- Bertrand-Sévère Mascarou Laurence (appointed 1844; d. 1870)
- Pierre-Anastase Pichenot (appointed 1870–1873) (translated to Chambéry)
- Benoit-Marie Langénieux (appointed 1873–1874)
- César-Victor-Ange-Jean-Baptiste Jourdan (appointed 1874–1882)
- Prosper-Marie Billère (appointed 1882–1899)
- François-Xavier Schoepfer (appointed 1899; d. 1927)
- Alexandre-Philibert Poirier (succeeded 1927; d. 1928)
- Pierre-Marie Gerlier (appointed 1929–1937)
- Georges Choquet (appointed 1938; d. 1946)
- Pierre-Marie Théas (appointed 1947; retired 1970)
- Henri Clément Victor Donze (appointed 1970; retired 1988)
- Jean Yves Marie Sahuquet (succeeded 1988; retired 1998)
- Jacques Jean Joseph Jules Perrier (succeeded 1998; retired 2012)
- Nicolas Jean René Brouwet (appointed 2012; translated to Nîmes August 2021)
- Jean-Marc Micas, P.S.S. (appointed 2022)

== Bibliography ==
=== Reference works ===
- Gams, Pius Bonifatius (1873). Series episcoporum Ecclesiae catholicae: quotquot innotuerunt a beato Petro apostolo. Ratisbon: Typis et Sumptibus Georgii Josephi Manz. pp. 634–635. (Use with caution; obsolete)
- Eubel, Conradus, ed. (1913). Hierarchia catholica, Tomus 1 (second ed.). Münster: Libreria Regensbergiana. (in Latin) pp. 474.
- Eubel, Conradus, ed. (1914). Hierarchia catholica, Tomus 2 (second ed.). Münster: Libreria Regensbergiana. (in Latin) p. 246.
- Gulik, Guilelmus (1923). Eubel, Conradus (ed.). Hierarchia catholica, Tomus 3 (second ed.). Münster: Libreria Regensbergiana. p. 309.
- Gauchat, Patritius (Patrice) (1935). Hierarchia catholica IV (1592-1667). Münster: Libraria Regensbergiana. pp. 326.
- Ritzler, Remigius; Sefrin, Pirminus (1952). Hierarchia catholica medii et recentis aevi V (1667-1730). Patavii: Messagero di S. Antonio. pp. 368.
- Ritzler, Remigius; Sefrin, Pirminus (1958). Hierarchia catholica medii et recentis aevi VI (1730-1799). Patavii: Messagero di S. Antonio. p. 392.

=== Studies ===
- Caddau, Louis (1911). Monographie de la cathédrale de Tarbes (in French). Paris: H. Champion.
- Du Tems, Hugues (1774). Le clergé de France, ou tableau historique et chronologique des archevêques, évêques, abbés, abbesses et chefs des chapitres principaux du royaume, depuis la fondation des églises jusqu'à nos jours, par M. l'abbé Hugues Du Tems (in French). Vol. Tome I. Paris: Delalain. pp. 522–538.
- Du Tems, Hugues (1775). Le clergé de France, ou tableau historique et chronologique des archevêques, évêques, abbés, abbesses et chefs des chapitres principaux du royaume, depuis la fondation des églises jusqu'à nos jours, par M. l'abbé Hugues Du Tems. Vol. Tome IV. Paris: Brunet.
- Jean, Armand (1891). Les évêques et les archevêques de France depuis 1682 jusqu'à 1801 (in French). Paris: A. Picard. pp. 89–92.
- Laffon, Jean Baptiste (1971). Le Diocèse de Tarbes et Lourdes (in French). Paris: Letouzey & Ané.
- Lafforque, E. (1929). "Histoire des évêques du diocèse de Tarbes". Revue des Hautes-Pyrénées. 24: 69.
- Pisani, Paul (1907). Répertoire biographique de l'épiscopat constitutionnel (1791-1802) (in French). Paris: A. Picard.
- Sainte-Marthe, Denis de (1715). Gallia Christiana, In Provincias Ecclesiasticas Distributa (in Latin). Vol. Tomus primus. Paris: Excudebat Johannes-Baptista Coignard, Regis & Academiae Gallicae Architypographus. pp. 1225–1262, Instrumenta, pp. 191–197.

=== External links ===
- Centre national des Archives de l'Église de France, L’Épiscopat francais depuis 1919, retrieved: 2016-12-24 (in French).
