= Louis de Perreau, Sieur de Castillon =

French ambassador

Louis de Perreau, Sieur de Castillon was the French ambassador to England during the reign of Henry VIII. He served at the English court from November 1537 to December 1538 and was replaced by Charles de Marillac. His predecessor was Antoine de Castelnau.

De Perreau's time as ambassador to England coincided with Henry's search for a royal wife to replace Queen Jane Seymour (who had died in October 1537). Under consideration was Mary of Guise, widow of Louis II d'Orléans, Duke of Longueville. Failing to secure the alliance, de Perreau described Henry VIII thus: "I have to deal with the most dangerous and cruel man in the world, for [when] he is in a fury, he has neither reason nor understanding left."
