= François Grudé =

French writer and bibliographer

François Grudé (born 1552, Le Mans), lord of la Croix du Maine, was a French writer and bibliographer. He wrote under the Latin pseudonym Grucithanius.

== Works ==
- La Croix du Maine, Antoine du Verdier, "Les Bibliotheques françoises", Paris, Saillant & Nyon, 1773, numbered by Google Books :
  - 1st volume La Croix du Maine, volume 1
  - 2nd volume La Croix du Maine, volume 2
  - 3rd volume Du Verdier, volume 1
  - 4th volume Du Verdier, volume 2
  - 5th volume Du Verdier, volume 3
  - 6th volume Errata, epitomes bibliothecae gesnerianae, etc.

== Sources ==
- " François Grudé", in Louis-Gabriel Michaud, Biographie universelle ancienne et moderne : histoire par ordre alphabétique de la vie publique et privée de tous les hommes avec la collaboration de plus de 300 savants et littérateurs français ou étrangers, 2nd edition, 1843–1865
