= Henri I de Saint-Nectaire =

French general and diplomat

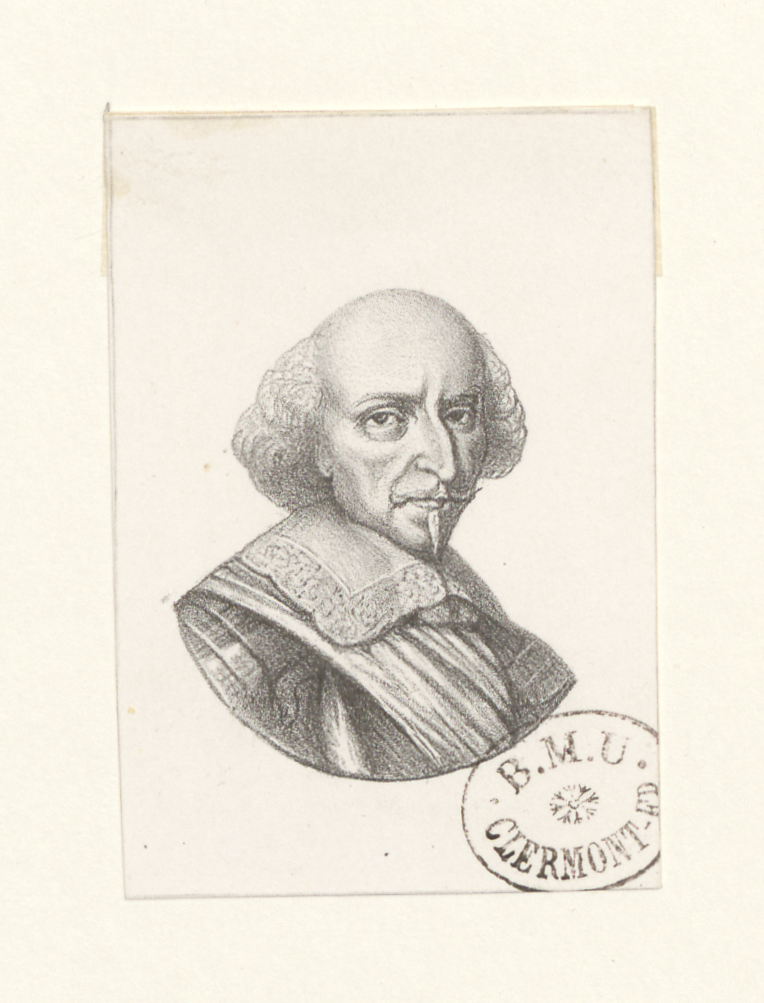
Lithography

Henri I de Saint-Nectaire, marquis de La Ferté-Nabert, (1573 – 4 January 1662 in Paris), was a French general and diplomat.

== Biography ==
He was a son of the Marquis François de Saint-Nectaire, State Councilor and Knight of the Order of the Holy Spirit, and of Jeanne de Laval, mistress of King Henry III.

He joined the King's Army at a young age and by 1622, he was Maréchal de camp in the army of Louis, Count of Soissons at La Rochelle. Then he was Lieutenant general in the government of Champagne.

From 1634 until 1637, Saint-Nectaire was ambassador to England, then ruled by King Charles I of England, but still before the English Civil War.

He was subsequently Minister of State and a Knight of the Order of the Holy Spirit.

=== Marriage and children ===
He married first Marguerite de La Châtre, daughter of Claude de La Châtre de La Maisonfort, and had

- Henri II de La Ferté-Senneterre (1599–1681), Marshal of France
- Charles de Saint Nectaire (1601–1667), married Marie D'Hautefort
- Gabriel de Saint Nectaire
- Marie de Saint Nectaire, married François de Belvezeix

Then he married in second marriage Anne de Sully-Rosny, bastard daughter of Maximilian II of Béthune.

== Sources ==
- Louis André, Claude Le Peletier, Michel Le Tellier et l'organisation de l'armée monarchique, 1980
- Anselme de Sainte-Marie, Angel of Sainte-Rosalie, Histoire de la Maison Royale de France, et des grands officiers de la Couronne
