= Antoine du Verdier =

French politician and writer

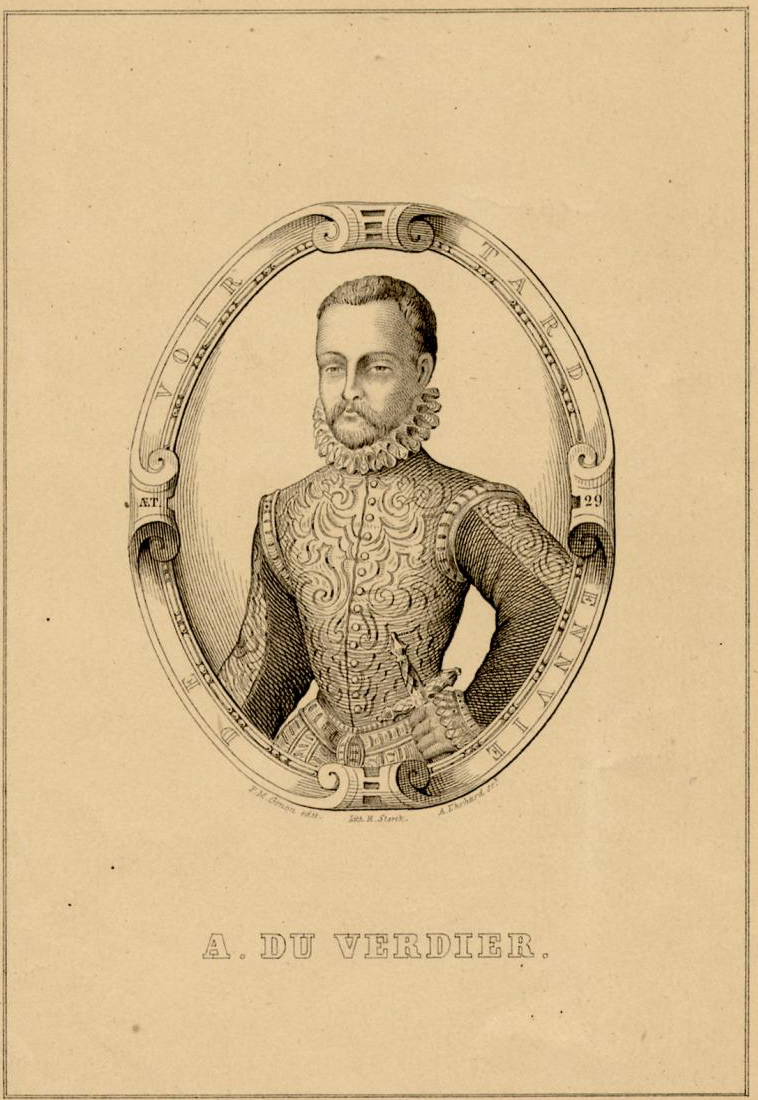
Antoine du Verdier

Antoine du Verdier (11 November 1544 – 25 September 1600), lord of Vauprivast, was a French politician and writer.

Du Verdier was born in Saint-Bonnet-le-Château, Lyonnais. He was conseiller du roi and controller-general in Lyon, but is best known for his work as a bibliographer alongside his friend and contemporary François Grudé.

== Publications ==
- Prosopographie, description des personnages-insignes, avec portraits, Lyon, 1573
- Bibliothèque d'Ant. Duverdier, contenant le catalogue de tous les auteurs qui ont écrit en français, 1585, valuable work of bibliography, reprinted in 1772–1773 with that of the La Croix du Maine.

== Sources ==
- Bouillet, Marie-Nicolas; Chassang, Alexis, eds. (1878). "DUVERDIER (Ant.)". Dictionnaire Bouillet (in French).
