= Boleyn =

A Francisation of traditional English "Bullen" coming from the French name Boulogne, Boleyn is the surname of a noble English family particularly prominent in the Tudor period. People with this surname include:

- Amy Boleyn, English noblewoman and courtier
- Anne Boleyn, Queen consort of England (1533–1536), second wife of Henry VIII and mother of Elizabeth I
- Elizabeth Boleyn, Countess of Wiltshire (c.1480-1538), mother of Anne Boleyn
- Elizabeth Boleyn, Lady Boleyn, lady-in-waiting at the court of Henry VIII, wife of Sir James Boleyn
- Geoffrey Boleyn (1406–1463), Lord Mayor of London
- George Boleyn (priest) (died 1603), Dean of Lichfield
- George Boleyn, Viscount Rochford (c.1504–1536), brother of Anne
- James Boleyn (died 1561), a courtier of Henry VIII, husband of Lady Elizabeth Boleyn
- Jane Boleyn, Viscountess Rochford (c.1505–1542), wife of George
- Mary Boleyn (c.1499–1543), Anne's sister and long-term mistress of Henry VIII
- Thomas Boleyn, 1st Earl of Wiltshire (c.1477–1539) father of Anne, George and Mary, courtier and ambassador
- William Boleyn (1451–1505), father of Thomas

== See also ==
- Boleyn family
- Boleyn Ground in London, often also known as Upton Park, formerly the football stadium of West Ham United F.C.
- Boleyn Tavern, a pub in East Ham, London
- Lady Margaret Butler (c.1454–1539), wife of William and mother of Thomas
- Dan Boleyn, a fictional character in the 1930 novel The Apes of God by Wyndham Lewis

== See also ==
- Bolin
- Bollin (surname)
- Bollen (surname)
- Bowline
