= Boleyn family =

English noble family

Boleyn
- Noble house
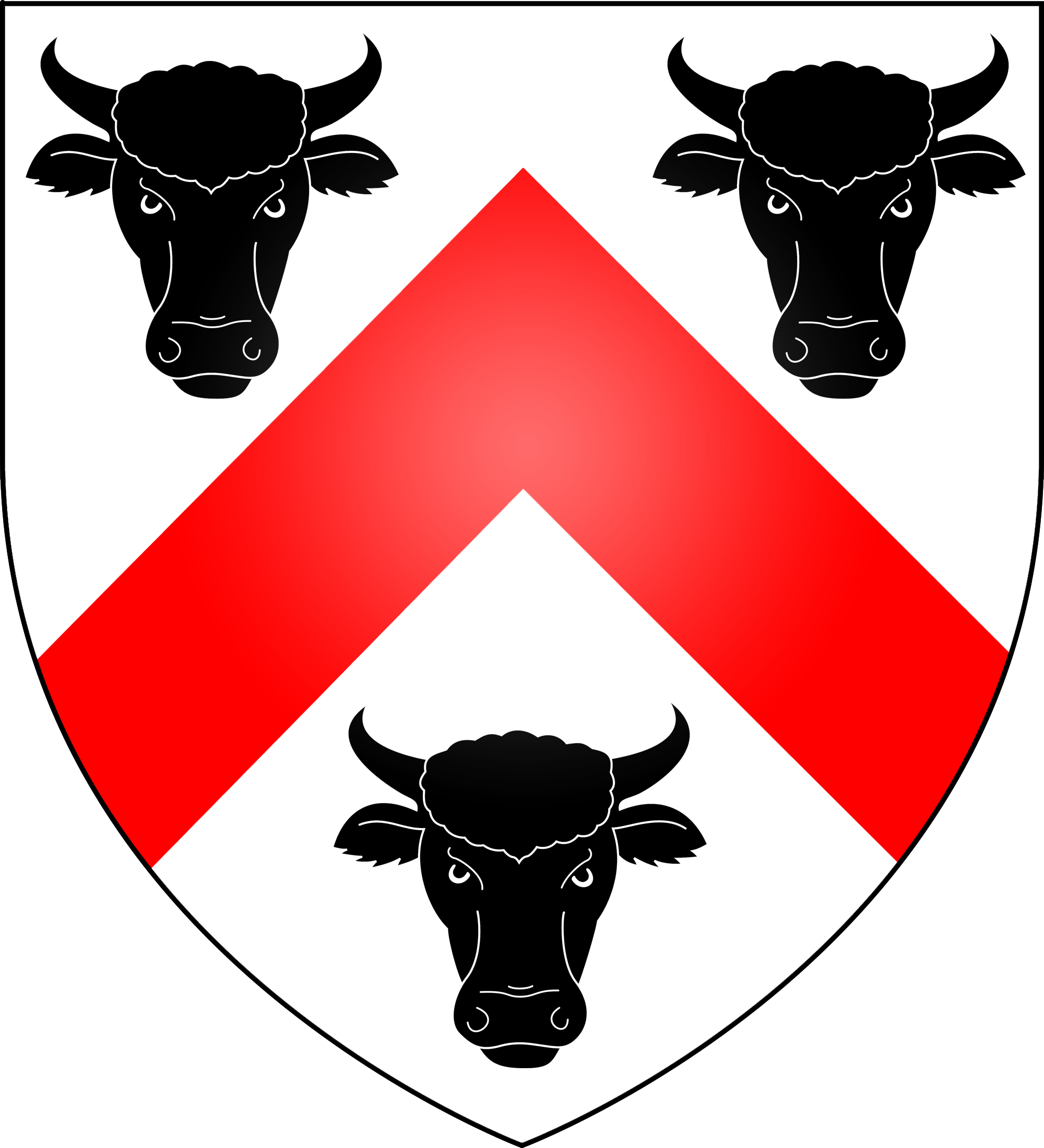
- The arms of the Boleyn family, showing three bull's heads on a white field
- Country: England
- Origin: Norfolk
- Founded: 1283; 743 years ago
- Founder: John Boleyn
- Final head: Thomas Boleyn
- Seat: Hever Castle
- Titles: Marchioness of Pembroke; Earl of Wiltshire; Earl of Ormond; Viscount Rochford; Queen consort of England
- Dissolution: 1637

The Boleyn family was a prominent English family in the gentry and aristocracy. They reached the peak of their influence during the Tudor period, when Anne Boleyn became the second wife and queen consort of Henry VIII, their daughter being the future Elizabeth I.

== History ==
John Boleyn of Salle, Norfolk first appears on the register of Walsingham Abbey. There is a possibility that John Boleyn had a father by the name of “Simon de Boleyne” who purchased lands in the aforementioned village of Salle, Norfolk in 1252.

Due to the irregularity of English spelling at this period, the name in documents is also spelled Bulleyn or Bullen.

Queen Elizabeth The Queen Mother, Queen Elizabeth II, Diana, Princess of Wales and King Charles III are descendants of Mary Boleyn, Anne Boleyn's sister.

Hever Castle in Kent was the family seat of the Boleyns and the childhood home of future queen consort Anne Boleyn. Sir Geoffrey Boleyn bought Hever Castle in 1462 and Blickling Hall in Norfolk in 1452.

== Notable members ==
- Thomas Boleyn (1400–1472), Master of Gonville Hall, Cambridge
- Geoffrey Boleyn (1406–1463) Lord Mayor of the City of London
- William Boleyn (1451–1505), Sheriff of Kent
- Thomas Boleyn (1477–1539), 1st Earl of Wiltshire
- Mary Boleyn (1499–1543), Lady-in-waiting
- Anne Boleyn (1501–1536) Queen Consort, mother of Queen Elizabeth I
- George Boleyn (1504–1536) Viscount of Rochford
- William Boleyn (died 1552) Archdeacon of Winchester
- James Boleyn (died 1561), Courtier, Chancellor of the Household
- George Boleyn (died 1603) Dean of Lichfield

== Boleyn Family tree ==
Boleyn family tree

John Boleyn I (relationship to Nicholas unclear)
Nicholas Boleyn
John Boleyn II (c. 1300 – c. 1369)	Emma
Sir John Bracton	Thomas Boleyn I (c. 1350–1411); Builder of St Peter and St Paul's, Salle	Agnes
Alice Bracton (c. 1390–?)	Geoffrey Boleyn I (c. 1380–1440); Yeoman of Salle, Norfolk	Sir Thomas Hoo (c. 1396–1455); Baron Hoo and Hastings
William Boleyn (d. 1481)	John Boleyn	The Very Rev Thomas Boleyn II (c. 1405–1472); Master of Gonville Hall, Cambridge	Sir Geoffrey Boleyn II (1406–1463); Lord Mayor of London	Anne Hoo (c. 1424–1482)	Thomas Butler; Earl of Ormond (1426–1515)
Thomas Howard (1443–1524); Duke of Norfolk	Sir Thomas Boleyn III (c. 1442–1471); Lord of Blickling Hall	Sir William Boleyn II (1451–1505); Sheriff of Kent, Norfolk and Suffolk	Lady Margaret Butler (c. 1454–1539)
Elizabeth Howard (c. 1480–1538)	Sir Thomas Boleyn (c. 1477–1539); 1st Earl of Wiltshire and Ormand	William Boleyn (1491–1571)	Sir James Boleyn (1493–1561)	Sir Edward Boleyn (c. 1496–?)
George Boleyn; Viscount Rochford (1503/4–1536)	Mary Boleyn (c. 1499–1543)	Anne Boleyn (c. 1501–1536); Queen Consort	Henry VIII (1491–1547); King of England
Elizabeth I (1533–1603); Queen of England
