= Geoffrey Boleyn =

English merchant and politician (1406–1463)

Sir Geoffrey Boleyn
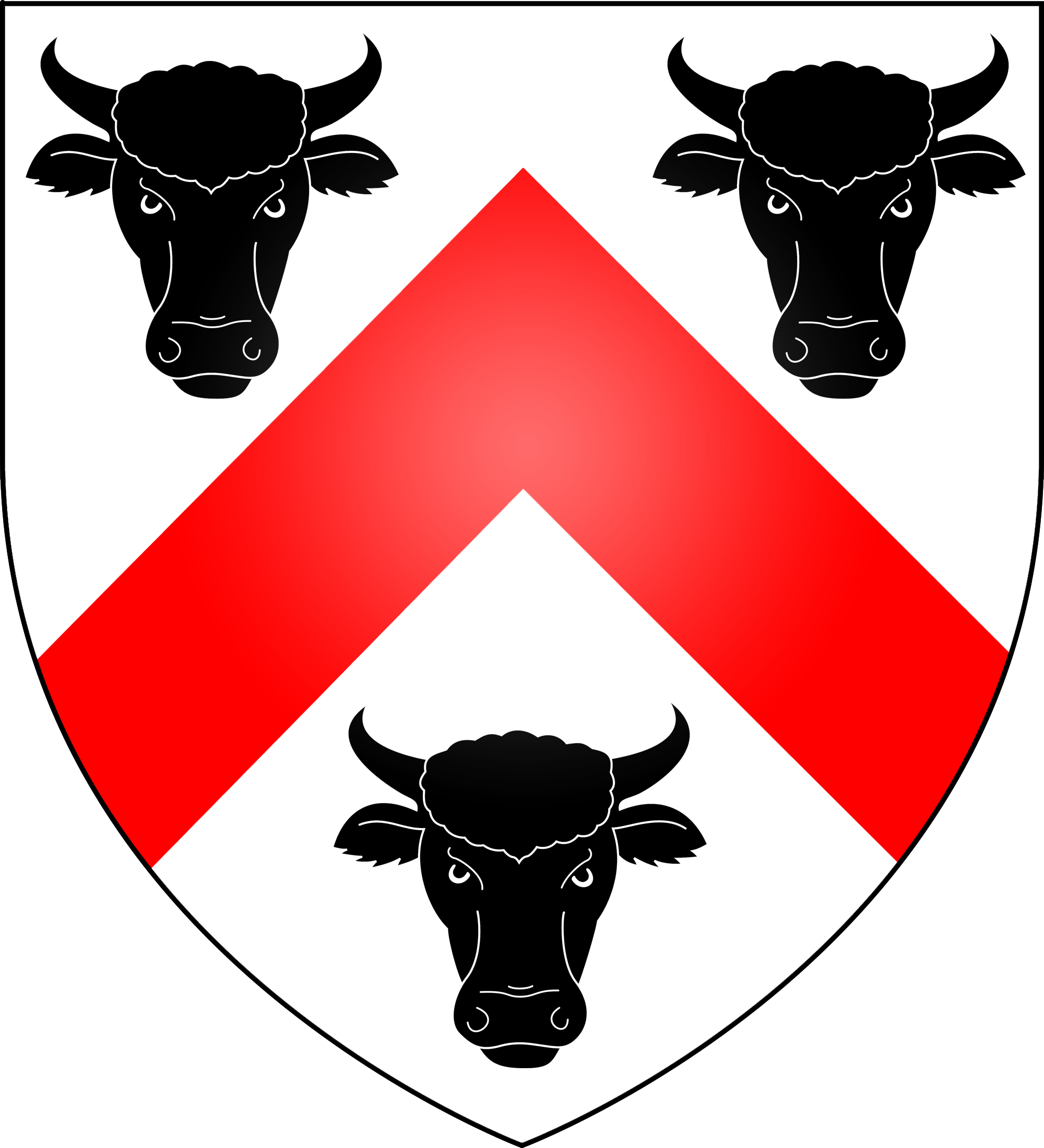
- Canting arms of Sir Geoffrey Boleyn: Argent, a chevron gules between three bull's heads afrontée sable

Lord Mayor of London
- In office 1457–1458

Sheriff of London
- In office 1446–1447

Personal details
- Born: 1406
- Died: 1463 (aged 56–57)
- Occupation: Merchant

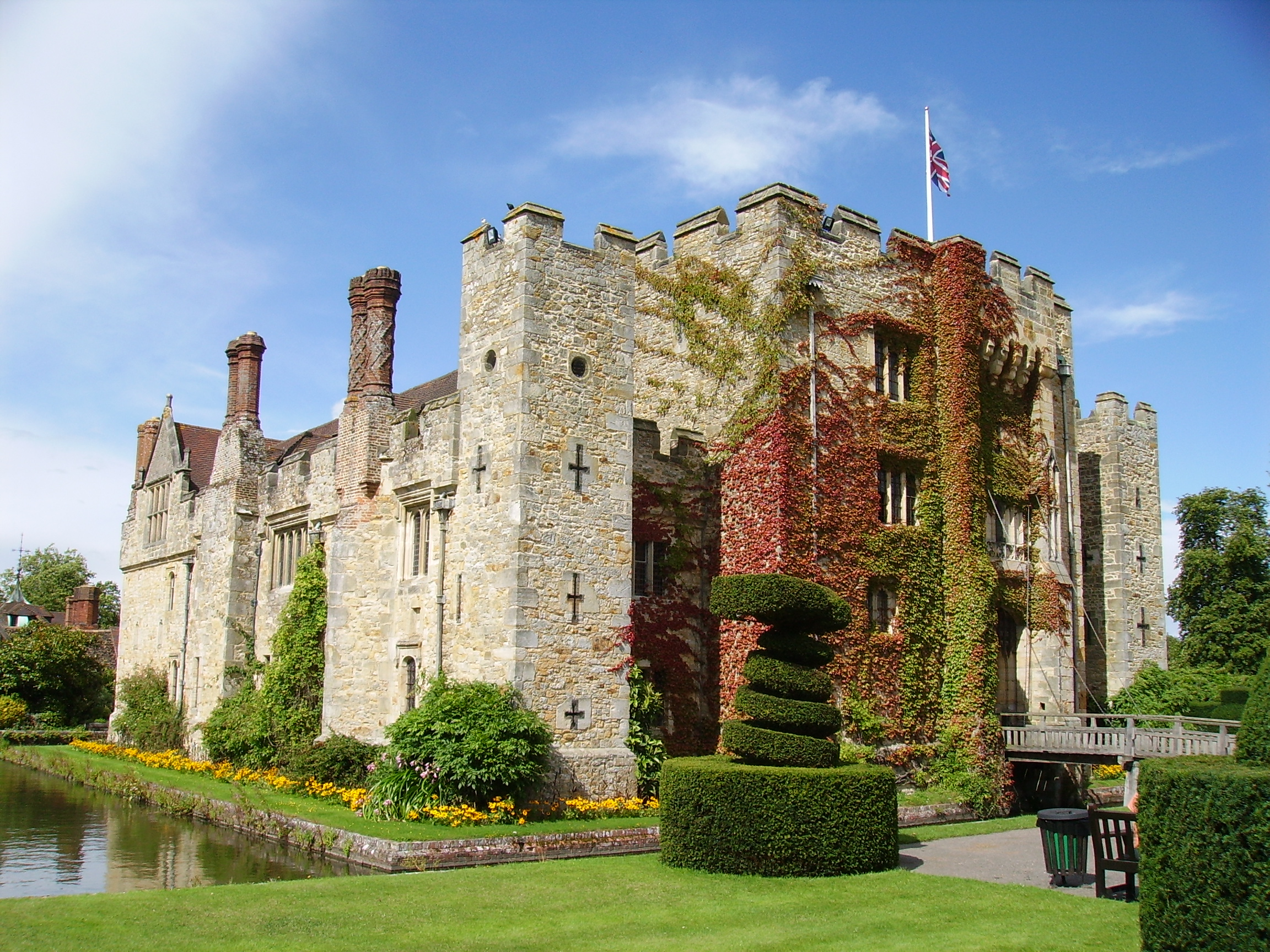
Hever Castle, Kent

Sir Geoffrey Boleyn (1406–1463; also Jeffray Bulleyn, Bullen, etc.) was an English merchant and politician who served as Lord Mayor of London from 1457 to 1458. He purchased the manor of Blickling Hall, near Aylsham, in Norfolk from Sir John Fastolf in 1452, and Hever Castle in Kent in 1462. He was the great-grandfather of Queen Anne Boleyn, the mother of Queen Elizabeth I. Sir Geoffrey built the domestic, mercantile and civic fortunes of the Boleyn family, and raised its status from the provincial gentry, as his brother Thomas Boleyn made a career of distinction in church and university, together building the family's wealth, influence and reputation.

== Family ==
Geoffrey Boleyn's father was an elder Geoffrey Boleyn (died 1440), yeoman of Salle in Norfolk, son of Thomas Boleyn (died 1411) of Salle and his wife Agnes. His mother Alice, née Bracton, whose arms he quartered with those of Boleyn, was daughter and heiress of Sir John Bracton of Norfolk. Geoffrey and Alice Boleyn of Salle are commemorated by a monumental brass in Salle Church, which shows the two figures frontally, standing, set side by side, with a memorial inscription beneath (referring also to their children) and a scroll flying between them with a Latin prayer, "God be merciful to us sinners". Around 1730, Thomas Martin of Palgrave saw two subsidiary brass groups in the slab showing their five sons and their four daughters: these have long been missing.

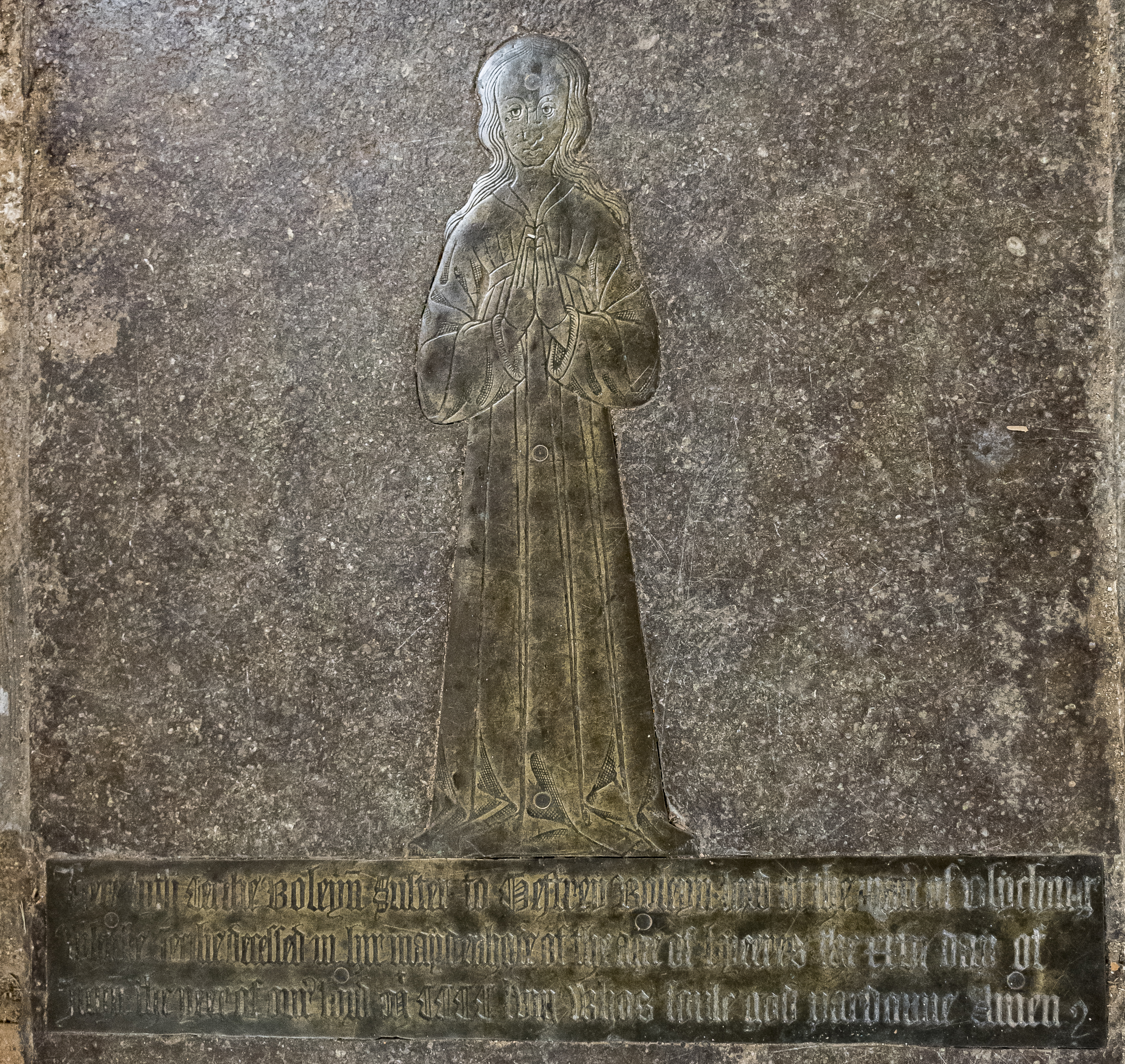
Brass to Cecilie Boleyn, Blickling, 1458

Sir Geoffrey Boleyn, the son of Geoffrey and Alice, therefore had four brothers and four sisters, some of whom may not have reached majority. The following, at least some of whom were buried elsewhere, are known from other sources:

- William Boleyn (died 1427), who settled in Lincolnshire where he is said to have founded the Lincolnshire branch of the family.
- John Boleyn
- Thomas Boleyn (died 1472), Prebendary of St. Stephen's, Westminster, Precentor and Sub-Dean of Wells Cathedral, Master of Gonville Hall, Cambridge (1454-1472), and Master of the College of All Saints, Maidstone, Kent. This Thomas, a notable figure, was executor to his brother Geoffrey's will. Thomas was buried at Wells Cathedral.
- Cecily Boleyn (1408–26 June 1458), sister of Geoffrey, to whom the manor of Stiffkey was granted in chief in 1455, and who (according to her own monumental brass at Blickling) died unmarried ("in her maidenhood") at the age of 50.

== Career ==
Boleyn went to the City of London where he was apprenticed as a hatter and gained the freedom of the City through the Company of Hatters in 1428. However, he devoted his efforts to the art of Mercery rather than that of the Hatter, and transferred to the senior livery company: in 1435/36, he appeared before the Court of Aldermen and prayed to be admitted as a Mercer, a petition which was granted. Having served as a Sheriff of London in 1446–47 (in succession to fellow Mercers Hugh Wyche and Geoffrey Feilding), as a Member of Parliament for the City of London in February 1449, and as an alderman from 1452 (Castle Baynard Ward, 1452–57), the year of Feilding's mayoralty, he became Master of the Mercers' Company for the year 1454.

In the meantime, he purchased the manor of Blickling in Norfolk from Sir John Fastolf in 1452, over which there followed a Chancery suit concerning the terms of sale. This was before the present mansion built by Hobart arose: John Leland noted, "Syr Geffrey buildid a fair house of brike at ... in Northfolke."

Transferring to the Bassishaw Ward (which he represented from 1457 to 1463), he became Lord Mayor of London in 1457–58 and was knighted by King Henry VI. During a gathering in the City of the leaders of the Yorkist and Lancastrian factions at a Great Council in November 1457, Sir Geoffrey Boleyn raised a strong force of citizens to ensure that there was no breach of the peace. In the first year of Edward IV the manor of Abbotsley, Huntingdon ("formerly called Scottesmanner"), was confirmed to him by patent, and in 1461 he and "Geffray Feldyng" headed the list of contributors towards a prest of 500 marks granted to the king by the fellowship of the Mercers for the Earl of Warwick to go into the North.

In 1462, Geoffrey Boleyn purchased the Kentish manors of Hever Cobham and Hever Brocas (the two moieties of the manor of Hever) from Sir Thomas Cobham, as the final step in his path of social aggrandisement, shortly before his death: the work of starting to open the castle up (with the insertion of cinquefoil cusped lights under square hood moulds) is perhaps attributable to his son Sir William Boleyn. Of Blickling, Blomefield remarks, "He built the chapel of St Thomas, at the east end of the north aisle of Blickling church, and adorned the windows with beautiful painted glass, and there still remain his own arms impaling his wife's in a window there, and this inscription:

'...... Galfrida Boleyn quondam Domini istius Ville, et Anne Consortis sue, qui istam Capellam una cum Fenestra fieri [fecerunt], quorum animabus propicietur Deus.' "
(.... of Geoffrey Boleyn sometime Lord of this Manor, and of Anne his Consort, who had this Chapel made along with the Window, whose souls may God prosper.)

That was in Blomefield's time, but the church was almost entirely rebuilt in the 19th century.

== Death & burial ==
Geoffrey died on June 17, 1463 in his home on Milk Street, City of London. He was buried in the Church of St Lawrence Jewry in the City of London: his will was proved in July 1463. He left £100 to make a new rood-loft for St Lawrence church, and 1000 marks to each of his three unmarried daughters. By his inquisition post mortem, held in that year, it was shown that in Kent he held the manors of Kemsing, Seal, Hever Cobham and Hever Brocays, and Chiddyngton; in Sussex, Pashley Manor in Ticehurst (as of the Rape of Hastings); in London, various properties in the area of St Mary Aldermary church, Wood Street, Milk Street and Westcheap; and in Norfolk, Blickling, Mulbarton, Horsford, Holkham (as of Buckenham Castle), Stiffkey, Filby, Postwick, Carbrooke and West Lexham. Of these his widow Anna Boleyn (née Hoo) was holding only Mulbarton manor and advowson in her own right, at her death and inquisition in 2 Richard III.

The church of St Lawrence Jewry was destroyed in the Great Fire of London, but the memorial inscription was recorded by John Weever:

"Hic incineratur corpus quondam Gaulfridi Bulleyn, civis, merceri et majoris London, qui ab hac luce migravit 1463, cuius anime pax sit perpetua."
(Here lies in ashes the body sometime of Geoffrey Boleyn, citizen, mercer and mayor of London, who went from this light in 1463, upon whose soul be perpetual peace.)

== Marriage and issue ==
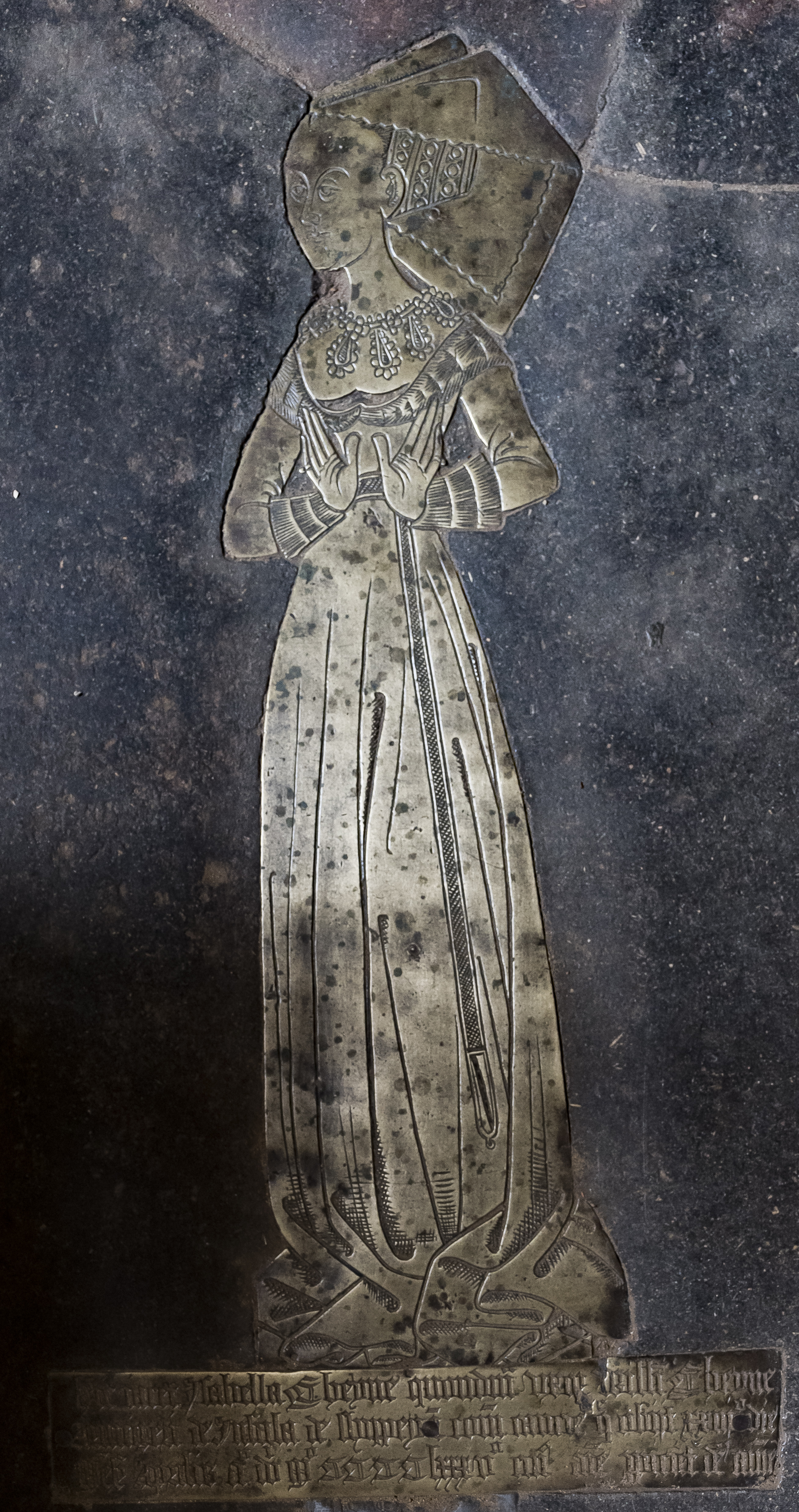
Monumental brass of Isabel Cheyney (d.1485), eldest daughter of Geoffrey Boleyn, Blickling Church

Geoffrey Boleyn married twice. His first wife, mentioned in his will, was named Dionisia. His second wife was Anne Hoo (1424–1484), the only child and heiress of Thomas Hoo, Baron Hoo and Hastings (c. 1396–1455), a Knight of the Garter, by his first wife Elizabeth Wychingham, a daughter of Sir Nicholas Wychingham. (Anne had three half-sisters by her father's second marriage). By Anne Hoo he had issue two sons and three daughters, as given by most sources (although the Norfolk historian Blomefield (1807) gives three sons and four daughters, perhaps inaccurately):

- Thomas Boleyn (died 30 April 1471), of the City of London, eldest son, buried in the Church of St Lawrence Old Jewry, beside his father.
- Sir William Boleyn (1451–1505), a member of the Worshipful Company of Mercers, who married Margaret Butler, a daughter and co-heiress of Thomas Butler, 7th Earl of Ormond, by whom he had issue including Thomas Boleyn, 1st Earl of Wiltshire, the father of Queen Anne Boleyn, second wife of King Henry VIII.
- Isabel Boleyn (aka Alicia) (died 1485), who at some time after 1463 married William Cheyney (1444-1487), son and heir of Sir John Cheyney of Shurland Hall, Sheppey, Kent. Her monumental brass survives in Blickling Church.
- Alice Boleyn (died c.1480), who at some time after 1463 married Sir John Fortescue (d.1500) of Ponsborne Park, Newgate Street, Hertfordshire, by whom she had issue including the martyr Adrian Fortescue (1476-1539).
- Anne Boleyn (died c.1509), who at some time after 1463 married Sir Henry Heydon (1425-1504) of Baconsthorpe, Norfolk, by whom she had eight children.

== Minor relatives ==
- Simon Boleyn, parochial chaplain of Salle, Norfolk died 3 August 1482.
- James Boleyn of Gunthorpe, Norfolk, died 1493 (executor to Simon's will).
- Thomas Boleyn of Gunthorpe, Norfolk (executor to Simon's will).
- Joan (Boleyn), named in her brother Simon's will. She married (1) Alan Roos of Salle (died 1463): he was receiver of rents for the Salle properties of Margaret Paston (née Mauteby, d. 1484). Alan was son of Thomas Roos (who died 12 October 1440), a prosperous merchant who built the north transept chapel and who, like the Boleyns of Salle, was a member of the Guild of the Holy Trinity of Coventry. She married (2) Robert Aldrych, who died in 1474.

Historian Elizabeth Norton describes the Geoffrey Boleyn who died in 1440 as their great-uncle.

== Arms ==
The original ("ancient") arms of the Boleyn family are blazoned Argent, a chevron gules between three bull's heads afrontée sable. Sir Geoffrey Boleyn quartered the arms of Bracton (Azure, three mullets and a chief dauncettée or)

== See also ==
- Boleyn family

== Sources ==
- Cokayne, George Edward (1949). The Complete Peerage, edited by Geoffrey H. White. Vol. XI. London: St. Catherine Press. p. 51.
- Cokayne, George Edward (1945). The Complete Peerage, edited by H.A. Doubleday. Vol. X. London: St. Catherine Press. pp. 137–142.
- Hughes, Jonathan (2007). "Boleyn, Thomas, earl of Wiltshire and earl of Ormond (1476/7–1539), courtier and nobleman". Oxford Dictionary of National Biography (online ed.). Oxford University Press. doi:10.1093/ref:odnb/2795. (Subscription, Wikipedia Library access or UK public library membership required.)
