= Margaret Dymoke =

English lady-in-waiting of Henry VIII's court

Margaret Dymoke (born c. 1500) was a lady-in-waiting at the court of Henry VIII of England. Her married names were Vernon, Coffin and Manners. She was born around 1500 in Scrivelsby, Lincolnshire, the daughter of Sir Robert Dymoke of Scrivelsby and Jane Cressner. Her first husband was Richard Vernon of Haddon (d. 1517), by whom she had at least two children. Her second husband was Sir William Coffin, Master of the Horse to Anne Boleyn, the second wife of Henry VIII.

In 1536 five women were appointed to serve Queen Anne while she was imprisoned in the Tower and to report to Sir William Kingston, the Lieutenant of the Tower, and through him to the King's chief minister, Thomas Cromwell, all that the Queen said. These women included Margaret; Queen Anne's aunt, Lady Anne Shelton; Lady Mary Kingston, the wife of Sir William Kingston, the Lieutenant of the Tower; Lady Elizabeth Boleyn, Queen Anne's aunt by marriage; and Elizabeth Stoner, wife of the King's Serjeant-at-Arms. Sir William Kingston described the five as "honest and good women", but Queen Anne said that it was "a great unkindness in the King to set such about me as I have never loved".

Margaret went on to become the lady-in-waiting of the King's third wife, Jane Seymour. Her third husband was Sir Richard Manners.

== Ancestry ==
Ancestry of Margaret Dymoke

4. Sir Thomas Dymoke (abt 1428-bef 12 Mar 1470)
2. Sir Robert Dymoke (abt 1461-1544)
5. Margaret Welles (d. 1480)
1. Margaret Dymoke
6. Alexander Cressener or Cresnore
3. Jane Cressener
7. Cecily Ratcliffe

== Issue ==
- Sir George Vernon (c. 1508 – 1565)
- Elizabeth Vernon
