= Thomas Boleyn =

Thomas Boleyn may refer to:

- Thomas Boleyn (priest) (died 1472), Master of Gonville Hall, great grand uncle of Queen Anne Boleyn
- Thomas Boleyn, 1st Earl of Wiltshire (1477–1539), father of Anne Boleyn
- Thomas Boleyn (The Tudors), character on the television series The Tudors
