= Anne Shelton (courtier) =

English courtier (c.1483–1556)

Anne Boleyn
- Lady Shelton
- Born: c. 1483; Blickling, Norfolk, England
- Died: 8 January 1556 (aged 72–73); Norwich, Norfolk, England
- Buried: Carrow Abbey
- Spouse: John Shelton
- Issue: Madge Shelton; John, Lord Shelton; Mary Shelton; Ralph Shelton; Thomas Shelton; Anne Shelton
- Father: William Boleyn
- Mother: Margaret Butler

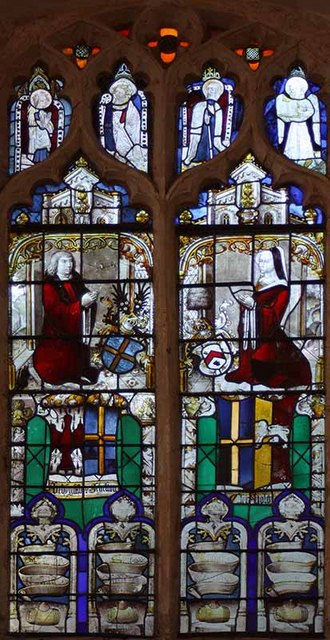
St. Mary's Church, Shelton, Norfolk – stained glass window showing w:Sir John Shelton of Shelton Hall and his wife Anne Boleyn

Anne, Lady Shelton (née Boleyn; c. 1483 – 8 January 1556) was a sister of Thomas Boleyn, 1st Earl of Wiltshire, and one of the aunts of his daughter, Queen Anne Boleyn, the second wife of King Henry VIII.

== Life ==
Anne Boleyn was born at Blickling, Norfolk, the daughter of William Boleyn and Margaret Butler, daughter of Thomas Butler, 7th Earl of Ormond and granddaughter of Joan de Beauchamp. She married John Shelton before 1503.

In 1533, Lady Shelton and her sister, Lady Alice Clere, were placed in charge of the household of the King's daughter, Mary. There is some evidence that Lady Shelton was harsh towards the young Mary, often taunting her with Elizabeth's higher status, but it is widely believed that she never resorted to actually hitting the young girl to chastise her. She received letters from Queen Anne criticising Mary. By July 1536 John Shelton was comptroller of the household established for Mary and Queen Anne Boleyn's daughter, Princess Elizabeth.

In the same year five women were appointed to serve Queen Anne while she was imprisoned in the Tower and to report to William Kingston, the Lieutenant of the Tower, and through him to the king's chief minister, Thomas Cromwell, all that the Queen said. These women included Lady Shelton, who had perhaps fallen out with Queen Anne during Henry VIII's affair with Anne's first cousin, Lady Shelton's daughter, Mary Shelton. The other women to attend Anne were Kingston's wife, Lady Mary Kingston; Lady Elizabeth Boleyn, Queen Anne's aunt by marriage; Lady Coffin, the wife of Queen Anne's Master of the Horse; and Elizabeth Stoner, wife of the King's Serjeant-at-Arms. Kingston described the five as "honest and good women", but Queen Anne said "I thynke [moche onkindnes yn the] kyng to put seche abowt me as I never loved." When in 1536 the queen was arrested and taken to the Tower, Lady Shelton was dismissed from her service. Four days later Anne Boleyn was executed. Historians have debated as to whether Lady Shelton and Lady Coffin were still in her service at the time, and whether she was one of the "four young ladies" said to have attended and escorted Anne to the scaffold.

Lady Shelton was widowed on 21 December 1539, and her husband was buried in the chancel of Shelton church. He was said to have been "a man of great possessions", which he sought to pass on to his heirs contrary to the Statute of Uses. When the stratagem came to light after Shelton's death, the lawyers involved were punished, and an Act of Parliament was passed annulling such "crafty conveyances".

== Death ==
Lady Shelton died on 8 January 1556, at Norwich. It is unknown whether she was buried at Shelton church or Carrow Abbey, but her image appears in the stained glass windows of St. Mary's Church in Shelton. Her will was proved at the Consistory Court of Norwich on 1 June 1556.

== Issue ==
Lady Shelton had three sons and seven daughters. A daughter named as 'Madge' Shelton is said to have been a mistress of Henry VIII; it is not known if Madge refers to Margaret or Mary Shelton.

- Madge Shelton (died before 11 September 1583), married Thomas Wodehouse (or Woodhouse) of Kimberley.
- John Shelton (1500 – November 1558), 22nd Lord of Shelton, married Margaret Parker, daughter of Henry Parker, 10th Baron Morley and elder sister to Jane Boleyn, Viscountess Rochford.
- Mary Shelton (died 8 Jan 1570/71), married first Sir Anthony Heveningham, and secondly Philip Appleyard, the half-brother of Amy Robsart
- Ralph Shelton (died 26 Sep 1561), married Amy Wodehouse or Woodhouse (sister of Thomas, who married Margaret Shelton).
- Thomas Shelton (died after 1579), married Anne Appleyard
- Anne Shelton (c.1505–1563), married first Edmund Knyvet, and secondly Christopher Coote, Esq.
- Gabriella Shelton (died October 1558).
- Elizabeth Shelton (died after 1561).
- Amy Shelton (died November 1579).
- Emma Shelton (died after 1556).

== Footnotes ==
=== Secondary sources ===
- Axton, Marie; Catley, James P, eds. (2000). Triumphs of English: Henry Parker, Lord Morley, Translator to the Tudor Court; New Essays in Interpretation. The British Library.
- Bindoff, S.T. (1982). The House of Commons 1509–1558. Vol. III. London: Secker & Warburg.
- Block, Joseph S. (2006). Shelton family (per. 1504–1558), gentry. Oxford Dictionary of National Biography.
- Erickson, Carolly (1978). Anne Boleyn. London.
- Hughes, Jonathan (2007). "Boleyn, Thomas, earl of Wiltshire and earl of Ormond (1476/7–1539), courtier and nobleman". Oxford Dictionary of National Biography (online ed.). Oxford University Press. doi:10.1093/ref:odnb/2795. (Subscription, Wikipedia Library access or UK public library membership required.)
- Ives, E.W. (2004). "Anne (Anne Boleyn) (c.1500–1536), queen of England, second consort of Henry VIII". Oxford Dictionary of National Biography (online ed.). Oxford University Press. doi:10.1093/ref:odnb/557. (Subscription, Wikipedia Library access or UK public library membership required.)
- Richardson, Douglas (2004). Kimball G. Everingham (ed.). Plantagenet Ancestry: A Study in Colonial and Medieval Families. Baltimore, Maryland: Genealogical Publishing Company Inc. ISBN 9780806317502.
- Shelton, Z.F. (1962). The Sheltons. Montgomery, Alabama.
- Weir, Alison (1991). The Six Wives of Henry VIII. New York: Grove Weidenfeld.
- Weir, Alison (2009). The Lady in the Tower: The Fall of Anne Boleyn. London.
