= Blickling =

Village in Norfolk, England

Coordinates: 52.809°N 1.231°E

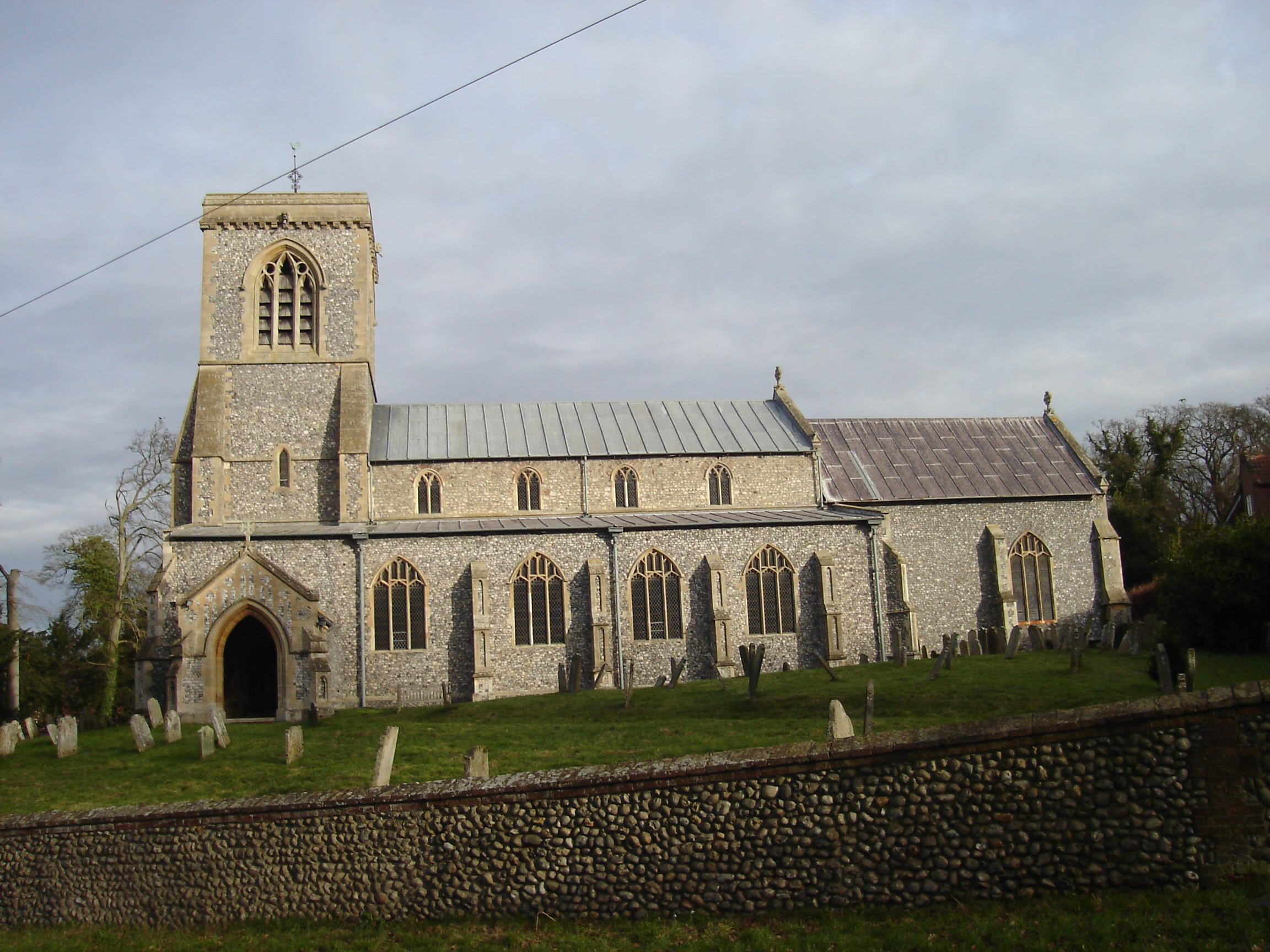
- The Church of St Andrew

- Location within Norfolk
- Area: 8.62 km^{2} (3.33 sq mi)
- Population: 111 (2021)
  - Density: 13/km^{2} (34/sq mi)
- OS grid reference: TG1775428491
  - London: 128 miles (206.0 km)
- Civil parish: Blickling
- District: Broadland
- Shire county: Norfolk
- Region: East
- Country: England
- Sovereign state: United Kingdom
- Post town: Norwich
- Postcode district: NR11
- Dialling code: 01263
- Police: Norfolk
- Fire: Norfolk
- Ambulance: East of England
- UK Parliament: Broadland and Fakenham

Blickling is a village and civil parish in the Broadland district of the English county of Norfolk. It is 1.5 miles (2.4 km) north-west of Aylsham and 13 miles (21 km) north of Norwich. Most of the village is located within the Blickling Estate, which has been owned by the National Trust since 1940.

== History ==
Blickling's name is of Anglo-Saxon origin. It is listed in the Domesday Book as a settlement of 44 households in the hundred of South Erpingham. In 1086, the village was part of the estates of William the Conqueror and William, Bishop of Thetford.

Adjacent to the hall is the Buckinghamshire Arms public house. The present building and barn were built in 1700, although an ale house was recorded in the early 17th century.

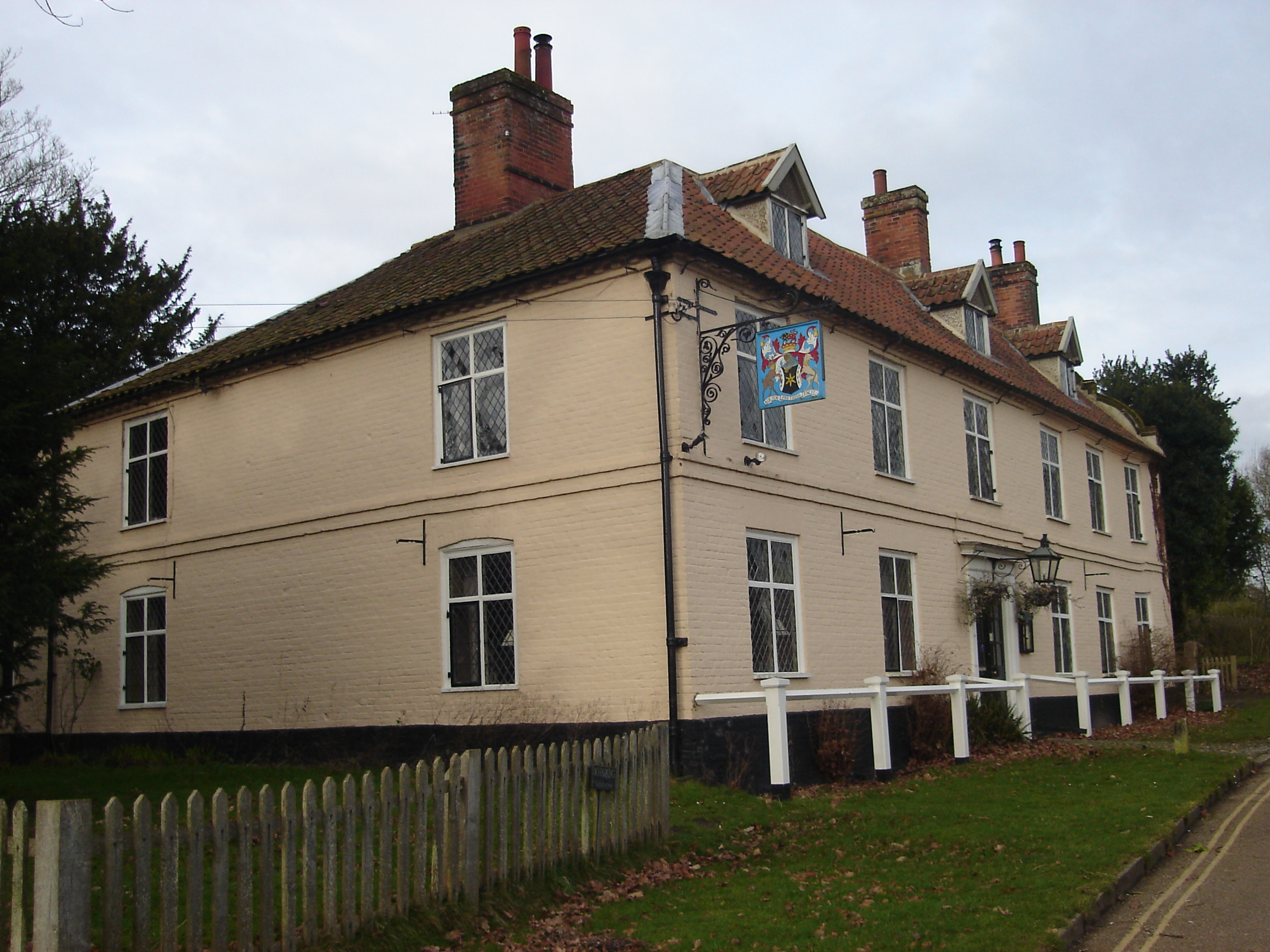
The Buckinghamshire Arms

To the west of the B1354 road is Silvergate, a hamlet of estate cottages, some of which are thatched and Grade II listed.

== Geography ==
According to the 2021 census, the population of Blickling is 111 people (which decreased from 113 in 2011) living in a total area of 3.3 square miles (8.5 km^{2}).

The River Bure runs through the parish.

== Church ==
Blickling's parish church is dedicated to Saint Andrew and was extensively remodelled in the 19th century, first by George Edmund Street and later by William Butterfield. Inside the church there is an elaborate memorial to William Kerr, Eighth Marquess of Lothian as well as a Fifteenth Century font. There are numerous memorial bronzes including one to Sir Nicholas Dagworth, a Fourteenth Century soldier and diplomat, and multiple dedicated to members of the Boleyn family.

== Blickling Hall ==
Blickling is dominated by Blickling Hall. The hall is most famous as the residence of the Boleyn family, but also contains a significant collection of manuscripts in its library. The building and surrounding parkland has been in the possession of the National Trust since 1940.

== Governance ==
Blickling is part of the electoral ward of Aylsham for local elections and is part of the district of Broadland. The village's national constituency is Broadland and Fakenham.

== Notable people ==
- Steff Aquarone MP, (b.1984) British politician.
- Anne Boleyn, (c.1501–1536) Queen of England and English noblewoman.
- Sir Geoffrey Boleyn, (1406–1463) English merchant and politician.
- George Boleyn, Viscount Rochford, (c.1504–1536) English courtier.
- Lady Mary Boleyn, (c.1499–1543) English courtier and mistress of King Henry VIII.
- Sir William Boleyn KB, (1451–1505) English landowner.
- Sir Henry Hobart, 1st Baronet, (1560–1625) English politician and lawyer.
- Sir Henry Hobart, 4th Baronet, (1657–1698) English politician and nobleman.
- Sir John Hobart, 3rd Baronet, (1628–1683) English politician and landowner.
- Sir John Hobart, Baron Intwood, (1593–1647) English politician and nobleman.
- Anne, Lady Shelton, (1483–1556) English courtier.
