= Henry Jerningham =

16th-century English politician

Sir Henry Jerningham
- Born: 1509/10
- Died: 6 September 1572; Costessey, Norfolk, England
- Spouse: Frances Baynham
- Issue: Henry Jerningham; William Jerningham; Francis Jerningham; Mary Jerningham; Jeronyma Jerningham
- Father: Edward Jerningham
- Mother: Mary Scrope

Sir Henry Jerningham KB (1509/10 – 6 September 1572) was an English courtier during the Tudor period. He was a Gentleman Pensioner during the reign of Henry VIII. In the succession crisis of 1553 he was one of the foremost supporters of Mary Tudor, and after her accession was one of her most trusted servants, being appointed Vice-Chamberlain of the Household, Captain of the Yeomen of the Guard, and a member of the Privy Council.

== Family ==
Henry Jerningham was the son of Edward Jerningham (died 6 January 1515) of Somerleyton, Suffolk, and Mary Scrope (died 15 August 1548), in her first marriage. His mother was one of the nine daughters of Richard Scrope (died 1485) of Upsall, Yorkshire (second son of Henry Scrope, 4th Baron Scrope of Bolton (1418–1459)), by Eleanor (died 1505/06), daughter of Norman Washbourne (1433–1482). Through his mother he was a nephew of Elizabeth Scrope (died 1537), who married first William Beaumont, 2nd Viscount Beaumont, and secondly, John de Vere, 13th Earl of Oxford, and also of Margaret Scrope (died 1515), who married Edmund de la Pole, 3rd Duke of Suffolk.

By his mother (in this her first marriage) Henry Jerningham is said to have had three brothers and a sister.

- Ferdinand Jerningham.
- Edmund Jerningham (died 9 February 1546), whose wardship was granted to his mother's second husband, Sir William Kingston. He was a Gentleman of the Bedchamber to King Henry VIII
- Edward Jerningham, born after the death of his father.
- Elizabeth Jerningham, Maid of Honour to Queen Mary I.

By his father's first marriage to Margaret Bedingfield, Jerningham had several brothers and sisters of the half blood, including Sir John Jerningham of Somerleyton, and Lady Anne Grey.

Jerningham's father died in 1515, and by 1532 his mother had married Sir William Kingston, who had been appointed Constable of the Tower of London on 28 May 1524.

== Career ==
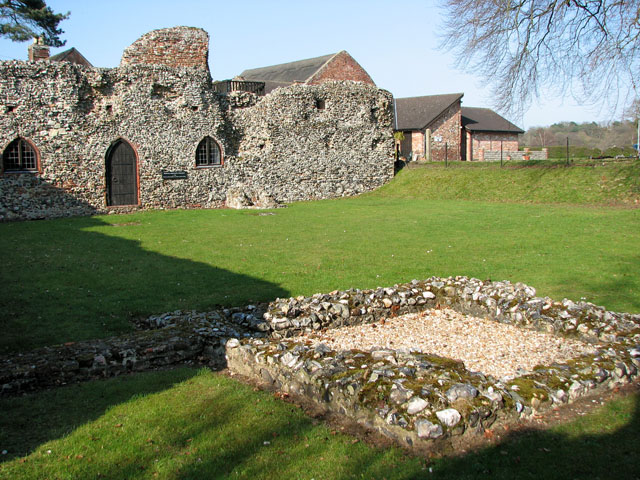
Ruins of St Olave's Priory, granted to Sir Henry Jerningham in 1546

Jerningham was admitted to the Inner Temple in 1528, and in the same year was appointed Constable of Gloucester Castle. At about the same time he entered the service of Henry VIII's elder daughter, Mary Tudor, as a sewer. He became one of Henry VIII's Gentlemen Pensioners about 1540, and thereafter was present at "major state occasions", and took part in the King's campaign in France in 1544 with his own contingent of five horsemen. In 1544 he and his wife were granted the manor of Wingfield in Suffolk, and in 1546 he was granted the site of the former St Olave's Priory in Herringfleet.

Little is known of his career under King Edward VI. However he was among the first to join the future Queen Mary I at Kenninghall when John Dudley, 1st Duke of Northumberland, attempted to place Lady Jane Grey on the throne after King Edward's death in 1553. He raised troops in Suffolk on Mary's behalf, and at her accession to the throne she appointed him Vice-Chamberlain of the Household, and Captain of the Guard. He was created a Knight of the Bath at Mary's coronation, and shortly thereafter was sworn to the Privy Council. His wife, Frances, became one of the Queen's gentlewomen. Further rewards followed in the form of grants of lands, including the manor of Costessey, one of the largest manors in Norfolk, where he rebuilt Costessey Hall.

He played a decisive role in the suppression of Wyatt's rebellion in 1554, and "was clearly one of the Queen's most trusted servants". In December 1557 he became Master of the Horse, an appointment accompanied by the grant of an annuity of £300.

He was a Knight of the Shire throughout Queen Mary I's reign, four times for Suffolk between 1553 and 1555, and once for Gloucestershire in 1558.

Queen Mary appointed Jerningham one of the six assistant executors of her will. However Queen Elizabeth I dismissed him from office. He retired to Costessey Hall, where he made his will on 15 August 1572, and died on 6 September at the age of sixty-three. He was buried in the parish church at Costessey. He was survived by his wife, Frances, by two of his sons, Henry and William, and by one of his daughters, Jeronyma. His will was proved on 27 May 1573.

== Marriage and issue ==
Jerningham's marriage is said to have been arranged by his stepfather, Sir William Kingston. In 1536 he married Kingston's granddaughter, Frances Baynham, the daughter of Sir George Baynham of Clearwell, Gloucestershire. By her he had three sons and two daughters, as follows:

- Henry Jerningham
- William Jerningham
- Francis Jerningham
- Mary Jerningham, who married Sir Thomas Southwell (died 1568) of Woodrising, Norfolk
- Jeronyma Jerningham, who married Charles Waldegrave of Stanninghall.

His widow, Frances Jerningham died in 1583. Her will mentions an enamelled gold pomander and a debt of £10 to Queen Mary's chamberer and gentlewoman of the privy chamber Jane Russell. She bequeated rings as tokens of affection to Lady Petre and to Edith Brediman who had also served Queen Mary.

Political offices
Preceded by Sir John Gates	Vice-Chamberlain of the Household; 1553–1557	Succeeded by Sir Henry Bedingfeld
Preceded by Sir John Gates	Captain of the Yeomen of the Guard; 1553–1558	Succeeded by Sir William St Loe
