= Bollen =

Bollen may refer to:

- Bollen (surname)
- Böllen, a municipality of Germany
- Bollén, a species of tree in the Rose family
