= Thomas Boleyn (priest) =

English priest

The Very Reverend Thomas Boleyn
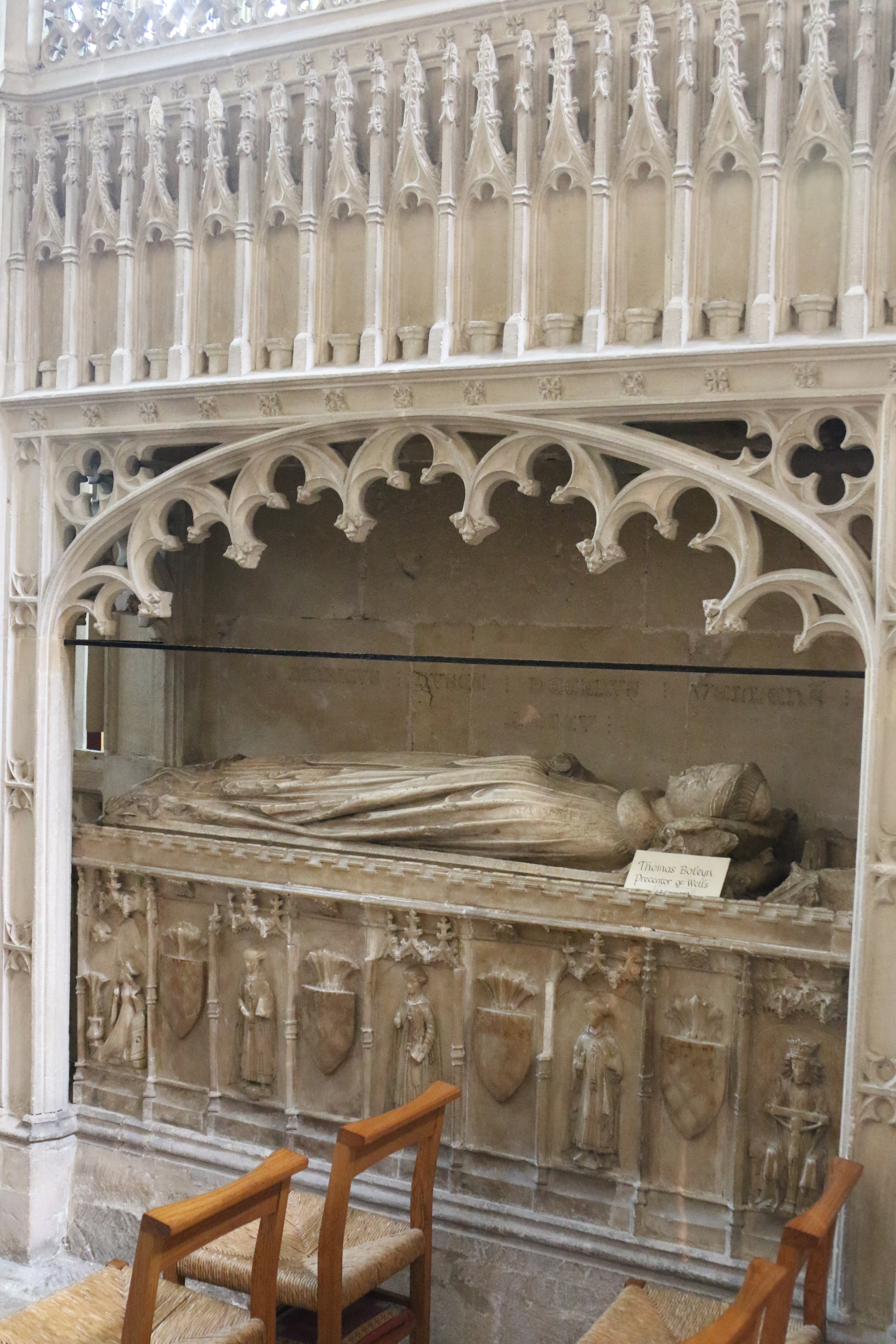
- Tomb in Wells Cathedral

Orders
- Ordination: deacon 8 March 1421, priest later in 1421

Personal details
- Died: 1472
- Buried: Wells Cathedral
- Parents: Geoffrey Boleyn and Alice Bracton

Thomas Boleyn, LL.B (c. 1400-1472), (often Master Thomas Boleyn, clerk; by some now designated Thomas Boleyn II), was the Master of Gonville Hall, Cambridge from 1454 to 1472, the seventh to hold that position. During the later 1440s, through three separate acts of foundation, he was one of the small group appointed to formulate the statutes of what became Queens' College in Cambridge. His brother Sir Geoffrey Boleyn, Lord Mayor of London 1457-58, was the great-grandfather of Anne Boleyn, Queen consort of England.

== Origins ==
Thomas Boleyn was the eldest surviving son of Geoffrey Boleyn (died 1440), yeoman, of Salle, Norfolk, and his wife Alice, daughter and heiress of Sir John Bracton of Norfolk. Geoffrey and Alice Boleyn of Salle are commemorated by a monumental brass in Salle Church, which shows the two figures frontally, standing, set side by side, with a memorial inscription beneath (referring also to their children) and a scroll flying between them with a Latin prayer, "God be merciful to us sinners". Around 1730 Thomas Martin of Palgrave saw two subsidiary brass groups in the slab showing their five sons and their four daughters: these have long been missing. Thomas was the grandson of Thomas Boleyn I (died 1411) of Salle and his wife Agnes.

== Life ==
=== Early career ===
Thomas was ordained as deacon on 8 March 1421, and at the time of his ordination as a priest later in 1421 he was a fellow of Trinity Hall, Cambridge. He then became rector of the church of Reepham, just south-west of Salle, from 1422 to 1429. He is titled Magister in the commission for him to attend the Council of Basle in 1434 upon the King's affairs in the suite of Edmund Beaufort, who presented him to the rectory of Hackford next Reepham in 1436. His degree of Legum Baccalaureus, or "Bachelor of Laws" indicates some grounding in both Civil and Canon Law (mainly for scholarly and philosophical purposes and not as a legal training), presumably in the University of Cambridge, and remained his identifying qualification throughout his career, although he is generally referred to as "Master", and "clerk".

=== Diocese of Chichester ===
In the Chichester bishopric of Richard Praty (1438-1445), Boleyn was presented to various benefices, some of which he may have occupied for administrative purposes. On 9 May 1439 he was present at the bishop's palace at Aldingbourne to witness the resignation of Prior John Baker of Calcetto Priory near Arundel (Pynham Priory, West Sussex). On 23 March 1439, "the venerable and discreet Master Thomas Boleyn LL.B" was present as witness at the profession of Abbot Thomas Shorham of the Premonstratensian Abbey of Begham (Bayham) in the Chichester diocese. In February 1439, for the Commissary in the Archdeaconry of Chichester, he inducted William Daniell as a chaplain at Sefford, and was himself installed as chaplain in East Itchenor (then in the gift of Boxgrove Priory) on 26 June of that year. In June of 1440 Master Thomas Boleyn LL.B and John Langport, Bachelor of Decrees, of the Norwich and Chichester dioceses, were especially summoned and requested to witness the proceedings surrounding the death of the Prior of Tortington Priory and the election of his successor.

On 23 March 1440/41 he was inducted to the rectory of Tolyton. On 17 April 1441 the Bishop of Chichester declared the parish of East Itchenor, then vacant, to be impoverished, having insufficient revenues to maintain it. The Prior and convent of Boxgrove prayed him that it might be united with Bridham, West Sussex, where Richard Swan had been inducted as chaplain on the same 23 March. Boleyn's occupation of East Itchenor and relocation to Tolyton was therefore preparatory to this development.

Boleyn had more direct and enduring responsibilities following Bishop Praty's visitation of Easebourne Priory, a Benedictine nunnery near Midhurst, in January 1441. The prioress, who had led a profligate life, was admonished by the bishop and ordered to submit to the administrative oversight of Master Thomas Boleyn and John Lylis, Esquire. All the temporal goods of the priory were to be committed to them until the priory was free from debt, and the nuns were no longer to be compelled to manual labour. The prioress was to diminish her excessive household and to retain only those deemed absolutely necessary by the advice and assent of Thomas and John: neither was she to have any guests at her table to sojourn there without their assent. Furthermore if Thomas and John deemed it expedient that she should go out on the priory's business, she should not make lengthened stays away or incur any unnecessary expenses, and must content herself with four horses only. Her expensive fur trimmings were to be sold to defray the priory's debts.

It was then on 13 July 1442 that Boleyn was inducted to the rectory of Chelsea (Chelchehethe), in the diocese of London, in the gift of the Abbot and convent of Westminster, which he received from Alexander Brown in exchange for his rectory of Tolyton (belonging to the Prior and convent of Lewes). In this transaction, in the Calendar of Admissions of Bishop Praty, Thomas Boleyn is designated M.A. (Magister in Artibus).

=== London and Westminster ===
From 1441 he was prebendary of Morton Parva in the Cathedral church of Hereford, which in 1446 he exchanged with William Saunders for the prebend of the free chapel of St Stephen's, Westminster (within the Old Palace of Westminster), holding it until his death in 1472. He appears to have been rector of Doddington, Cambridgeshire in 1446, when he exchanged Doddington for Chart Magna in Kent. He had also held the benefice of St Michael Abergele, Denbighshire (a prebendal church annexed to the Archdeaconry of St Asaph), and in 1447 he exchanged this for the London prebend of Portpool, belonging to St Paul's. It appears that in 1451 the prebendary of Portpool created a vacancy by death, but Boleyn himself may have vacated it before this since he received fresh presentations in the Bath and Wells diocese in 1449 (below). It was in 1449/50 that Bishop Reginald Pecock was translated from the see of St Asaph to Chichester.

The statutes of Queens' College, Cambridge

During the later 1440s Boleyn was closely involved with formulating the statutes for the foundation of Queens' College in the University of Cambridge. Henry VI had newly founded King's College, Cambridge when, in 1446, plans for a college consisting of a President and four fellows were set in motion. Land was made over to the King for this purpose in November 1446 and the charter for the first foundation of St Bernard's College, or Hall, was issued on 3 December, naming the founding President, Andrew Dokett, and the fellows, and appointing a committee of six to draw up the statutes for the college's governance. This was headed by John Somerset, Chancellor of the King's Exchequer, and John Langton, Master of Pembroke College, Cambridge 1428-1447 and Chancellor of the University 1436-1443, 1444-1445 and 1447, both of whom had prepared ordinances for King's College before the king dispensed with his advisors in 1443. By the charter of 1446 these six, including Thomas Boleyn, were licensed to formulate, emend or alter completely the statutes by which the President and fellows were to be ruled and governed, then and in the future.

It was then decided that more favourable land for the development of the college lay towards the river and the house of Carmelites in Cambridge, and in August 1447 this additional land was made over and the king revoked the first charter and issued a fresh one. This was in most other respects similar to the first, and the committee for the formulation of ordinances is named several times: of the original six, John Langton and Gilbert Worthington had since died, and were replaced by John Sperhauk and Hugh Damlet (Langton's successor as Master of Pembroke), but Thomas Boleyn remained as before.

In the next months the King's consort, Margaret of Anjou, made a petition that she should become the patroness of the new college, and accordingly the second charter was revoked, and by a third charter of 30 March 1448 St Bernard's Hall was re-founded as "The Queen's College of St Margaret and St Bernard". In this recension the statutes committee had increased to seven, led by William Booth, Bishop of Coventry and Lichfield 1447-1452, John Somerset and Richard Cowedray, with Peter Hirford and Thomas Boleyn also remaining from the original group, Hugh Damlet from the second, and William Millington (founding Provost of King's College, 1441-1447) now introduced. Margaret d'Anjou produced a further charter identifying herself as patroness, but in most respects it is identical to the third. Peter Hirford later became a fellow of Queens' College, and details of the other statute-makers are given by Searle. Both Millington and Damlet were notable opponents of Bishop Pecock's: both Gilbert Worthington and Peter Hirford had espoused the Wycliffite views before renouncing them.

=== Diocese of Bath and Wells ===
It was probably through the advancement of Thomas Beckynton (an associate of John Somerset's) to the Bishopric of Bath and Wells (1443-1465) that Thomas Boleyn became associated with Wells Cathedral. Beckynton, the King's Secretary, had been the administrative architect of Henry's foundation of Eton College, the sister institution to King's College, in 1440. Boleyn was already a canon of Wells in May 1448 when he witnessed the institution of John Rigge to South Cadbury. He was collated by Beckynton to the prebend of Dultyngcote in November 1449 (for which he took his oath of obedience at his hospice in London), and he was appointed to the rectory of Wrington by the Abbot and convent of Glastonbury three months later.

In April 1450 he was collated to the subdeanery of Wells, to which the parish church of Wookey was annexed, and was granted the canonical house vacant by the death of the former subdean, John Reynolds. In May 1451, as president of the Chapter in the absence of the dean, he took part in the presentation of a perpetual chaplain to the chantry of Henry Husee, former dean, at the altar of St Calixtus. Boleyn became Precentor of Wells Cathedral on 25 October 1451, a position vacant by the resignation of John Bernard, to which the church of Pilton, Somerset, was attached. In December 1451 he sought patents to enclose and build upon two plots of land near the cathedral church which were then in profane uses, implementing Beckynton's "New Works". He presented vicars to Pilton in 1461 and 1468, and occupied the office of Precentor until his death in 1472.

=== Master of Gonville Hall ===
It was then in 1454 that he was elected Master of Gonville Hall in Cambridge. This was a natural progression from his former college of Trinity Hall: the two colleges were allied foundations, William Bateman (Bishop of Norwich, died 1355) having founded Trinity Hall in 1350, and also having placed his friend Edmund Gonville's college (of 1348) on a sound footing. Bateman himself had been a distinguished maker of statutes, not least for Bruisyard Abbey (in its gestation at Campsey Priory for Maud of Lancaster) and for Flixton Priory in Suffolk.

Boleyn's election appears to have been contested: William Booth, since 1452 Archbishop of York, gained control of the title to the office, but was much disturbed and opposed by Thomas Boleyn and others. Booth made a complaint to the Pope, who on 31 August 1456 appointed two abbots and a prior to make a decision about the Mastership. They decided in favour of Thomas Boleyn, for he occupied that dignity until his death in 1472. In 1455/56 it is noticed in the registers of the proctors (one of whom was named Henry Boleyn) that Master Robert Calton has paid 12d. for appealing against the election of the Master of Gonville Hall, and that dominus Thomas Boleyn had paid 20d. for having complained of an injury done to him at the same time.

This sustained a former grievance, for Thomas Boleyn and two others had been executors to the will of John Langton (whom Bishop Booth had replaced on the statutes committee), and in 1449 Booth brought a complaint that the executors had failed to fulfil a 100 mark bond owing to him from Langton's estate. Boleyn had answered that they had administered fully, but Booth disputed this. "Magister" Thomas Boleyn, "in legibus bacallarius", also became Master of the College of All Saints, Maidstone in 1458, as his brother Sir Geoffrey completed his term as Lord Mayor of London, and presided there until 1470.

=== Estate ===
In 1460-61 Master Thomas Boleyn, clerk, was associated with Sir Geoffrey as the recipient of a grant at Hever, Kent from Sir William Fiennes, Lord of Say (1428-1471). Geoffrey and Thomas, clerk, also joined in acquiring lands around Horsham at that time, secured to the heirs of the said Thomas. Thomas was executor in the will of Sir Geoffrey Boleyn in 1463, where he is called "my brother Master Thomas Boleyn".

It was in the year of his brother's death that Thomas successfully laid claim to the manor of Hook Hall at Calthorpe, Norfolk, which (as shown in a lawsuit) had been in his family in the time of Edward III, but which in that year was conveyed to him by fine by Richard Dorward and his wife Joan, daughter and coheir of Sir Roger Harsyke. (Hook Hall passed to his nephew Sir William Boleyn, who died seised of it in 1505.) Thomas was prebendary of Sarum from 1465-1472.

His own will has not been found, but his is not to be confused with that of his nephew Thomas Boleyn of London, eldest son of Sir Geoffrey, who died in 1471. The two Thomases acted together as pledges (as "Thomas Boleyn, clericus" and "Thomas Boleyn, Gentilman") in c. 1465-68 when the four daughters and heirs of Lord Hoo and Hastings (including the elder Anna, widow of Sir Geoffrey Boleyn) brought suit against the feoffees of their father's estate. Again in 1469, with Roger Copley (husband of the younger Anna Hoo) and others, they held the manor of Vera Worthy (Pancrasweek) in Devon from the Archbishops of Canterbury and of York, the Earl of Warwick and others (feoffees for Thomas and Anna Ormond alias Butler), to release an annuity of 20 marks to Geoffrey Boleyn's son William Boleyn and his wife Lady Margaret, daughter of Anne Butler.

== Grave and monument ==
To Thomas Boleyn LL.D is attributed a fine tomb with recumbent effigy in St Calixtus's chapel, off the south transept of Wells Cathedral. The monument is especially notable for its alabaster work including figures of canons in choir habits, and images of the Holy Trinity and the Annunciation. These latter presumably allude to his association with the colleges of Trinity Hall and Gonville Hall (The Hall of the Annunciation of the Blessed Virgin Mary). However, although evidently a Bolleyn tomb, this presents the difficulty that the heraldic arms shown on the tomb-chest are Argent, fretty sable, on a chief of the same three plates, for the family of Boleyn or Bullen of Stickford, Lincolnshire, and not Argent, a chevron gules, between three bulls' heads couped sable, which were those of the Norfolk family.

The identification of Thomas the cleric as the rector of Chelsea in 1442 was at first questioned by Venn: but since Bishop Praty's Register specifies that Thomas Boleyn, LL.B., was inducted to Tolyton, and that it was this rectory which was afterwards exchanged for Chelsea, there can be little doubt that the same man was concerned in both preferments.

== Offices Held ==
Academic offices
Preceded by Thomas Attwood	Master of Gonville Hall, Cambridge; 1454–1472	Succeeded by Edmund Sheriffe
