= Mary Scrope =

English courtier (died 1548)

Mary, Lady Kingston
- Died: 25 August 1548
- Noble family: Scrope
- Spouses: Edward Jerningham; Sir William Kingston
- Issue: Sir Henry Jerningham; Ferdinand Jerningham; Edward Jerningham; Edmund Jerningham; Elizabeth Jerningham
- Father: Richard Scrope
- Mother: Eleanor Washbourne

Mary Scrope (died 25 August 1548) was an English courtier. She was the granddaughter of Henry Scrope, 4th Baron Scrope of Bolton, and the sister of Elizabeth Scrope (d. 1537), wife of John de Vere, 13th Earl of Oxford, and Margaret Scrope (d. 1515), wife of Edmund de la Pole, 3rd Duke of Suffolk. She is said to have been in the service at court of King Henry VIII's first four wives. As the wife of Sir William Kingston, Constable of the Tower of London, she was in attendance on Anne Boleyn during the Queen's brief imprisonment in the Tower in May 1536, and both she and her husband were among those who walked with the Queen to the scaffold. By her first husband, Edward Jerningham, she was the mother of Sir Henry Jerningham, whose support helped to place Queen Mary I on the throne of England in 1553, and who became one of Queen Mary's most favoured courtiers.

== Family ==
Mary Scrope was one of the nine daughters of Richard Scrope (d. 1485) of Upsall, Yorkshire, the second son of Henry Scrope, 4th Baron Scrope of Bolton (4 June 1418 – 14 January 1459). Her mother was Eleanor Washbourne (d. 1505/6), the daughter of Norman Washbourne of Wichenford (1433–1482). She was the sister of Elizabeth Scrope (d. 1537), who married firstly William Beaumont, 2nd Viscount Beaumont, and secondly, John de Vere, 13th Earl of Oxford, and of Margaret Scrope (d. 1515), who married Edmund de la Pole, 3rd Duke of Suffolk. She was the niece of John Scrope, 5th Baron Scrope of Bolton.

After the death of Richard Scrope, his widow, Eleanor, married Sir John Wyndham (d. 1502). Wyndham had been knighted on 16 June 1487 at the Battle of Stoke. On 2 May 1502, he was convicted of treason for involvement in the alleged conspiracy of his step-daughter Margaret Scrope's husband, Edmund de la Pole, 3rd Duke of Suffolk, and was beheaded on Tower Hill on 6 May 1502, together with Sir James Tyrrell. In accordance with Richard Scrope's will, Wyndham left three of his step-daughters, Mary, Katherine and Jane Scrope, £1000 to be divided among them for their dowries.

== Career ==
On 11 May 1509, Mary Scrope's first husband, Edward Jerningham, was one of the gentleman ushers at the funeral of King Henry VII, and Mary herself, as 'Mrs. Jernyngham', was among the ladies granted mantlets and kerchiefs for the funeral. On 12 June 'Edward Jernyngham and Mary his wife' were granted a life estate in the manors of Lowestoft and Mutford, which had been forfeited to the Crown by the attainder of Mary's brother-in-law, Edmund de la Pole, 3rd Duke of Suffolk. On 24 June Edward Jerningham was chief cup-bearer at the coronation of Katherine of Aragon, and Mary, listed as 'Mrs. Mary Jernyngham', was among the ladies granted cloth for gowns for the occasion. From 1509 until 1527 Mary is said to have been one of the ladies who served the Queen. In June 1510, Katherine gave her a gown of twany velvet.

Her first husband, Edward Jerningham, died in 1515, and she attended the Field of the Cloth of Gold as a widow. By 1532 she had married Sir William Kingston, who had been appointed Constable of the Tower of London on 28 May 1524, an office which placed him in charge of state prisoners. In May 1536 Anne Boleyn, second wife of King Henry VIII, became Kingston's prisoner. During her brief time in the Tower, Anne was attended by four women who had served either Katherine of Aragon or her daughter, Mary, and who were said to have been chosen by Thomas Cromwell because they were 'unsympathetic' to Anne: Lady Kingston; two of Anne's aunts, Lady Shelton and Lady Boleyn; and Lady Coffin, the wife of her Master of the Horse. Kingston's original instructions from Cromwell were to discourage conversation with Anne. However, according to Ives, Anne herself 'began to babble incriminating material' to her attendants, and in a series of letters Kingston duly informed Cromwell of what Anne had said. These statements were later used as evidence against her at her trial. Kingston described Anne's attendants as "honest and good women", but Anne termed it "a great unkindness in the King to set such about me as I have never loved".

Lady Kingston is said to have been present when Anne Boleyn apologised to Katherine of Aragon's daughter, Mary Tudor, on the night before her execution, and to have delivered the apology to Mary after Anne’s death. The Queen was brought to the place of her trial in the King's Hall in the Tower of London on 15 May 1536 by the Constable and Lieutenant of the Tower, accompanied by Lady Kingston and Lady Boleyn. On 19 May 1536, Sir William Kingston, Lady Kingston, and her three other attendants escorted Anne from her lodgings in the Tower to the scaffold on which she was executed.

After the death of Anne Boleyn, the King married Jane Seymour, and at the christening of their infant son Prince Edward on 15 October 1537, Lady Kingston carried Mary Tudor's train. A few weeks later, on 12 November 1537, she was one of the twenty-nine women who walked in the funeral procession of Jane Seymour.

In 1536, Lady Kingston is said to have played a role in Mary Tudor's reconciliation with her father. From March 1538 until April 1539, Lady Kingston was in charge of a joint household for Henry VIII's daughters, Mary and Elizabeth. A letter from her to Thomas Wriothesley on 3 January 1538 advises of Mary's illness ('My Lady's Grace has been sick ever since Christmas'). After she was replaced as head of Mary's household by Edward and Isabel Baynton, Lady Kingston's continuing relationship with the King's elder daughter is attested to by gifts from her listed in Mary Tudor's privy purse accounts, including gifts of £4 in May 1540 and a gold spoon in January 1544.

In 1539, Lady Kingston was among thirty ladies of the court appointed to serve as "ordinary waiters" to Anne of Cleves. According to some sources, Lady Kingston was in the service of all four of King Henry VIII's first four wives. Lady Kingston was even listed as a member of Henry's last queen consort, Katherine Parr's, household.

She died on 25 August 1548. In her will she requested burial at Painswick with her second husband, Sir William Kingston, but was buried at Low Leyton, Essex, on 4 September 1548.

She had made her will in 1546. Among many other bequests, she left a goblet of silver and gilt and a ruby ring to her step-daughter, Lady Anne Grey, and a bed of crimson velvet to her granddaughter, Mary Jerningham. She gave her sister Jane Brews a gold hoop jewel engraved with the five wounds of Christ and a book, and her to her nephew John a brooch with an image of Mary Magdalen.

Strype records the following verses commemorating her on a brass plate dating from 1557 on the south wall of the old chancel of the Church of St Mary at Low Leyton:

If you will the truth have,
Here lieth in this grave,
Directly under this stone,
Good Lady Mary Kingston,
Who departed this life, the truth to say,
In the month of August, the twenty-fifth day,
And as I do well remember,
Was buried honourably the fourth day of September
The year of Our Lord reckoned truly
MVc forty and eight verily,
Whose yearly obit and anniversary
Is determined to be kept surely
At the cost of her son, Sir Henry Jerningham, truly,
Who was at this making
Of the Queen’s Guard chief captain.

== Marriages and issue ==
Mary Scrope married firstly, about 1509, as his second wife, Edward Jerningham (d. 6 January 1515) of Somerleyton, Suffolk, the son of Sir John Jerningham (d. 1503) and Isabel Clifton, the daughter of Sir Gervase Clifton (d. 1471) and Isabel Herbert. Jerningham's first wife was Margaret Bedingfield (d. 24 March 1504), by whom he had six sons and two daughters, Mary Scrope's stepchildren:

- Sir John Jerningham (d. 1559?) of Somerleyton, who married Bridget Drury (d. 19 January 1518), the daughter of Sir Robert Drury of Hawstead, Suffolk, by whom he had three sons, George (d. 1559), Robert and John, and two daughters, Anne Jerningham, who married Sir Thomas Cornwallis, and Elizabeth Jerningham, who married John Sulyard of Wetherden, Suffolk. Bridget Drury's name appears on the fly-leaf of the Ellesmere manuscript of The Canterbury Tales now in the Huntington Library, together with the names of four of her brothers and sisters: "William Drury, miles, Robertus Drury, miles, Domina [Anne] Jarmin, Domina [Bridget] Jarningham, and Domina [Ursula] Allington."
- Thomas Jerningham.
- Robert Jerningham (d. 25 April 1528), 'much famed for his valour', who died at the siege of Naples without issue.
- Nicholas Jerningham.
- Henry Jerningham.
- Fernand Jerningham.
- Margaret Jerningham (d. 1559), who married firstly George Blennerhasset, and secondly, Robert Holdich.
- Anne Jerningham (d. 1559), who married firstly Lord Edward Grey (d. before 1517), eldest son of Thomas Grey, 1st Marquess of Dorset; secondly Henry Barlee (1487 – November 12, 1529) of Albury, Hertfordshire; thirdly Sir Robert Drury (d. 1 March 1535/6) of Hawstead, Suffolk; and fourthly Sir Edmund Walsingham (d. 10 February 1550) of Chislehurst, Kent.

By Edward Jerningham, Mary Scrope is said to have had four sons and a daughter:

- Sir Henry Jerningham of Costessey Hall, who married Frances Baynham, the daughter of Sir George Baynham (d. 6 May 1546) of Clearwell, Gloucestershire, by whom he had three sons, Henry, William and Francis, and two daughters, Mary, who married Sir Thomas Southwell (d. 1568) of Woodrising, Norfolk, and Jeronyma, who married Charles Waldegrave.
- Ferdinand Jerningham.
- Edward Jerningham, born after the death of his father.
- Edmund Jerningham (d. 9 February 1546), whose wardship was granted to his mother's second husband, Sir William Kingston. He was a Gentleman of the Bedchamber to King Henry VIII.
- Elizabeth Jerningham, Maid of Honour to Queen Mary I.

She married secondly, by 1532, as his third wife, Sir William Kingston (c. 1476 – 14 September 1540), Constable of the Tower of London, by whom she had no issue. Kingston had earlier been twice married, to a wife named Elizabeth whose surname is unknown, and to Anne (née Berkeley), the widow of Sir John Gyse or Guise (d. 30 September 1501), and daughter of Sir William Berkeley (d. 1501) of Weoley (in Northfield), Worcestershire, by Anne Stafford, daughter of Sir Humphrey Stafford of Grafton, Worcestershire, slain by Jack Cade 7 June 1450. By his first two wives Kingston had a son and daughter:

- Bridget Kingston, who married Sir George Baynham (d. 6 May 1546) of Clearwell, Gloucestershire, son and heir of Sir Christopher Baynham (d. 6 October 1557). After the death of Bridget (née Kingston), George Baynham married Cecilia Gage, the daughter of Sir John Gage (1479–1556) of Firle.
- Sir Anthony Kingston (d. 1556), who married firstly, before October 1524, Dorothy Harpur, the daughter of Robert Harpur, and secondly, by 1537, Mary Gainsford, widow of Sir William Courtenay (d. 1535) of Powderham, and daughter of Sir John Gainsford of Crowhurst, Surrey. He had no issue by either marriage, but by a mistress had two illegitimate sons, Anthony and Edmund.
