= William Boleyn =

English landowner (1451–1505)

Sir William Boleyn
- Born: 1451; Blickling, Norfolk, England
- Died: 10 October 1505 (aged 53–54)
- Spouse: Margaret Butler
- Children: Anne, Lady Shelton; Thomas Boleyn, 1st Earl of Wiltshire; John Boleyn; Anthony Boleyn; Amy, Lady Calthorpe; Alice, Lady Clere; Gervase Sachville; Margaret Sachville William Boleyn archdeacon of Winchester 1530–1552; Sir James Boleyn; Sir Edward Boleyn
- Parent(s): Sir Geoffrey Boleyn; Anne Hoo
- Relatives: Queen (Consort) Anne Boleyn (granddaughter); Queen Elizabeth I of England (great-granddaughter)

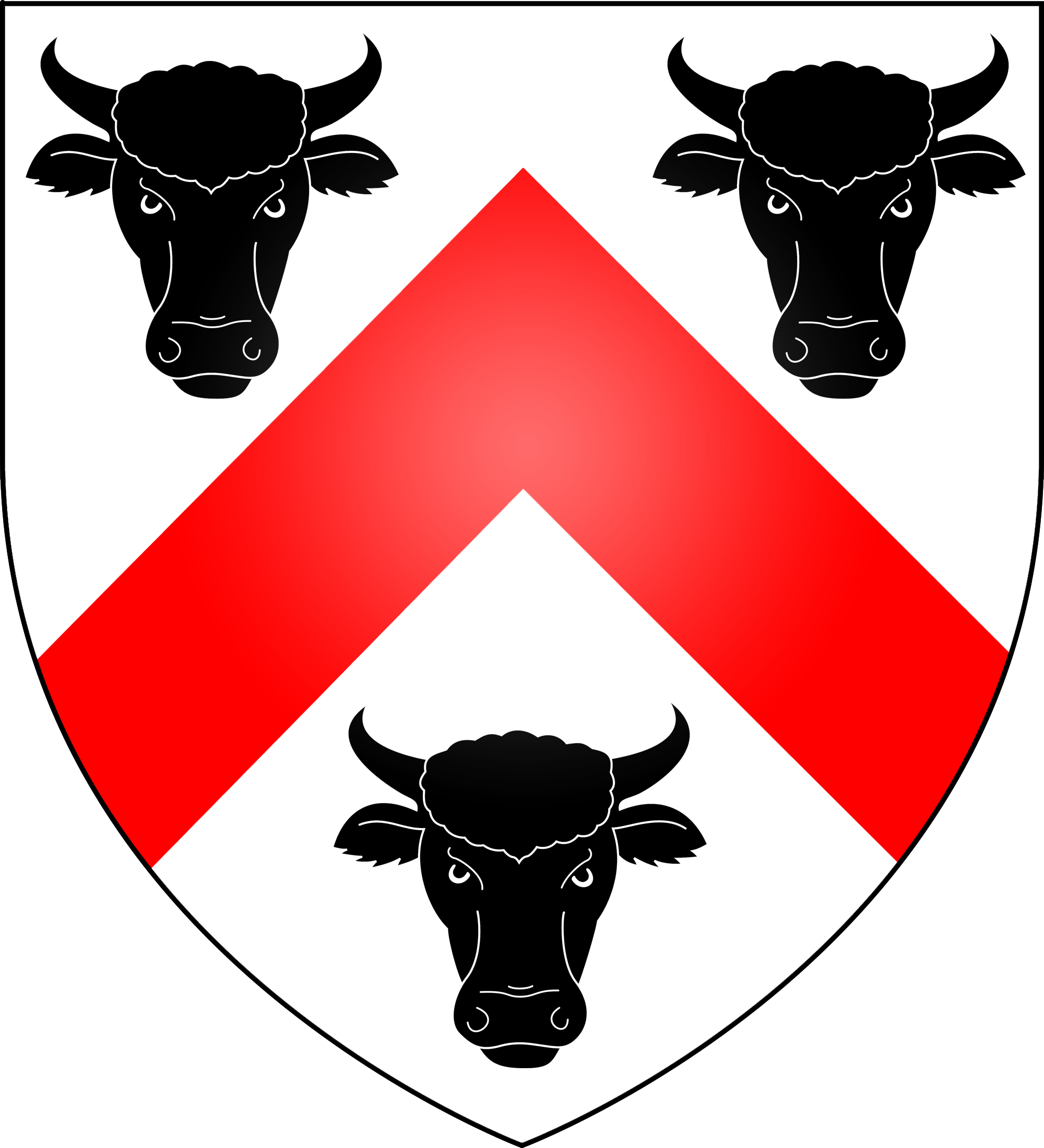
Boleyn coat of arms

Sir William Boleyn, KB (1451 – 10 October 1505) of Blickling Hall in Norfolk and Hever Castle in Kent, was a wealthy and powerful landowner who served as Sheriff of Kent in 1489 and as Sheriff of Norfolk and Suffolk in 1500. He was the father of Thomas Boleyn, 1st Earl of Wiltshire, whose daughter was Queen Anne Boleyn, the second wife of King Henry VIII.

== Origins ==
William Boleyn was born at Blickling Hall in Norfolk, the younger of the two sons of Sir Geoffrey Boleyn (1406–1463), a wealthy member of the Worshipful Company of Mercers who purchased the Blickling estate in 1452 and served as Lord Mayor of London in 1457–58. William's mother was Anne Hoo (c.1424–1484), the eldest child of Thomas Hoo, Baron Hoo and Hastings of Luton Hoo in Hertfordshire, and his only child by his first wife Elizabeth Wychingham, a daughter of Sir Nicholas Wychingham of Norfolk.

== Fraternal inheritance ==
William's father died in 1463 when his estates were inherited by William's elder brother Thomas Boleyn, Esquire, of the City of London, of whom William became the heir apparent. Thomas died in 1471 and asked in his will to be buried beside his father in the Church of St Lawrence, Old Jewry in City of London, where their monumental inscriptions were recorded by John Weever in 1631. Thomas appointed his mother as his executor, instructing her to sell his manor of Ingham, Norfolk. William eventually succeeded to Blickling, Hever Castle, and other estates formerly held by his brother.

== Hoo inheritance ==
In the mid-1440s Sir Thomas Hoo received the lordship of Hastings, the Garter, and his baronial title, and made his second marriage. He then secured his various manors to his own heirs and those of his younger half-brother, Thomas Hoo Esquire. Lord Hoo and Hastings died in 1455: his brother settled the manor and advowson of Mulbarton, Norfolk on Anne Hoo and her husband Geoffrey Boleyn, and when Anne died a widow in 1484 they descended to her son Sir William Boleyn, who presented to the joint rectory of Mulbarton-cum-Keningham in 1494, 1497 and 1500. In 1487, on the death of Thomas Hoo, Esq., without issue, then by a feoffment made in 1473 (and not as heir general) William Boleyn became seised of the manor of Offeley St Leger in Offeley and Cokernhoe, Hertfordshire, and others in Sussex.

== Career ==
He was admitted to the Mercers' Company in 1472, and (by special admission) to Lincoln's Inn in 1473. He was created a Knight of the Bath at the Coronation of Richard III in 1483. In August 1483 John Howard, 1st Duke of Norfolk, Lord High Admiral, constituted Sir William his deputy for all the coasts of Norfolk and Suffolk, for life. He was charged by King Henry VII with responsibility for the beacons which were used to warn in the event of an attack on English shores. As a member of the Kent gentry, owing to his seat at Hever Castle, he served as Sheriff of Kent in 1489 and owing to his Norfolk seat at Blickling, as Sheriff of Norfolk and Suffolk in 1500.

== Marriage and issue ==
Before November 1469, William Boleyn married Margaret Butler (d. 1539/1540), the second daughter and co-heiress of Thomas Butler, 7th Earl of Ormond (d. 1515) by his first wife Anne Hankford. As part of her marriage settlement she brought the manor of Aylesbury in Buckinghamshire to her husband. By his wife he had six sons and four daughters:

- Anne Boleyn (18 November 1475 – 31 October 1479) who died in infancy "aged 3 years, 11 months and 13 days", and was buried in Blickling Church where survives her monumental brass, which shows her as a mature woman;
- Amy or Amata or Ann (sometimes called Jane) Boleyn (c. 1475 – died after 1521) who married Sir Phillip Calthorpe (died c. 1552) of Erwarton in Suffolk;
- Thomas Boleyn, 1st Earl of Wiltshire (c. 1477 – 12 March 1538/9), eldest son and heir, who married Elizabeth Howard, a daughter of Thomas Howard, 2nd Duke of Norfolk by his first wife, Elizabeth Tilney. His second daughter was Queen Anne Boleyn (c.1501/5–1536), the second wife of King Henry VIII;
- John Boleyn (died 1484), buried at Blickling, predeceased his father;
- Anthony Boleyn (died 30 September 1493), buried at Blickling, predeceased his father;
- Alice Boleyn (c. 1478 – 1 November 1538) who married Sir Robert Clere (died 10 August 1529) of Ormesby St Michael and Ormesby St St Margaret, Norfolk. Her monumental brass survives in Ormesby St Margaret Church.
- Margaret Boleyn (born about 1479) who married John Sackville (c.1484–1557), of Mount Bures in Essex, a Member of Parliament;
- William Boleyn (c. 1481 – 1551/52), Archdeacon of Winchester 1529/30–1551. His inventory and records of the church of St Peter, Westcheap, of which he was rector 1517–1529, are informative.
- Anne Boleyn (c. 1483 – 6 January 1555) who married Sir John Shelton of Shelton in Norfolk. Their kneeling effigies as donor figures, with coats of arms, survive in the lower part of the east window of Shelton Church.
- Sir James Boleyn (c. 1485 – 5 December 1561) who married Elizabeth Wood of East Barsham, Norfolk. "He was buried with great pomp at Blickling."
- Sir Edward Boleyn (born about 1486) who married Anne Tempest, a daughter of Sir John Tempest. (Sir John's mother Catharine Welles was the sister of Eleanor, the second wife of Lord Hoo and Hastings.)

== Inheritance from marriage ==
In 1491 Thomas Butler, 7th Earl of Ormond, William's father-in-law, received royal licence to empark, licence to crenellate and machicolate, and to build walls and towers of brick at his manor of New Hall at Boreham and Little Waltham in Essex. Through Margaret Butler, wife of William Boleyn, this came to the Boleyn family. New Hall was sold in 1516 by Sir Thomas Boleyn (Sir William's son) to King Henry VIII, who rebuilt the mansion in brick as the Palace of Beaulieu. Margaret Butler died around March 1539/40: from 1519 onwards she was declared by inquisition to have suffered periods of insanity making her incapable of managing her own estates.

== Death and burial ==
He died on 10 October 1505 and in his will, proved later that year, he requested to be buried in Norwich Cathedral beside the grave of his mother Ann Hoo, and bequeathed his various manors in Norfolk, Bedfordshire, Hertfordshire and Kent. Sir William was a considerable benefactor to the fabric of Norwich Cathedral, in adorning the arches in the choir, where his arms were displayed in various places. His arms also appear in St Gregory's church, Norwich, and his house was adjacent to that of Sir Miles Stapleton. His ledger stone in the Cathedral when seen by Blomefield in 1743 was on the south side on the presbytery steps, and had been despoiled of its monumental brasses. It bore the inscription Hic jacet Corpus Willelmi Boleyn Militis, qui obiit X Octobris Anno D(omi)ni: M^{o}CCCCC^{o}v^{o}, Cuius anime propicietur Deus Amen ("Here lies the body of William Boleyn, Knight, who died on the 10th of October in the year of our Lord the 1505th upon whose soul may God look with favour Amen"). The heraldry displayed on this stone was as follows:

- 1) (Boleyn single): argent a chevron gules between 3 bulls' heads sable armed or.
- 2) (Boleyn quartering): (a) (Bracton) three mullets 2 and 1, a chief indented ermine; (b) (Butler earl of Ormond) or a chief indented azure, impaling (Hoo) quarterly argent and sable, quartering (St. Omer) azure a fess between 6 croslets or, and a shield of pretence, in fess of (Wichingham) ermine on a chief sable 3 croslets pâté or.
- 3) (Bracton single) three mullets 2 and 1, a chief indented ermine.

== Family Tree ==
Boleyn family tree

John Boleyn I (relationship to Nicholas unclear)
Nicholas Boleyn
John Boleyn II (c. 1300 – c. 1369)	Emma
Sir John Bracton	Thomas Boleyn I (c. 1350–1411); Builder of St Peter and St Paul's, Salle	Agnes
Alice Bracton (c. 1390–?)	Geoffrey Boleyn I (c. 1380–1440); Yeoman of Salle, Norfolk	Sir Thomas Hoo (c. 1396–1455); Baron Hoo and Hastings
William Boleyn (d. 1481)	John Boleyn	The Very Rev Thomas Boleyn II (c. 1405–1472); Master of Gonville Hall, Cambridge	Sir Geoffrey Boleyn II (1406–1463); Lord Mayor of London	Anne Hoo (c. 1424–1482)	Thomas Butler; Earl of Ormond (1426–1515)
Thomas Howard (1443–1524); Duke of Norfolk	Sir Thomas Boleyn III (c. 1442–1471); Lord of Blickling Hall	Sir William Boleyn II (1451–1505); Sheriff of Kent, Norfolk and Suffolk	Lady Margaret Butler (c. 1454–1539)
Elizabeth Howard (c. 1480–1538)	Sir Thomas Boleyn (c. 1477–1539); 1st Earl of Wiltshire and Ormand	William Boleyn (1491–1571)	Sir James Boleyn (1493–1561)	Sir Edward Boleyn (c. 1496–?)
George Boleyn; Viscount Rochford (1503/4–1536)	Mary Boleyn (c. 1499–1543)	Anne Boleyn (c. 1501–1536); Queen Consort	Henry VIII (1491–1547); King of England
Elizabeth I (1533–1603); Queen of England
