= Bollin (surname) =

Bollin is a surname. Notable people with the surname include:

- Ann Bollin (born 1960), American politician
- Zuzu Bollin (1923–1990), American blues guitarist

== See also ==
- Boleyn
