= Anne Hankford =

English noble

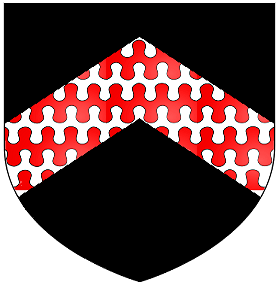
- Arms of Hankford
- Born: c. 1431; Norfolk
- Died: 13 November 1485 (aged 53–54); Kilkenny
- Noble family: Hankford (by birth); Butler (by marriage)
- Spouse: Thomas Butler, 7th Earl of Ormond
- Issue: Anne Butler; Margaret Butler
- Father: Sir Richard Hankford
- Mother: Anne Montagu

Lady Anne Butler, Countess of Ormond (c. 1431 – 13 November 1485) was the first wife of Thomas Butler, 7th Earl of Ormond (c. 1426- 3 August 1515). She was the great-grandmother of Anne Boleyn.

== Early life and family ==
She was a daughter and co-heiress of Sir Richard Hankford of Annery, Monkleigh, Devon, feudal baron of Bampton by his second wife Anne Montagu, a daughter of John Montagu, 3rd Earl of Salisbury.

== Marriage and issue ==
She married Thomas Butler, 7th Earl of Ormond before 1450. He was the youngest son of James Butler, 4th Earl of Ormond and Joan de Beauchamp. They had two daughters:

- Margaret Butler (c.1454 – 1539) married Sir William Boleyn, by whom she had issue, including Thomas Boleyn, 1st Earl of Wiltshire, the father of Anne Boleyn, Mary Boleyn, and George Boleyn, by his wife Elizabeth Howard.
- Anne Butler (born c. 1455) who married Sir James St. Leger.

== Death ==
Anne died on 13 November 1485, in the same month of the restoration of the estates and title of Ormonde to her husband by King Henry VII's first Parliament. Thomas Butler and his brothers had been declared traitors by King Edward IV, who had had statutes made against them at Westminster. After her death, Thomas Butler married Lora Berkeley, daughter of Sir Edward Berkeley, by whom he had a daughter who died young. In 1509, he was appointed Queen Catherine of Aragon's first Lord Chamberlain.
