= Elizabeth Boleyn (lady-in-waiting) =

English noble

Elizabeth, Lady Boleyn (née Wood; fl. 15 May 1536) was a lady-in-waiting at the court of Henry VIII of England. Through her marriage to Sir James Boleyn, she was the aunt of Henry VIII's second wife, Anne Boleyn. The two were not close, and Elizabeth Boleyn acted as her niece's gaoler when Queen Anne was arrested on charges of adultery, incest and conspiracy to kill the King.

== Family background ==
Her father was Roger Wood or Roger a Woode. The Wood family estates included East Barsham and Terrington in Norfolk. Elizabeth's sister (or aunt), Anne Wood, married Thomas Astley (died 1543) of Melton Constable. Her son, John Astley (died 1596) was Master of the Jewel Office. Anne Astley died at Blickling Hall in 1512. Elizabeth's sister, Alice Wood, married Michael Makerith or Makerel, an embroiderer, and Dorothy Wood married a William Whayte. Roger Wood, by his will of 1518, bequeathed his estates to his brother-in-law William Fermor and his father Henry Fermor, who built East Barsham Manor.

== Career at court ==
Elizabeth Boleyn was one of the many relatives who benefitted from the success of her brother-in-law, Sir Thomas Boleyn, who was a successful ambassador and rose to the title Viscount Rochford in 1525. After Henry fell in love with Thomas' daughter, Anne, Thomas Boleyn was given the earldoms of Wiltshire and Ormonde.

Despite this, there seems to have been long-running animosity between Elizabeth Boleyn and her niece. In 1536 five women were appointed to serve Queen Anne while she was imprisoned in the Tower and to report to Sir William Kingston, the Lieutenant of the Tower, and through him to the King's chief minister, Thomas Cromwell, all that the Queen said. These women included Elizabeth Boleyn; Queen Anne's aunt, Anne Shelton; Mary Kingston, the wife of Sir William Kingston, the Lieutenant of the Tower; Margaret Coffin, the wife of Queen Anne's Master of the Horse; and Elizabeth Stoner, wife of the King's Serjeant-at-Arms. Sir William Kingston described the five as "honest and good women", but Queen Anne said that it was "a great unkindness in the King to set such about me as I have never loved".

It was Elizabeth Boleyn and Mary Kingston who accompanied Queen Anne to her trial on 15 May 1536.
