= James Boleyn =

British courtier

Sir James Boleyn
- Died: 1561
- Occupation: Courtier
- Spouse: Elizabeth Wood
- Parent(s): Sir William Boleyn; Margaret Butler
- Relatives: Thomas Boleyn, 1st Earl of Wiltshire (brother); Anne Boleyn (niece); Elizabeth I (grand-niece)

Sir James Boleyn (died 1561) was an English courtier in the reign of Henry VIII and chancellor of the household of his niece, Anne Boleyn, the second wife of Henry VIII. He was thus the grand-uncle of Elizabeth I. James was the son of Sir William Boleyn and his wife, Margaret Butler. His eldest brother was Thomas Boleyn, 1st Earl of Wiltshire.

== Career ==
He was knighted in 1520 for reasons unknown. In 1529, he sat for Norfolk in the Reformation parliament. He was a Knight of the Body by 1533. This position did not involve regular attendance at court and was "largely honorific".

James married Elizabeth Wood, who was one of the principal witnesses against their niece, Anne Boleyn, when she was arrested for adultery, incest and conspiring to kill the king. James is described as someone who shared Anne Boleyn's reformist beliefs. He and the king debated scripture with Hugh Latimer.

In 1539 he was an attendant of the Duke of Norfolk at the reception of Anne of Cleves.

Sir James Boleyn died in 1561. His nephew, Edward Clere inherited his manor of Blicking.

== Sources ==
- Retha M. Warnicke, 1989, The Rise and Fall of Anne Boleyn, (Cambridge: Cambridge University Press, 1989), p. 157
