= Amy Boleyn =

English noblewoman and courtier (died 1543)

Amata "Amy" Boleyn, Lady Calthorpe (cirka 1485–1543) often called Amy Boleyn, and sometimes incorrectly called Jane Boleyn, was an English noblewoman and courtier. She was the paternal aunt of queen Anne Boleyn and the royal governess of the future Queen Mary I between 1521 and 1525.

== Biography ==
Amy Boleyn was born to Sir William Boleyn and Lady Margaret Butler. She was the sister of Thomas Boleyn and the paternal aunt of queen Anne Boleyn. She married Sir Philip Calthorpe, and became the mother of Elizabeth Calthorpe.

In October 1521 she was appointed to replace Margaret Pole as Lady Mistress or Governess to Princess Mary. In parallel, her husband was appointed chamberlain to the Household of Mary. When Mary was settled in Ludlow Castle in Wales, Margaret Pole was reinstated as her governess, but Amy Boleyn remained in Mary's household and accompanied her to Ludlow as "gentlewoman" (Lady-in-waiting), while her husband remained as vice-chamberlain. Mary's personal household was abolished in 1531.

Amy Boleyn was widowed in 1535. She is last noted when she gifted a New Year's gift to her former charge Princess Mary on New Year's Eve of 1543–1544.

Amy Boleyn has often been referred to as "Jane Boleyn" due to confusion with the wife of her stepson, who was a Jane married to another Sir Philip Calthorpe; as well as with the wife of her nephew, the famous Jane Boleyn.
