= George Boleyn (priest) =

English priest

George Boleyn, dean of Lichfield (died around 1603) was a colourful character at the court of his kinswoman, Elizabeth I of England.

== Early life ==
Not much is known of his early life, but one theory suggests that he was the son of George Boleyn and his wife Jane Parker and thus Elizabeth I's first cousin. However, another theory states that he could not have been their son, as there was no record of children, and was more likely to have been a distant cousin and relative of queen consort Anne Boleyn. Whatever his background, he managed to survive the downfall of Anne Boleyn and her family.

== Education ==
He entered Trinity Hall, Cambridge, in the position of a sizar, November 1544. At Cambridge, Boleyn was a pupil of John Whitgift, afterwards archbishop of Canterbury. In 1552, he graduated B.A. and in 1560 commenced master of arts.

== Priestly ministry ==
On 3 August 1560, he was installed prebendary of Ulleskelf in the church of York; afterwards he became rector of Kempston in Nottinghamshire, and prebendary of the church of Chichester; on 21 December 1566, he was preferred to a canonry of the church of Canterbury, and in the following year graduated B.D.

At the proceedings of the metropolitical visitation of the church of Canterbury in September 1573, various charges were laid against Boleyn. It was alleged that he had threatened to nail the dean to the wall; that he had struck one of the canons, William Eling, a blow on the ear; had attempted to strike another canon Dr. Rush; had struck a canon in the chapter-house, and had thrashed a lawyer. It must be granted that Boleyn was of a hasty temper; indeed he frankly admitted that he was accustomed to swear when provoked. But he did not long trouble the peace of the resident canons. On the last day of February 1574-6 he was presented by the dean and chapter of Canterbury to the rectory of St. Dionis Backchurch, London; and on 22 December 1576 he was installed dean of Lichfield, having taken the degree of D.D., as a member of Trinity College, earlier in the same year.

He was made prebendary of Dasset Parva on 16 November 1577, but resigned that post in or about February 1578-9. In 1582, he became involved in a lengthy and serious dispute with John Aylmer, the bishop of his diocese. It appears that the bishop, 'being necessitous on his coming into the diocese, laboured all he could to supply himself from his clergy' (Stype's Whitgift, i. 201, ed. 1822). Boleyn, a man 'prudent and stout,' strenuously resisted the aggressive action of the bishop, finally making his appeal to the lords of the privy council, who appointed the archbishop of Canterbury to institute a visitation. In or about August 1592, Boleyn resigned the rectory of St. Dionis Backchurch, and in 1595, after much opposition, was appointed to the rectory of Bangor.

He died in January 1602-3, and was buried in Lichfield Cathedral, where there is a monument to him.
