= Richard Hankford =

English landowner and soldier

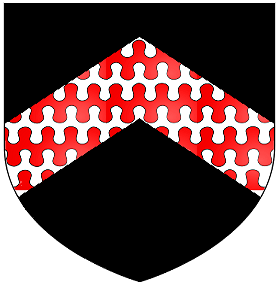
Arms of Hankford of Annery

Sir Richard Hankford (1397–1431) was an English landowner and soldier from Devon.

== Origins ==
Born about 21 July 1397, he was the son of Richard Hankford (died 1419), MP for Devon in 1414 and 1416, and his wife Thomasine Stapledon (died before 1419), daughter and sole heiress of Sir Richard Stapledion, of Norton Fitzwarren and Nonnington in Somerset.

== Career ==
After the death of his father in 1419, he inherited his late mother's lands and in 1420 the lands brought to him by his wife, followed in 1424 by the lands of his paternal grandfather, Sir William Hankford (died 1423) KB, of Annery in Devon, Chief Justice of the King's Bench. Further landholdings came in 1425, when he and his wife inherited the estates of her grandmother Elizabeth Cogan (died 1397) that had been held by her widower Sir Hugh Courtenay. He served with the English forces in France during the Hundred Years' War in the retinue of his brother-in-law Thomas Montacute, 4th Earl of Salisbury and was knighted at St Albans between 8 July and 6 October 1429. He died on 8 February 1431 aged 33, holding properties in Berkshire, Cornwall, Devon, Gloucestershire, Herefordshire, London (where he and his wife owned four retail shops in Holborn), Middlesex, Oxfordshire, Shropshire, Somerset; Staffordshire, Wiltshire and Yorkshire.

== Family ==
At some time before 1420 he married Elizabeth FitzWarin (died before 16 January 1428), daughter of Fulk FitzWarin, 6th Baron FitzWarin (1389–1407) and sole heiress of her brother Fulk FitzWarin, 7th Baron FitzWarin (1406–1420). They had three daughters:

- Thomasine Hankford (1423–1453), who inherited extensive lands from her mother and in 1437 married William Bourchier, 9th Baron FitzWarin (1407–1469).
- Elizabeth Hankford (1424–1433), who died unmarried.
- Joan Hankford, who died young before her father.

Elizabeth had died by 16 January 1428 and he then married Anne Montagu (died 1457), daughter of the executed John Montagu, 3rd Earl of Salisbury and sister of his patron, the 4th Earl. They had one daughter:

- Anne Hankford (died 1485), who inherited Annery from her father. About 1445 she married Thomas Butler, 7th Earl of Ormond (died 1515).

His widow Anne married again to Sir Lewis John (died 1442) and then to John Holland, 2nd Duke of Exeter (died 1447). She was buried with her third husband in the church of St Katharine by the Tower in the City of London.
