= Lady Margaret Butler =

Irish noblewoman

- Born: c. 1454; Kilkenny Castle, County Kilkenny, Ireland
- Died: c. 1539 (aged 84–85); England
- Noble family: Butler
- Spouse: Sir William Boleyn
- Issue: Anne Boleyn; Thomas Boleyn, 1st Earl of Wiltshire; John Boleyn; Anthony Boleyn; Amy Boleyn; Alice Boleyn; Margaret Boleyn; William Boleyn; James Boleyn; Edward Boleyn
- Father: Thomas Butler, 7th Earl of Ormond
- Mother: Anne Hankford

Arms of Butler, Earl of Ormond: Gules, three covered cups or

Lady Margaret Boleyn (c.1454 – 1539) was an Irish noblewoman, the daughter and co-heiress of Thomas Butler, 7th Earl of Ormond. She married Sir William Boleyn and through her eldest son Sir Thomas Boleyn, was the paternal grandmother of Anne Boleyn, second wife of King Henry VIII of England, and great-grandmother of Anne and Henry's daughter, Elizabeth I.

== Life ==
She was born at Kilkenny Castle in County Kilkenny, Ireland, the daughter and co-heiress of Thomas Butler, 7th Earl of Ormond and Anne Hankford. Her paternal grandparents were James Butler, 4th Earl of Ormond and Joan de Beauchamp. Her maternal grandparents were Sir Richard Hankford (c. 1397 – 1431) and Anne de Montagu.

She had two sisters: Anne who married Sir James de St Leger, by whom she had issue, and Elizabeth. Anne and Margaret claimed to be co-heiresses of their father and the Earldom of Ormond, but their cousin, Piers Butler, who had physical control of the Irish estates and the backing of the Irish Council, claimed to be the heir through the direct male line. In 1520, the King granted her a pardon for the alienation of Fritwell Manor, Oxfordshire. The issue wasn't resolved until 1528, by which time Margaret's position was good, with the influence of her granddaughter, then betrothed to Henry VIII, and Margaret's son, Thomas Boleyn's, status as King's adviser.

Margaret married before November 1469 William Boleyn, with whom she had ten children. Her son, the ambitious courtier Thomas Boleyn, became the first Earl of Wiltshire and by his marriage to Elizabeth Howard, the daughter of the Earl of Surrey, the future Duke of Norfolk, he was the father to Anne Boleyn, Queen Consort of England. Thus, Margaret was great-grandmother to Queen Elizabeth I.

From around 1519 onward, she was declared by inquisition to have suffered periods of insanity making her incapable of managing her own estates.

She was the last of the Boleyns to live in Hever Castle as it was given to Anne of Cleves in 1540, after Margaret's death. Her lands were claimed by the only surviving child of her son Thomas, Mary Boleyn, and her husband, William Stafford.

== Issue ==
Name	Birth	Death	Notes
Anne Boleyn	18 November 1475	31 October 1479	"aged 3 years, 11 months and 13 days", buried with a monumental brass at Blickling.
Thomas, 1st Earl of Wiltshire and Ormonde	c. 1477	12 March 1539	married Elizabeth Howard; had issue, including Queen Anne Boleyn
John	1481	1484	
Anne	c.1483	6 January 1556	married John Shelton; had issue
Anthony	1483	30 September 1493	
Jane (Amata, Amy or Ann)	c. 1485	unknown	married Sir Philip Calthorpe, had daughter Elizabeth Calthorpe.
Alice	c. 1487	1538	married Robert Clere
Margaret	c. 1489	1556	married John Sackville; had issue.
William	c. 1491	18 December 1571	Married Ellen Venables
James	c. 1493	5 December 1561	married Elizabeth Wood
Edward	c. 1496	unknown	married Anne Tempest

== Fictional portrayals ==
Margaret Butler as Grandmother Boleyn appears in the 2002 Philippa Gregory novel The Other Boleyn Girl. She is portrayed as a critical and insubordinate woman who is shrewd and uncaring toward her grandchildren and great-grandchildren. She does seem to inquire about life in the English court. Margaret lived in the Boleyn estate in Hever Castle, and plays a supporting role in the novel.

== See also ==
- Butler dynasty
