= Bollen (surname) =

Bollen is a surname. Notable people with the surname include:

- Christopher Bollen (born 1975), American writer
- Clemens Bollen (born 1948), German politician
- George Bollen (1826–1892), homeopathic doctor in South Australia
- Johan Bollen (born 1971), Belgian scientist
- Kenneth A. Bollen (born 1951), American sociologist
