= Blickling Hall =

17th-century stately home in Norfolk, England

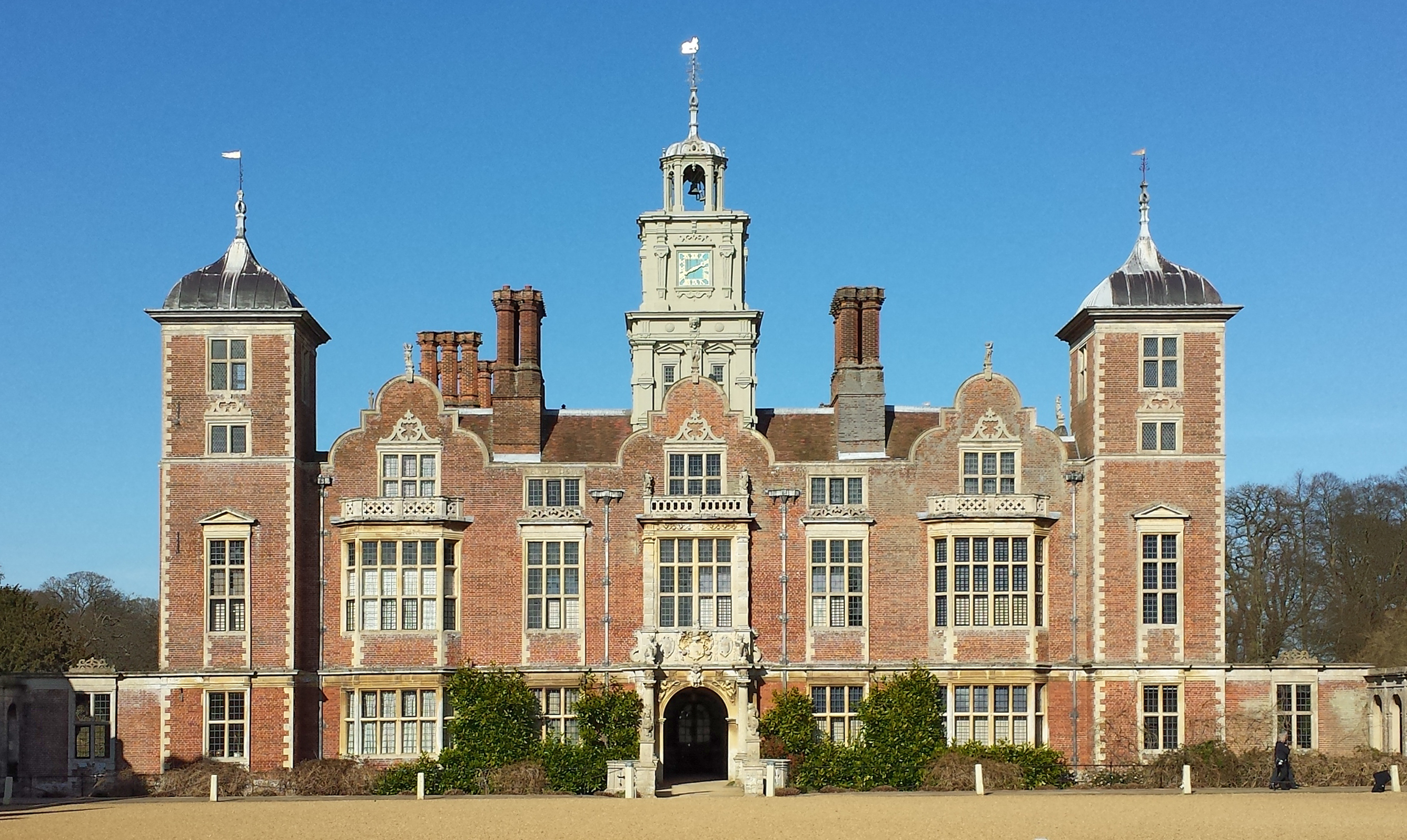

- Location within Norfolk
- 52.8118°N 1.2318°E
- Type: Country house
- Location: Blickling, Norfolk, England

History
- Built: c. 1619–27
- Built for: Sir Henry Hobart, 1st Baronet

Site notes
- Architect: Robert Lyminge
- Architectural style: Jacobean
- Owner: National Trust
- Website: nationaltrust.org.uk/blickling

Listed Building – Grade I
- Official name: Blickling Hall
- Designated: 19 January 1952
- Reference no.: 1051428

Blickling Hall is a Grade I listed English country house situated in 5,000 acres (2,000 ha) of parkland in a loop of the River Bure, near the village of Blickling north of Aylsham in Norfolk, England. The Jacobean mansion was built on the ruins of a Tudor building for Sir Henry Hobart after 1616 and designed by Robert Lyminge. The library at Blickling Hall contains one of the most historically significant collections of manuscripts and books in England, containing an estimated 13,000 to 14,000 volumes. The core collection was formed by Sir Richard Ellys. The property passed into the care of the National Trust in 1940.

Between 1499 and 1505, the property was in the possession of the Boleyn family.

== Early history ==
In the 15th century, Blickling was in the possession of Sir John Fastolf of Caister in Norfolk (1380–1459), who made a fortune in the Hundred Years' War, and whose coat of arms is still on display there. Later, the property was in the possession of the Boleyn family, and home to Thomas Boleyn, later Earl of Wiltshire, and his wife Elizabeth between 1499 and 1505. Although the exact birth dates of their children are unknown, historians including Eric Ives are confident that all three surviving children were likely born at Blickling – Mary in about 1499, George in about 1504, and Anne in about 1501. A statue and portrait of Anne may be found at Blickling Estate which carry the inscription, "Anna Bolena hic nata 1507" ("Anne Boleyn born here 1507").

The house of Blickling seen today was built on the ruins of the old Boleyn property in the reign of James I, by Sir Henry Hobart, Lord Chief Justice of the Common Pleas and 1st Baronet, who bought Blickling from Lady Agnes Clere in 1616. The architect of Hatfield House, Robert Lyminge, is credited with the design of the current structure. The Lord Chief Justice married Dorothy, the daughter of Sir Robert Bell of Beaupre Hall, Outwell/Upwell, Norfolk, Speaker of the House of Commons 1572–1576.

In 1621 Frances Egerton married Sir John Hobart, 2nd Baronet and they lived together at Blickling Hall for twenty years. It was Sir John who completed the building of the house that his father had started. They incurred huge debts. Frances was able to reduce the debt by £6,000 but she had to forestall her creditors. John became not well and Frances cared for him. They had several children but only Phillipa survived. In 1647 John died and Phillipa married her cousin and her father's heir Sir John Hobart, 3rd Baronet.

== Later history ==
In 1698 the estate passed down to Sir John Hobart, the 5th Baronet who was created Earl of Buckinghamshire in 1746. He was responsible for creating the ha-ha and building the Doric Temple in the grounds, as well as extending the park by the purchase of adjacent land. His son John Hobart, 2nd Earl of Buckinghamshire remodelled the hall between 1765 and 1785. Although the estate then passed down to his youngest daughter Caroline, who was married to William Harbord, 2nd Baron Suffield, the couple died childless and it thus devolved to Caroline's nephew William Schomberg Robert Kerr, 8th Marquess of Lothian, who remodelled the west front. It thereafter passed down in the Kerr family.

== Recent history ==
During World War II the house was requisitioned and served as the Officers' Mess of nearby RAF Oulton. After the death of Philip Kerr, 11th Marquess of Lothian (the last private owner of Blickling) in December 1940, the Blickling estate passed into the care of the National Trust as part of his bequest, under the terms of the Country Houses Scheme. RAF servicemen and women were billeted within the grounds in Nissen huts, whilst officers were housed in the house itself. The adjacent lake was used by RAF service personnel to practise dinghy drills during the Second World War. The National Trust has created the RAF Oulton Museum on site in tribute to the RAF pilots and ground crew who served in the Second World War, and this may be visited for no additional entrance fee.

At the end of the war, the house was de-requisitioned. The National Trust again let it to tenants until 1960, when the Trust began work to restore the house to a style reflecting its history. The house and grounds were opened to the public in 1962 and remain open under the name of "Blickling Estate". During 2019, the site received 225,624 visitors.

In 2015 the National Trust marked the 75th anniversary of Philip Kerr's death with a celebration of his life and times.

Work began in October 2015 to introduce a heat pump system, using residual warmth from the estate's lake. Tubing, filled with a plant-based glycol, would be placed in the lake and the resulting liquid pumped into the house for further warming, enabling the heating of large parts of the house. The Trust estimated the project would save some 25,000 litres of oil each year, with cost savings in the region of £16,000.

In February 2021, it was reported that the parasitic wasp species Trichogramma evanescens was being deployed to the hall in an attempt to prevent damage to various artworks there, including a tapestry from Catherine the Great, caused by difficulties controlling the common clothes moth. In conjunction with this, chemicals to confuse the moths' mating behaviour would also be used.

== Library ==
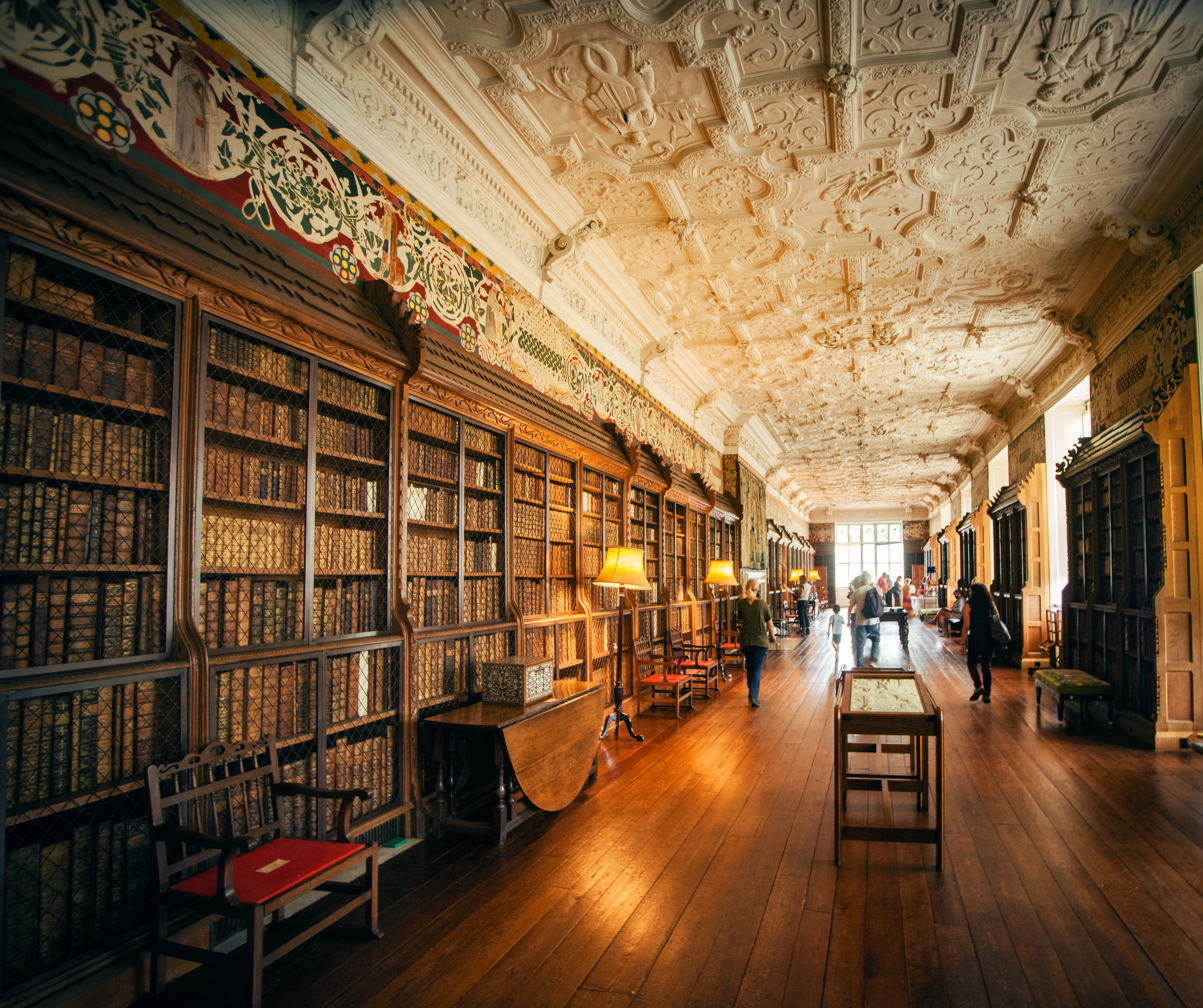
The library at Blickling Hall

The library at Blickling Estate contains one of the most historically significant collections of manuscripts and books in Great Britain. The library's estimated 13,000 to 14,000 volumes span 146 linear feet. The core collection was formed by Sir Richard Ellys (1682–1742), a cousin of the Hobarts of Blickling. The most important manuscript associated with the house is the Blickling homilies, which is one of the earliest extant examples of English vernacular homiletic writings. The Blickling homilies were first edited and translated in the 19th century by Richard Morris, whose work is still considered definitive. A more recent translation and edition by Richard J. Kelly was widely panned by scholars and critics upon publication. Another important manuscript formerly at Blickling Hall is the Blickling or Lothian Psalter, an 8th-century illuminated psalter with Old English glosses, now owned by the Pierpont Morgan Library, where it is MS M.776. The entire collection at Blickling Hall is in the process of being cataloged and put online by John Gandy, who began the project in 2010 but does not expect to finish for several years. Catalog records are available as the project progresses and accessible through the National Trust website or COPAC.

== The Blickling Estate ==
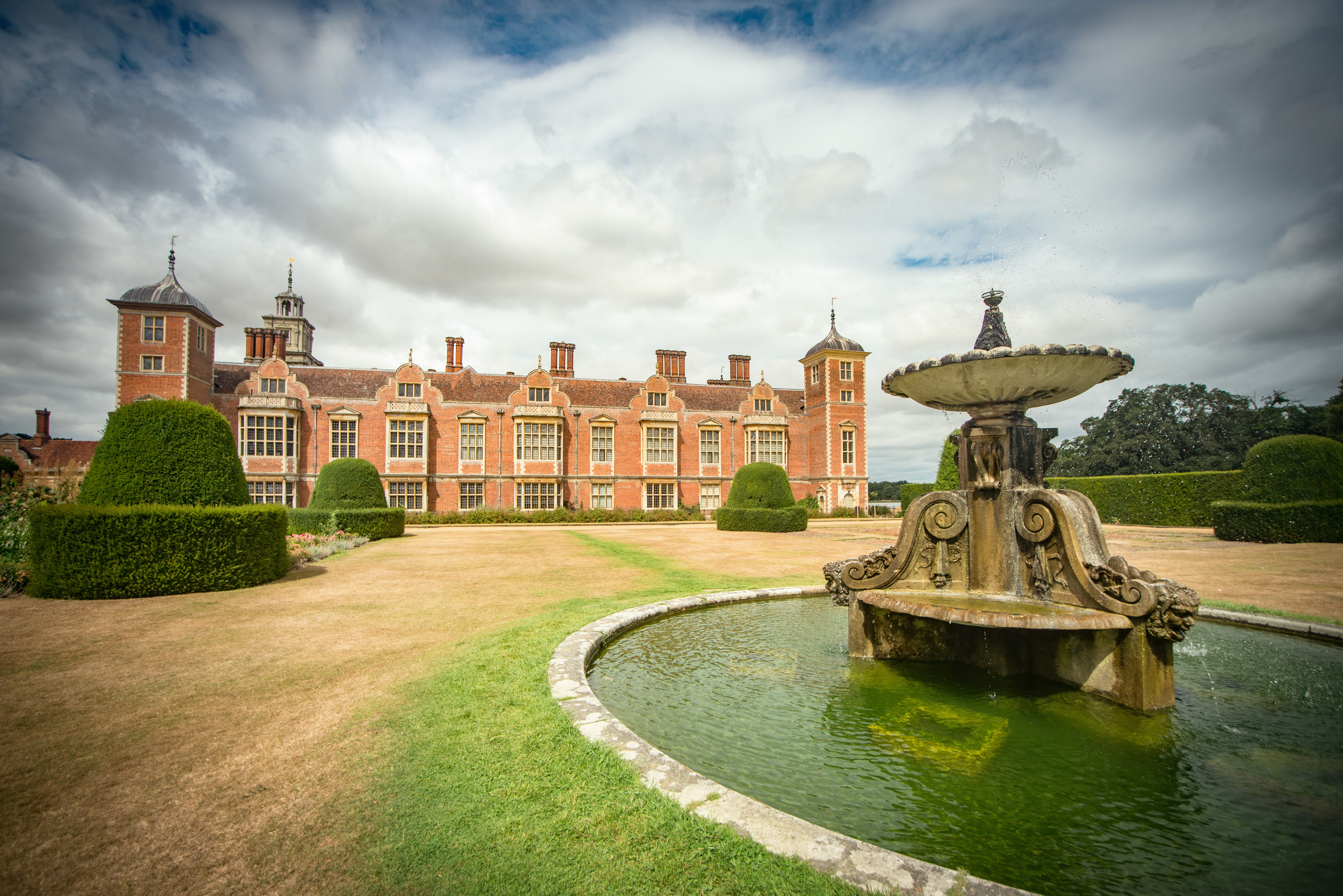
The fountain and east side of the mansion

The estate covers 4,777 acres (1,933 ha) and includes: 500 acres (200 ha) of woodland, 450 acres (180 ha) of parkland and 3,500 acres (1,400 ha) of farmland. Much of it is classified as Grade 2 and 3 agricultural land which is actively managed by the National Trust to provide income to support the house, gardens, park and woods. The estate is listed Grade II* on the Register of Historic Parks and Gardens.

=== Garden history ===
A house and garden existed at Blickling before the estate was purchased by the Boleyn family in the 1450s, but no records survive to give an indication of their appearance. After Sir Henry Hobart acquired the estate in 1616, he remodelled the gardens to include ponds, a wilderness and a parterre. A garden mount– an artificial hill in Blickling's flat landscape, was made to provide views of the new garden. With the accession of Sir John Hobart (later the 1st Earl of Buckinghamshire) in 1698 the garden was expanded to add a new wilderness and the temple was constructed.

In the latter half of the 18th century John Hobart, 2nd Earl of Buckinghamshire, embarked on works that would radically change the appearance of the gardens. All traces of formality were removed, and naturally arranged clumps of trees were planted to create a landscape garden. By the 1780s an orangery had been built to overwinter tender citrus trees. Following the 2nd Earl's death in 1793, his youngest daughter Caroline, Lady Suffield, employed landscape gardener Humphry Repton and his son John Adey Repton to advise on garden matters. John Adey Repton went on to provide designs for many garden features. The estate was inherited by nine-year-old William Schomberg Robert Kerr, 8th Marquess of Lothian in 1840. He re-introduced the formality and colour schemes of the parterre. After his death at the age of 38, responsibility for the gardens rested with Lady Lothian and her head gardener Mr Lyon. Philip Henry Kerr, 11th Marquis of Lothian, inherited the estate in 1930. After disparaging comments in Country Life, Lothian engaged gardener Norah Lindsay to remodel the gardens. In the parterre she replaced the jumble of tiny flower beds with four large square beds planted with a mixture of herbaceous plants in graduated and harmonious colours. Other changes included removal of a line of conifers in the Temple walk, which were replaced with plantings of azaleas.

== The garden ==
The garden at Blickling covers 55 acres (22 ha) and contains formal and informal gardens, Grade II listed buildings and structures, woodland, specimen trees, Victorian garden ornaments, topiary, the kitchen garden (open to the public 2010), and 18th-century yew hedges. The lawns which frame the main approach to the hall are bounded by yew hedges which were first recorded by William Freeman of Hamels in 1745. Surrounding the hall on three sides is the dry moat. The plantings in the moist, sheltered conditions of the moat were considerably revised by Lindsay who introduced hosta, species of hydrangea, buddleia and rosemary.

To the rear of the property is the noted Parterre garden which is located on the east lawn. Originally created as a Victorian sunken garden it was remodelled by Lindsay in the early 1930s. Set around an 18th-century-listed stone fountain, she divided the garden into four large, colourful herbaceous beds surrounded by L-shaped borders stocked with roses and catmint with an acorn shaped yew marking each corner. In the terraces above the parterre there are plantings of peony and seasonal beds. The western side of the garden features the lawned Acre which is fringed by a spreading oriental plane tree. Outdoor sports such as croquet are played here in the summer months. Further highlights are a collection of magnolia underplanted with autumn cyclamen, the shell fountain and the kitchen garden. To the north of the parterre is the Wilderness garden which is bisected by radial grassed avenues flanked with turkey oak, lime and beech trees and naturalised bulbs.

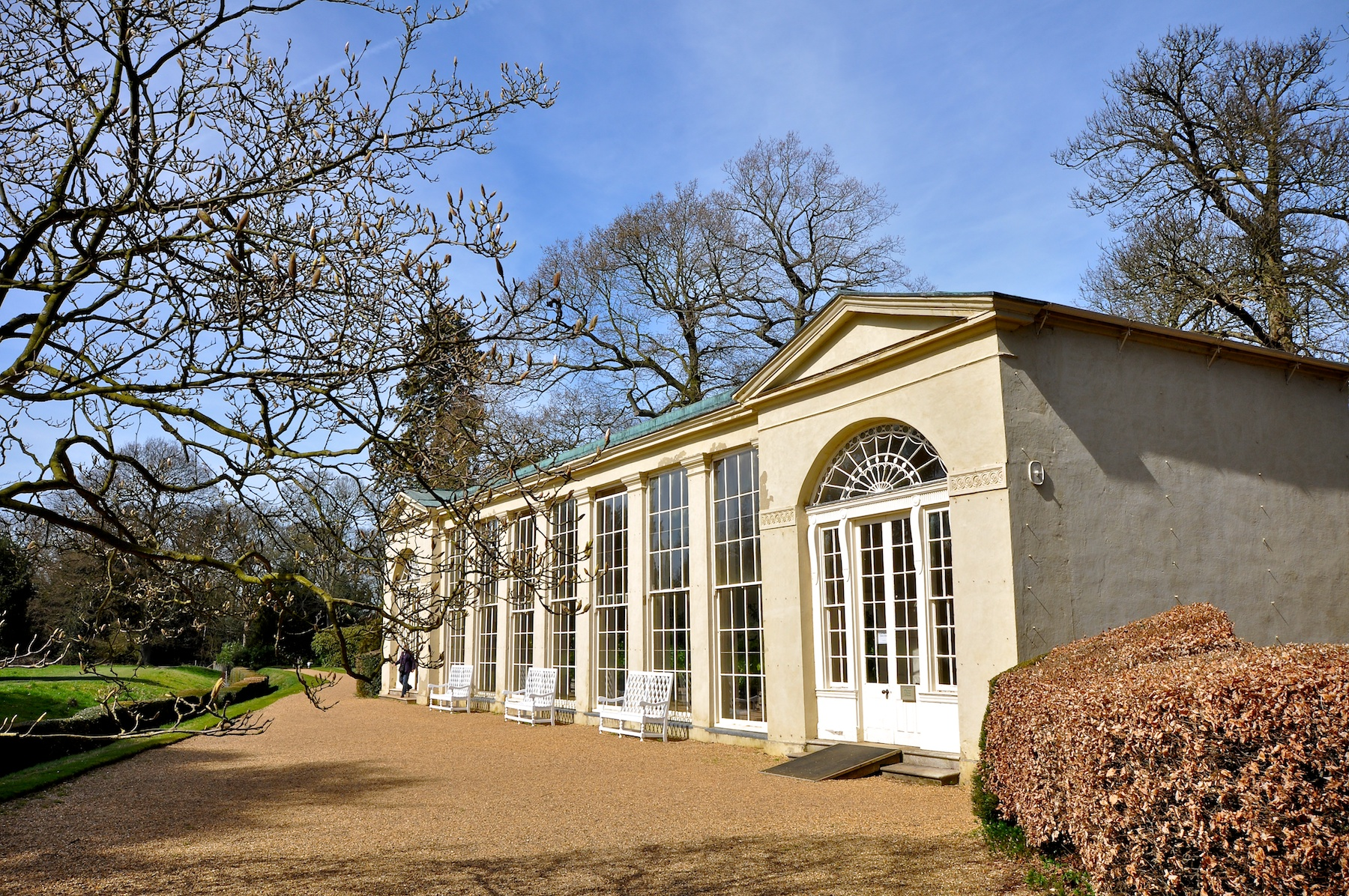
The orangery

The wilderness hides a Secret Garden with a summerhouse, scented plants and a central sundial. Nearby is the listed 18th-century orangery which houses a collection of citrus trees. Adjacent, to the building is a steep sided dell which is home to many woodland plants including a selection of hellebore and foxglove. In 2009, an area of woodland was cleared close to the orangery to create a new woodland garden. Stocked with a wide range of woodland plants including camellia and varieties of mahonia. Opened in 2010, it is known as the Orangery Garden. The Grade II listed Temple is approached by the Temple walk which is lined with azalea planted by Lindsay in her original 1930s design. Scattered throughout the garden are many garden ornaments including thirty pieces supplied to Lady Lothian in 1877 by Austin & Seeley of Euston Road, London. Starting in 2015, Blickling's unused walled garden covering 1.5 acres (0.61 ha) has been restored.

== See also ==
- Blickling Park mausoleum
