= Edward VI =

King of England and Ireland from 1547 to 1553

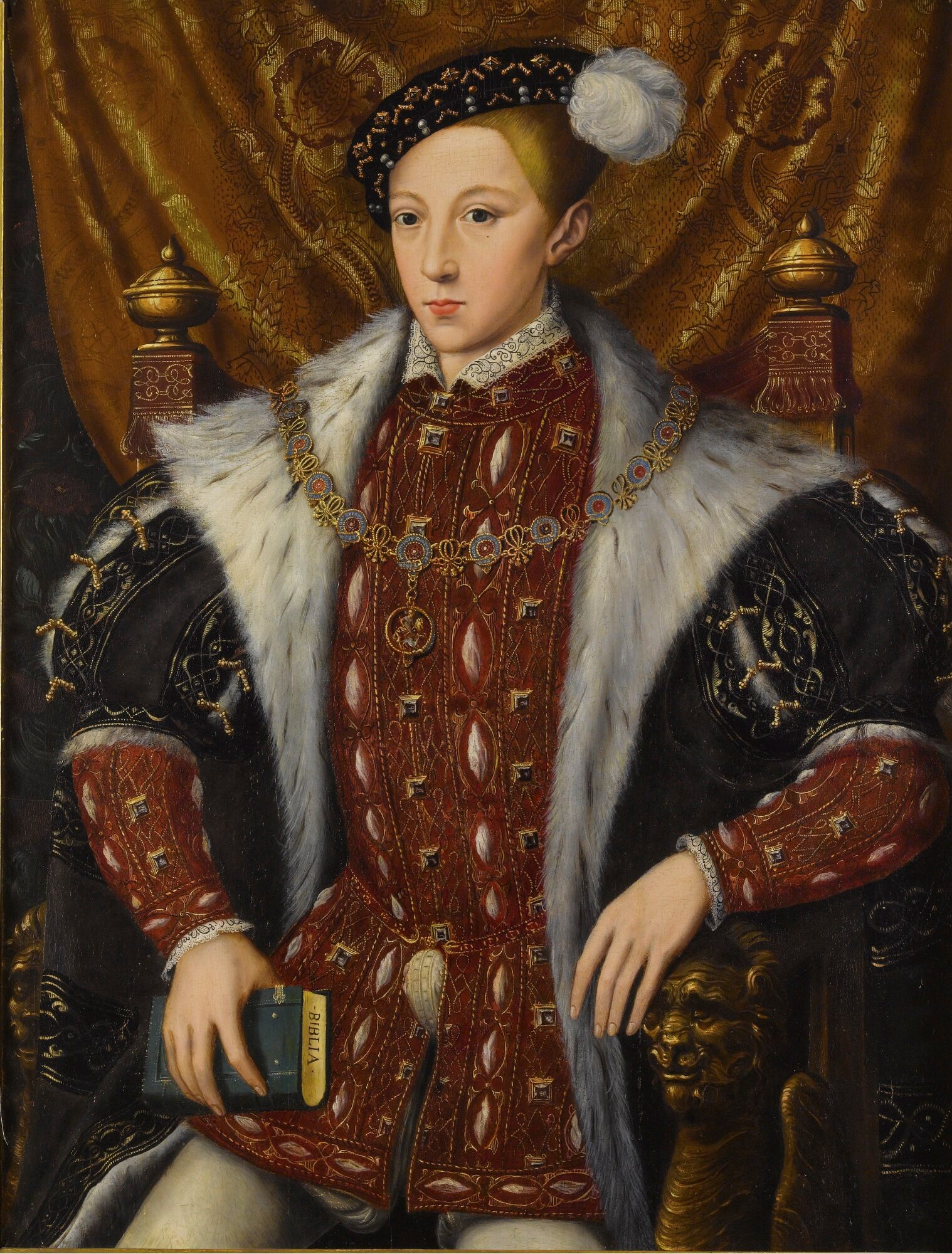
- Portrait c. 1550

King of England and Ireland
- Reign: 28 January 1547 – 6 July 1553
- Coronation: 20 February 1547
- Predecessor: Henry VIII
- Successor: Jane (disputed) or Mary I
- Regents: Edward Seymour, Duke of Somerset (1547–1549); John Dudley, Duke of Northumberland (1550–1553)
- Born: 12 October 1537; Hampton Court Palace, Surrey, England
- Died: 6 July 1553 (aged 15); Palace of Placentia, Greenwich, England
- Burial: 8 August 1553; Westminster Abbey
- House: Tudor
- Father: Henry VIII
- Mother: Jane Seymour
- Religion: Protestantism

Edward VI (12 October 1537 – 6 July 1553) was King of England and Ireland from 28 January 1547 until his death in 1553. (Note: Henry VIII had replaced the style "Lord of Ireland" with "King of Ireland" in 1541; Edward also maintained the English claim to the French throne but did not rule France.) He was crowned on 20 February 1547 at the age of nine. The only surviving son of Henry VIII by his third wife, Jane Seymour, Edward was the first English monarch to be raised as a Protestant. During his reign, the realm was governed by a regency council because Edward never reached maturity. The council was first led by his uncle Edward Seymour, Duke of Somerset (1547–1549), and then by John Dudley, Duke of Northumberland (1550–1553).

Edward's reign was marked by many economic problems and social unrest that in 1549 erupted into riot and rebellion. An expensive war with Scotland, at first successful, ended with military withdrawal from Scotland and Boulogne-sur-Mer in exchange for peace. The transformation of the Church of England into a recognisably Protestant body also occurred under Edward, who took great interest in religious matters. His father, Henry VIII, had severed the link between the English Church and Rome but continued to uphold most Catholic doctrine and ceremony. During Edward's reign, Protestantism was established for the first time in England, with reforms that included the abolition of clerical celibacy and the Latin Mass and the imposition of compulsory English in church services, including a communion service with a Protestant emphasis.

In 1553, at age 15, Edward fell ill. When his sickness was discovered to be terminal, he and his council drew up a "Devise for the Succession" to prevent the country's return to Catholicism. Edward named his Protestant first cousin once removed, Lady Jane Grey, as his heir, excluding his half-sisters, Mary and Elizabeth. This decision was disputed following Edward's death, and Jane was deposed by Mary nine days after becoming queen. Mary, a Catholic, reversed Edward's Protestant reforms during her reign, but after her, Elizabeth restored them in 1559.

== Early life ==
=== Birth ===
Edward in 1538, by Hans Holbein the Younger. He holds a golden rattle that resembles a sceptre; and the Latin inscription urges him to equal or surpass his father.

Edward was born on 12 October 1537 in his mother's apartments at Hampton Court Palace, in Middlesex, the son of King Henry VIII and his third wife, Jane Seymour, and the only son of Henry VIII to outlive him. Throughout the realm, the people greeted the birth of a male heir, "whom we hungered for so long", with joy and relief. Te Deums were sung in churches, bonfires lit, and "their was shott at the Tower that night above two thousand gonnes". Queen Jane, appearing to recover quickly from the birth, sent out personally signed letters announcing the birth of "a Prince, conceived in most lawful matrimony between my Lord the King's Majesty and us". Edward was christened on 15 October, with his 21-year-old half-sister, Lady Mary, as godmother and his 4-year-old half-sister, Lady Elizabeth, carrying the chrisom; the Garter King of Arms proclaimed him as Duke of Cornwall and Earl of Chester. However the queen fell ill and died from postnatal complications on 24 October, days after Edward's birth. Henry VIII wrote to Francis I of France that "Divine Providence ... hath mingled my joy with bitterness of the death of her who brought me this happiness".

=== Upbringing and education ===
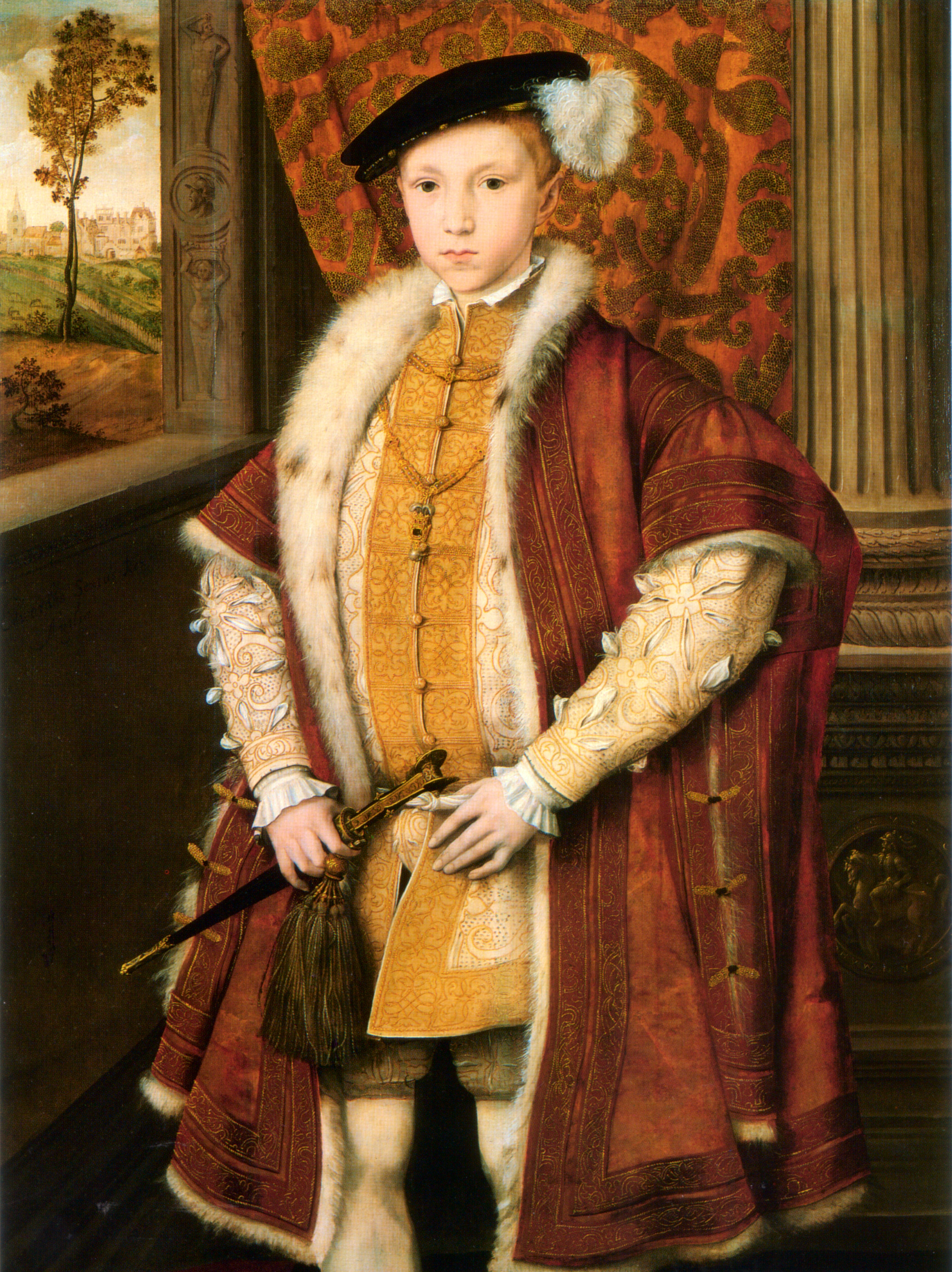
Edward as Prince of Wales, 1546. He wears the Prince of Wales's feathers and crown on the pendant jewel. Attributed to William Scrots. Royal Collection, Windsor Castle

Edward was a healthy baby who suckled strongly from the outset. His father was delighted with him; in May 1538, Henry was observed "dallying with him in his arms ... and so holding him in a window to the sight and great comfort of the people". That September, the Lord Chancellor, Lord Audley, reported Edward's rapid growth and vigour, and other accounts describe him as a tall and merry child. The tradition that Edward VI was a sickly boy has been challenged by more recent historians. At age four, he fell ill with a life-threatening "quartan fever", (Note: A fever recurring about every four days, today usually associated with malaria.) but, despite occasional illnesses and poor eyesight, he enjoyed generally good health until the last six months of his life. (Note: Edward was also ill in 1550 and "of the measles and the smallpox" in 1552.)

Edward was initially placed in the care of Margaret Bryan, "lady mistress" of the prince's household. She was succeeded by Blanche Herbert, Lady Troy. Until the age of six, Edward was brought up, as he put it later in his Chronicle, "among the women". The formal royal household established around Edward was, at first, under William Sidney, and later Richard Page, stepfather of Edward's aunt Anne (the wife of Edward Seymour). Henry demanded exacting standards of security and cleanliness in his son's household, stressing that Edward was "this whole realm's most precious jewel". Visitors described the prince, who was lavishly provided with toys and comforts, including his own troupe of minstrels, as a contented child.

From the age of six, Edward began his formal education under Richard Cox and John Cheke, concentrating, as he recalled himself, on "learning of tongues, of the scripture, of philosophy, and all liberal sciences". (Note: For example, he read biblical texts, Cato, Aesop's Fables and Vives's Satellitium Vivis, which were written for his sister, Mary.) He received tuition from his sister Elizabeth's tutor, Roger Ascham, and from Jean Belmain, learning French, Spanish and Italian. In addition, he is known to have studied geometry and learned to play musical instruments, including the lute and the virginals. He collected globes and maps and, according to coinage historian C. E. Challis, developed a grasp of monetary affairs that indicated high intelligence. Edward's religious education is assumed to have favoured the reforming agenda. His religious establishment was probably chosen by Archbishop Thomas Cranmer, a leading reformer. Both Cox and Cheke were "reformed" Catholics, or Erasmians, and later became Marian exiles. By 1549, Edward had written a treatise on the pope as Antichrist and was making informed notes on theological controversies. Many aspects of his religion were essentially Catholic in his early years, including the celebration of the mass and reverence for images and relics of the saints.

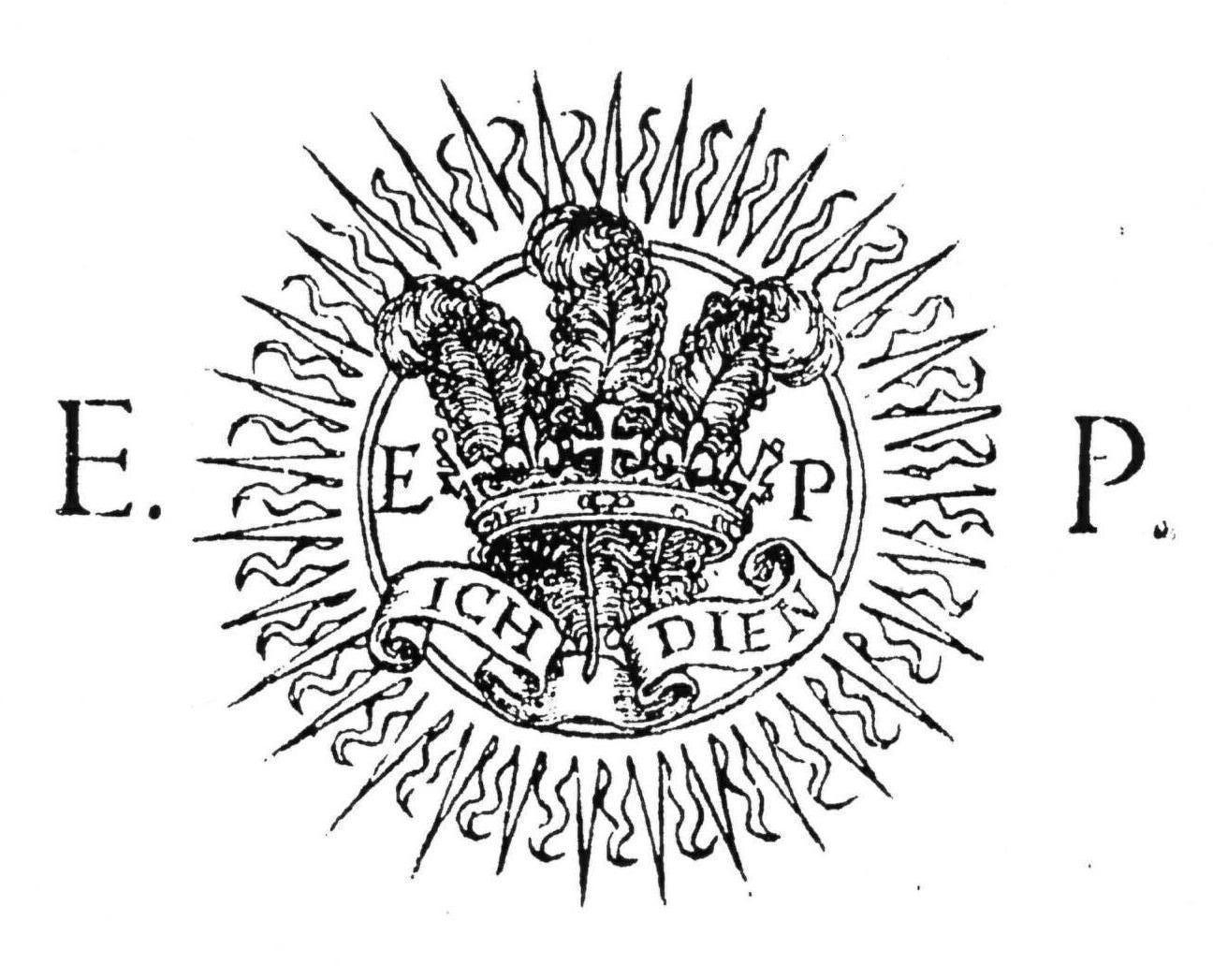
The badge of Prince Edward, from John Leland's Genethliacon illustrissimi Eaduerdi principis Cambriae (1543)

Both Edward's sisters were attentive to their brother and often visited him—on one occasion, Elizabeth gave him a shirt "of her own working". Edward "took special content" in Mary's company, though he disapproved of her taste for foreign dances; "I love you most", he wrote to her in 1546. In 1543, Henry invited his children to spend Christmas with him, signalling his reconciliation with his daughters, whom he had previously illegitimised and disinherited. The following spring, he restored them to their place in the succession with a Third Succession Act, which also provided for a regency council during Edward's minority. (Note: Mary and Elizabeth remained technically illegitimate, succeeding to the crown due to Henry's nomination. They could lose their rights, for example by marrying without the consent of the Privy Council.) This unaccustomed family harmony may have owed much to the influence of Henry's sixth wife, Catherine Parr, of whom Edward soon became fond. He called her his "most dear mother" and in September 1546 wrote to her: "I received so many benefits from you that my mind can hardly grasp them."

Other children were brought to play with Edward, including the granddaughter of his chamberlain, William Sidney, who in adulthood recalled the prince as "a marvellous sweet child, of very mild and generous condition". Edward was educated with sons of nobles, "appointed to attend upon him" in what was a form of miniature court. Among these, Barnaby Fitzpatrick, son of an Irish peer, became a close and lasting friend. Edward was more devoted to his schoolwork than his classmates and seems to have outshone them, motivated to do his "duty" and compete with his sister Elizabeth's academic prowess. Edward's surroundings and possessions were regally splendid: his rooms were hung with costly Flemish tapestries, and his clothes, books and cutlery were encrusted with precious jewels and gold. Like his father, Edward was fascinated by military arts, and many of his portraits show him wearing a gold dagger with a jewelled hilt, in imitation of Henry. (Note: Such portraits were modelled on Hans Holbein the Younger's depiction of Henry VIII for a wall-painting at Whitehall in 1537, in which Henry confronts the viewer, wearing a dagger. See Remigius van Leemput's 1667 copy of the mural, which was destroyed in a fire in 1698.) Edward's Chronicle enthusiastically details English military campaigns against Scotland and France, and adventures such as John Dudley's near capture at Musselburgh in 1547.

=== "The Rough Wooing" ===
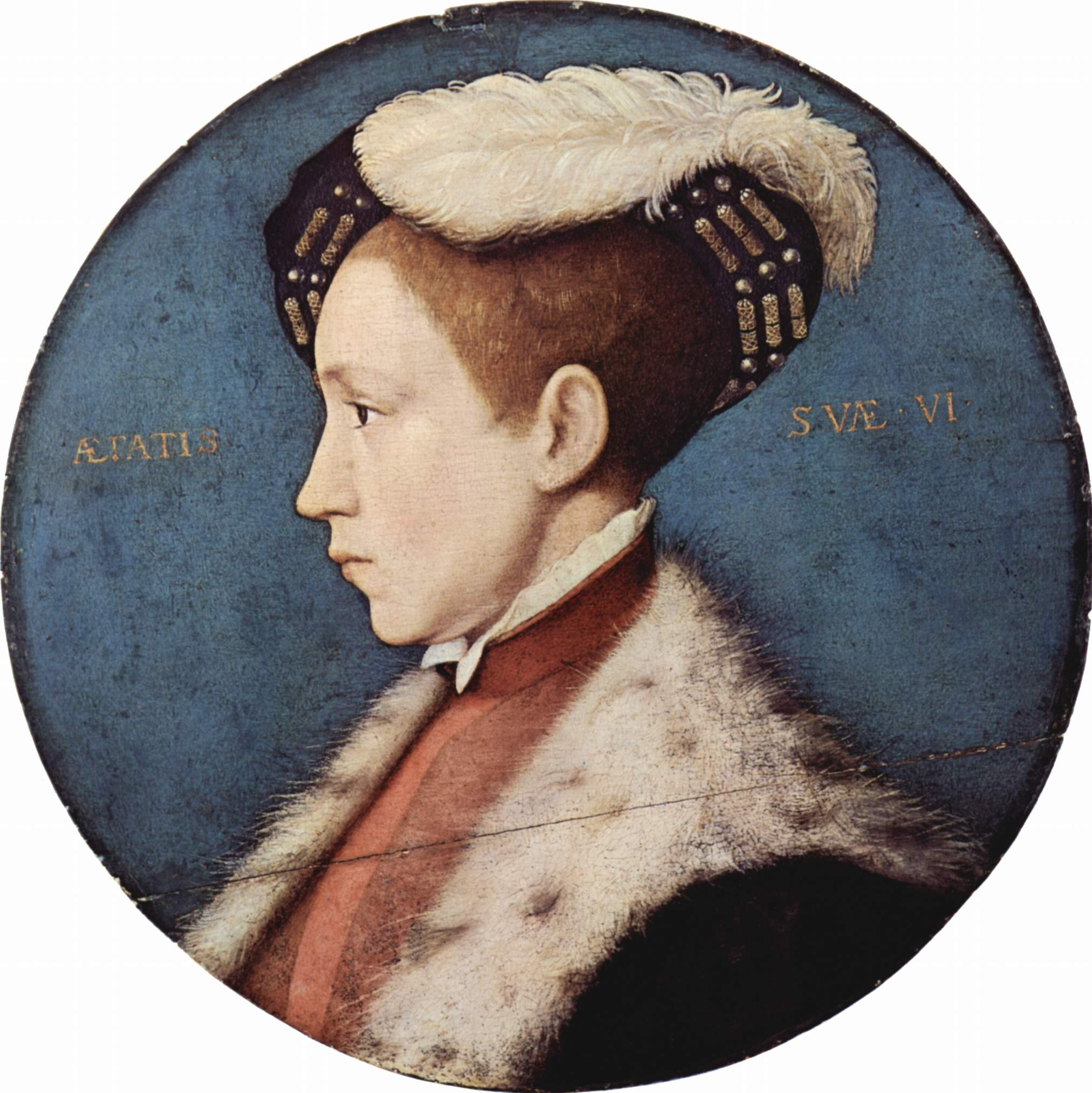
Portrait miniature of Edward by an unknown artist, (Note: This miniature, formerly attributed to Hans Holbein the Younger and one of several versions derived from the same pattern, is now thought likely to be by a follower of William Scrots. The background inscription gives Edward's age as six, but this has been doubted after x-rays of the underpainting.) c. 1543–1546, Metropolitan Museum of Art, New York

On 1 July 1543, Henry signed the Treaty of Greenwich with the Scots, sealing the peace with Edward's betrothal to the seven-month-old Mary, Queen of Scots, granddaughter of Edward's aunt and Henry's sister Margaret Tudor. The Scots were in a weak bargaining position after their defeat at the Battle of Solway Moss in November 1542, and Henry, seeking to unite the two realms, stipulated that Mary be handed over to him to be brought up in England. When the Scots repudiated the treaty in December 1543 and renewed their alliance with France, Henry was enraged. In April 1544, he ordered Edward's uncle, Edward Seymour, 1st Earl of Hertford, to invade Scotland and "put all to fire and sword, burn Edinburgh town, so razed and defaced when you have sacked and gotten what ye can of it, as there may remain forever a perpetual memory of the vengeance of God lightened upon [them] for their falsehood and disloyalty". Seymour responded with the most savage campaign ever launched by the English against the Scots. (Note: "His detailed reports to his master are a hideous record of fire and bloodshed, chronicled in the most factual and laconic manner.") The war, which continued into Edward's reign, has become known as "the Rough Wooing".

== Accession ==
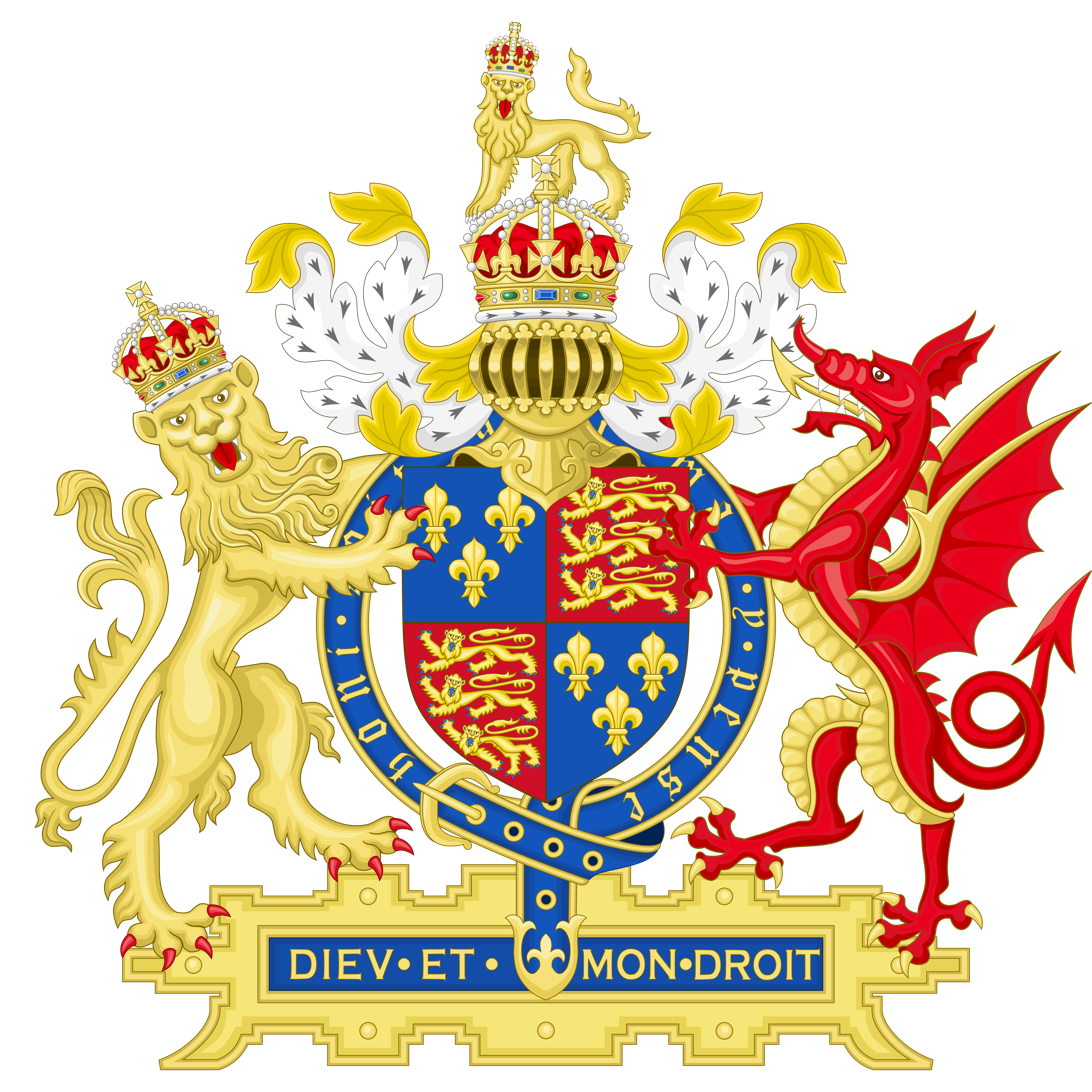
Coat of arms of Edward VI

The nine-year-old Edward wrote to his father and stepmother on 10 January 1547 from Hertford thanking them for his New Year's gift of their portraits from life. By 28 January, Henry VIII was dead. Those close to the throne, led by Edward Seymour and William Paget, agreed to delay the announcement of the king's death until arrangements had been made for a smooth succession. Seymour and Sir Anthony Browne, the Master of the Horse, rode to collect Edward from Hertford and brought him to Enfield, where Lady Elizabeth was living. He and Elizabeth were then told of their father's death and heard a reading of his will.

Lord Chancellor Thomas Wriothesley announced Henry's death to Parliament on 31 January 1547, and general proclamations of Edward's succession were ordered. The new king was taken to the Tower of London, where he was welcomed with "great shot of ordnance in all places there about, as well out of the Tower as out of the ships". The next day, the nobles of the realm made their obeisance to Edward at the Tower, and Seymour was announced as Protector. Henry VIII was buried at Windsor on 16 February, in the same tomb as Jane Seymour, as he had wished.

Edward VI was crowned at Westminster Abbey on Sunday, 20 February. The ceremonies were shortened, because of the "tedious length of the same which should weary and be hurtsome peradventure to the King's majesty, being yet of tender age", and also because the Reformation had rendered some of them inappropriate.

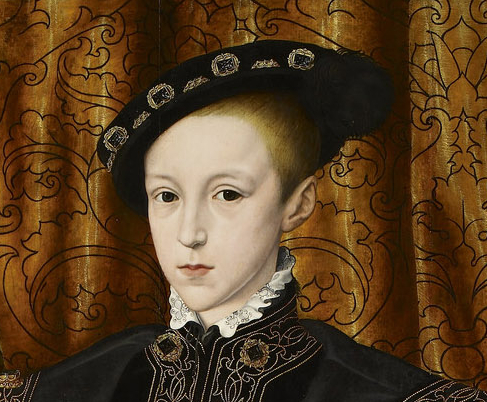
Portrait of Edward VI, aged about thirteen, by William Scrots

On the eve of the coronation, Edward progressed on horseback from the Tower to the Palace of Westminster through thronging crowds and pageants, many based on the pageants for a previous boy king, Henry VI. He laughed at a Spanish tightrope walker who "tumbled and played many pretty toys" outside St Paul's Cathedral.

At the coronation service, Cranmer affirmed the royal supremacy and called Edward a second Josiah, urging him to continue the reformation of the Church of England, "the tyranny of the Bishops of Rome banished from your subjects, and images removed". After the service, Edward presided at a banquet in Westminster Hall, where, he recalled in his Chronicle, he dined with his crown on his head.

== Somerset's protectorate ==
=== Council of regency ===
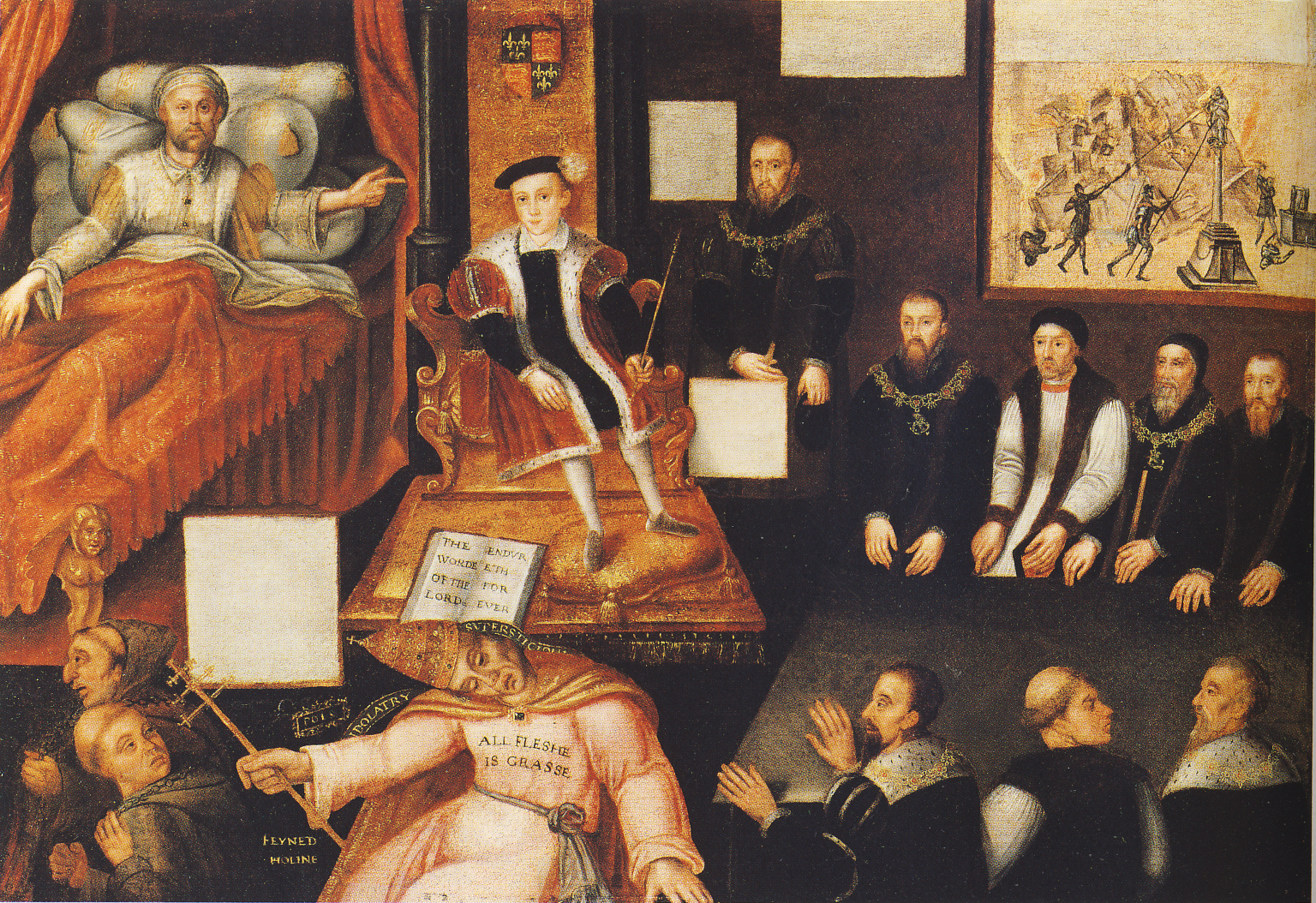
Edward VI and the Pope: An Allegory of the Reformation. This Elizabethan work of propaganda depicts the handing over of power from Henry VIII, who lies dying in bed, to Edward VI, seated beneath a cloth of state with a slumping pope at his feet. In the top right of the picture is an image of men pulling down and smashing idols. At Edward's side are his uncle the Lord Protector Edward Seymour and members of the Privy Council. National Portrait Gallery, London

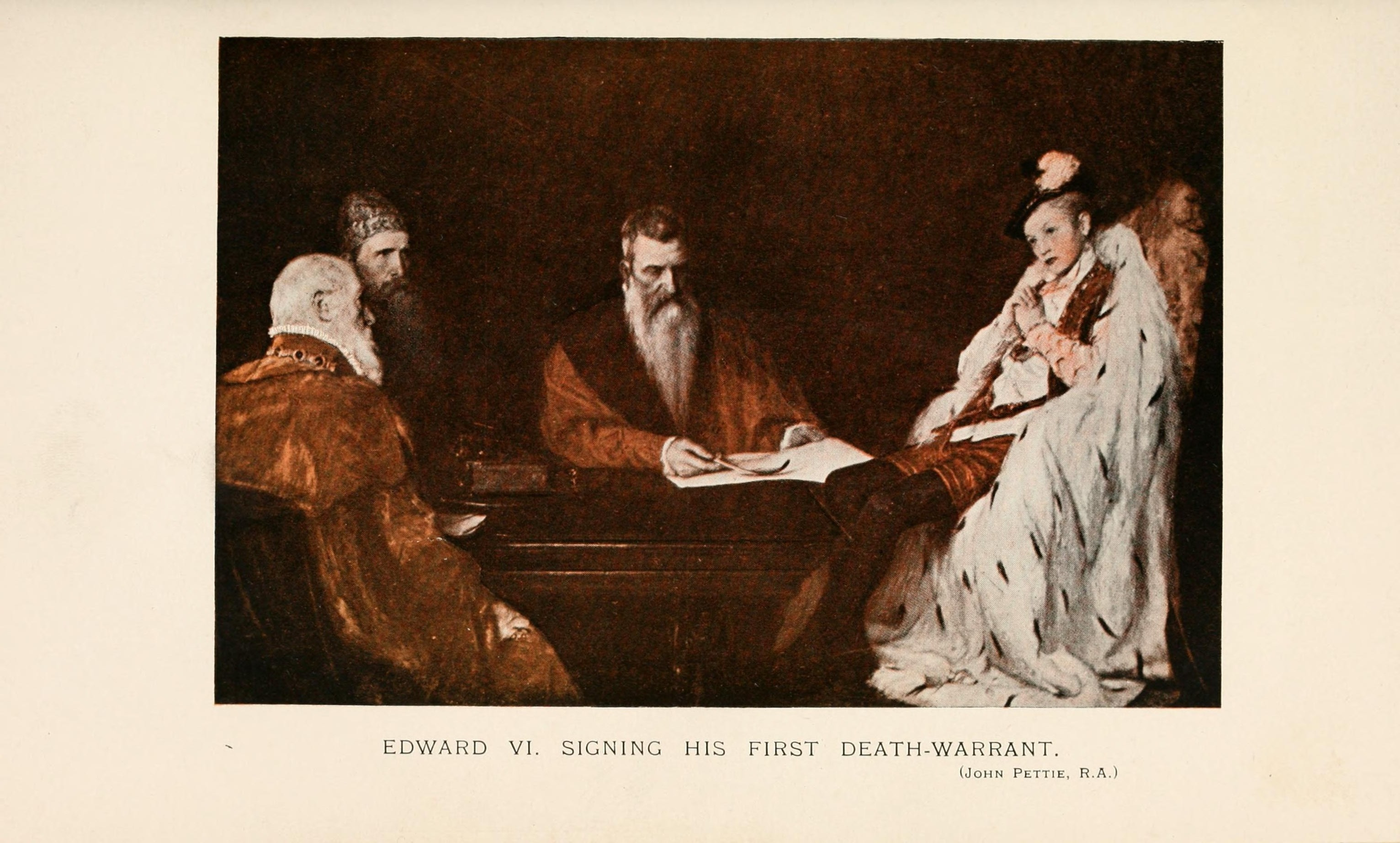
Edward VI signing his first death warrant, by John Pettie R. A.

Henry VIII's will named sixteen executors, who were to act as Edward's council until he reached age 18. The executors were supplemented by twelve men "of counsail" who would assist them when called on. The final state of Henry VIII's will has been the subject of controversy. Some historians suggest that those close to the king manipulated either him or the will itself to ensure a share-out of power to their benefit, both material and religious. In this reading, the composition of the Privy Chamber shifted towards the end of 1546 in favour of the reforming faction. In addition, two leading conservative Privy Councillors were removed from the centre of power.

Stephen Gardiner was refused access to Henry during his last months. Thomas Howard, Duke of Norfolk, found himself accused of treason; the day before the king's death, his vast estates were seized, making them available for redistribution, and he spent the whole of Edward's reign in the Tower of London. Other historians have argued that Gardiner's exclusion was based on non-religious matters, that Norfolk was not noticeably conservative in religion, that conservatives remained on the council, and that the radicalism of such men as Anthony Denny, who controlled the dry stamp that replicated the king's signature, is debatable.

Whatever the case, Henry's death was followed by a lavish handout of lands and honours to the new power group. The will contained an "unfulfilled gifts" clause, added at the last minute, which allowed the executors to freely distribute lands and honours to themselves and the court, particularly to Edward Seymour, the new king's uncle who became Lord Protector of the Realm, Governor of the King's Person and Duke of Somerset.

Henry VIII's will did not provide for the appointment of a Protector. It entrusted the government of the realm during his son's minority to a regency council that would rule collectively, by majority decision, with "like and equal charge". (Note: The existence of a council of executors alongside the Privy Council was rationalised in March when the two became one, incorporating the executors and most of their appointed assistants and adding the now Duke of Somerset's brother Thomas Seymour, who had protested at his exclusion from power.) Nevertheless, a few days after Henry's death, on 4 February, the executors chose to invest almost regal power in the Duke of Somerset. Thirteen of the sixteen (the others being absent) agreed to his appointment as Protector, which they justified as their joint decision "by virtue of the authority" of Henry's will. Somerset may have done a deal with some of the executors, who almost all received hand-outs. He is known to have done so with William Paget, private secretary to Henry VIII, (Note: In 1549, Paget was to remind Seymour: "Remember what you promised me in the gallery at Westminster before the breath was out of the body of the king that dead is. Remember what you promised immediately after, devising with me concerning the place which you now occupy ... and that was to follow mine advice in all your proceedings more than any other man's".) and to have secured the support of Sir Anthony Browne of the Privy Chamber.

Somerset's appointment was in keeping with historical precedent, (Note: Uncles of the king had been made Protector in 1422 and 1483 during the minorities of Henry VI and Edward V (though not also Governor of the King's Person, as noted by the Duke's brother Thomas, who coveted the role for himself).) and his eligibility for the role was reinforced by his military successes in Scotland and France. In March 1547, he secured letters patent from Edward, granting him the almost monarchical right to appoint members to the Privy Council himself and to consult them only when he wished. (Note: In 1549, William Paget described him as king in all but name.) In the words of historian Geoffrey Elton, "from that moment his autocratic system was complete". He proceeded to rule largely by proclamation, calling on the Privy Council to do little more than rubber-stamp his decisions.

Somerset's takeover of power was smooth and efficient. The imperial ambassador, François van der Delft, reported that he "governs everything absolutely", with Paget operating as his secretary, though he predicted trouble from John Dudley, Viscount Lisle, who had recently been raised to Earl of Warwick in the share-out of honours. In fact, in the early weeks of his Protectorate, Somerset was challenged only by the Chancellor, Thomas Wriothesley, whom the Earldom of Southampton had evidently failed to buy off, and by his own brother. Wriothesley, a religious conservative, objected to Somerset's assumption of monarchical power over the council. He then found himself abruptly dismissed from the chancellorship on charges of selling off some of his offices to delegates.

=== Thomas Seymour ===
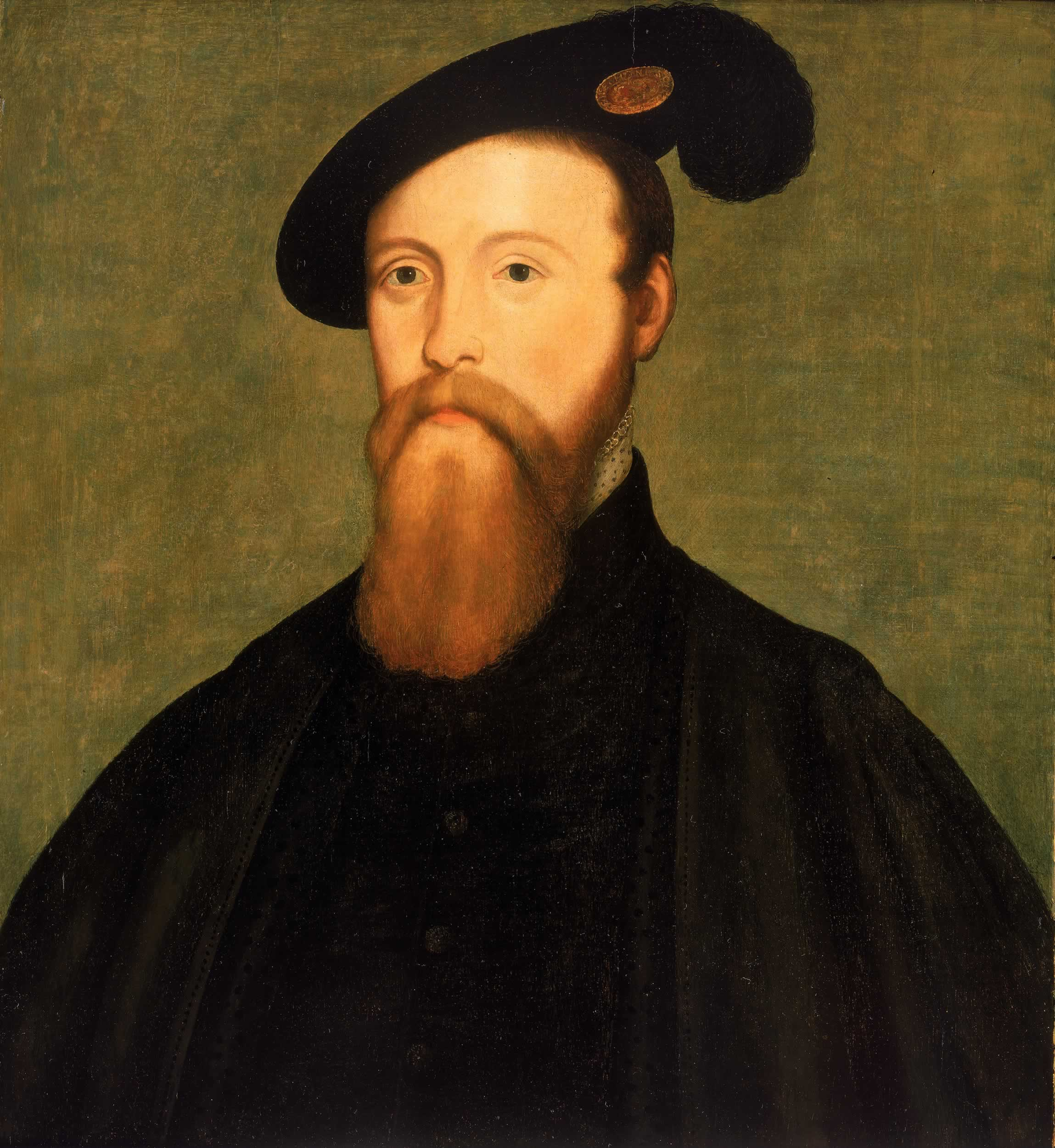
Thomas Seymour, Baron Seymour of Sudeley

Somerset faced less manageable opposition from his younger brother Thomas, who has been described as a "worm in the bud". As the king's uncle, Thomas Seymour demanded the governorship of the king's person and a greater share of power. Somerset tried to buy his brother off with a barony, an appointment to the Lord Admiralship, and a seat on the Privy Council, but Thomas was bent on scheming for power. He began smuggling pocket money to Edward, telling him that Somerset held the purse strings too tight, making him a "beggarly king". He also urged the king to throw off the Protector within two years and "bear rule as other kings do"; but Edward, schooled to defer to the council, failed to cooperate. In the spring of 1547, using Edward's support to circumvent Somerset's opposition, Thomas Seymour secretly married Henry VIII's widow Catherine Parr, whose Protestant household included the 11-year-old Lady Jane Grey and the 13-year-old Lady Elizabeth.

In summer 1548, a pregnant Catherine Parr discovered Thomas Seymour embracing Lady Elizabeth. As a result, Elizabeth was removed from Parr's household and transferred to Sir Anthony Denny's. That September, Parr died shortly after childbirth, and Seymour promptly resumed his attentions to Elizabeth by letter, planning to marry her. Elizabeth was receptive, but, like Edward, unwilling to agree to anything the council had not permitted. In January 1549, the council had Thomas Seymour arrested on various charges, including embezzlement at the Bristol mint. Edward, whom Seymour was accused of planning to marry to Lady Jane Grey, himself testified about the pocket money. Lack of clear evidence for treason ruled out a trial, so Seymour was condemned instead by an act of attainder and beheaded on 20 March 1549.

=== War ===
Somerset's only undoubted skill was as a soldier, which he had proven on expeditions to Scotland and in the defence of Boulogne-sur-Mer in 1546. From the first, his main interest as Protector was the war against Scotland. After a crushing victory at the Battle of Pinkie in September 1547, he set up a network of garrisons in Scotland, stretching as far north as Dundee. But his initial successes were followed by a loss of direction, as his aim of uniting the realms through conquest became increasingly unrealistic. The Scots allied with France, who sent reinforcements for the defence of Edinburgh in 1548. The Queen of Scots was moved to France, where she was betrothed to the Dauphin. The cost of maintaining the Protector's massive armies and his permanent garrisons in Scotland also placed an unsustainable burden on the royal finances. A French attack on Boulogne in August 1549 at last forced Somerset to begin a withdrawal from Scotland.

=== Rebellion ===
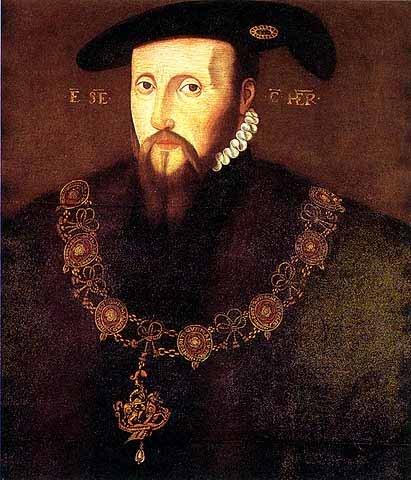
Edward VI's uncle, Edward Seymour, Duke of Somerset, ruled England in the name of his nephew as Lord Protector from 1547 to 1549.

During 1548, England was subject to social unrest. After April 1549, a series of armed revolts broke out, fuelled by various religious and agrarian grievances. The two most serious rebellions, which required major military intervention to put down, were in Devon and Cornwall and in Norfolk. The first, sometimes called the Prayer Book Rebellion, arose from the imposition of Protestantism, and the second, led by a tradesman called Robert Kett, mainly from the encroachment of landlords on common grazing ground. A complex aspect of the social unrest was that the protesters believed they were acting legitimately against enclosing landlords with the Protector's support, convinced that the landlords were the lawbreakers. (Note: For example, in Hereford, a man was recorded as saying that "by the king's proclamation all enclosures were to be broken up.")

The same justification for outbreaks of unrest was voiced throughout the country, not only in Norfolk and the west. The origin of the popular view of Somerset as sympathetic to the rebel cause lies partly in his series of sometimes liberal, often contradictory, proclamations, (Note: Some proclamations expressed sympathy for the victims of enclosure and announced action; some condemned the destruction of enclosures and associated riots; another announced pardons for those who had destroyed enclosures by mistake ("of folly and of mistaking") after misunderstanding the meaning of proclamations, so long as they were sorry.) and partly in the uncoordinated activities of the commissions he sent out in 1548 and 1549 to investigate grievances about loss of tillage, encroachment of large sheep flocks on common land, and similar issues. Somerset's commissions were led by the evangelical MP John Hales, whose socially liberal rhetoric linked the issue of enclosure with Reformation theology and the notion of a godly commonwealth. Local groups often assumed that these commissions' findings entitled them to act against offending landlords themselves. Edward wrote in his Chronicle that the 1549 risings began "because certain commissions were sent down to pluck down enclosures".

Whatever the popular view of Somerset, the disastrous events of 1549 were taken as evidence of a colossal failure of government, and the council laid the responsibility at the Protector's door. In July 1549, Paget wrote to Somerset: "Every man of the council have misliked your proceedings ... would to God, that, at the first stir you had followed the matter hotly, and caused justice to be ministered in solemn fashion to the terror of others".

=== Fall of Somerset ===
The sequence of events that led to Somerset's removal from power has often been called a coup d'état. By 1 October 1549, Somerset had been alerted that his rule faced a serious threat. He issued a proclamation calling for assistance, took possession of the king's person, and withdrew for safety to the fortified Windsor Castle, where Edward wrote, "Me thinks I am in prison". Meanwhile, a united council published details of Somerset's government mismanagement. They made clear that the Protector's power came from them, not from Henry VIII's will. On 11 October, the council had Somerset arrested and brought the king to Richmond Palace. Edward summarised the charges against Somerset in his Chronicle: "ambition, vainglory, entering into rash wars in mine youth, negligent looking on Newhaven, enriching himself of my treasure, following his own opinion, and doing all by his own authority, etc." In February 1550, John Dudley, Earl of Warwick, emerged as the leader of the council and, in effect, as Somerset's successor. Somerset was released from the Tower and restored to the council, but he was executed for felony in January 1552 after scheming to overthrow Dudley's regime. Edward noted his uncle's death in his Chronicle: "the duke of Somerset had his head cut off upon Tower Hill between eight and nine o'clock in the morning".

Historians contrast the efficiency of Somerset's takeover of power, in which they detect the organising skills of allies such as Paget, the "master of practices", with the subsequent ineptitude of his rule. By autumn 1549, his costly wars had lost momentum, the crown faced financial ruin, and riots and rebellions had broken out around the country. Until recent decades, Somerset's reputation with historians was high, in view of his many proclamations that appeared to back the common people against a rapacious landowning class. More recently, he has often been portrayed as an arrogant and aloof ruler, lacking in political and administrative skills.

== Northumberland's leadership ==
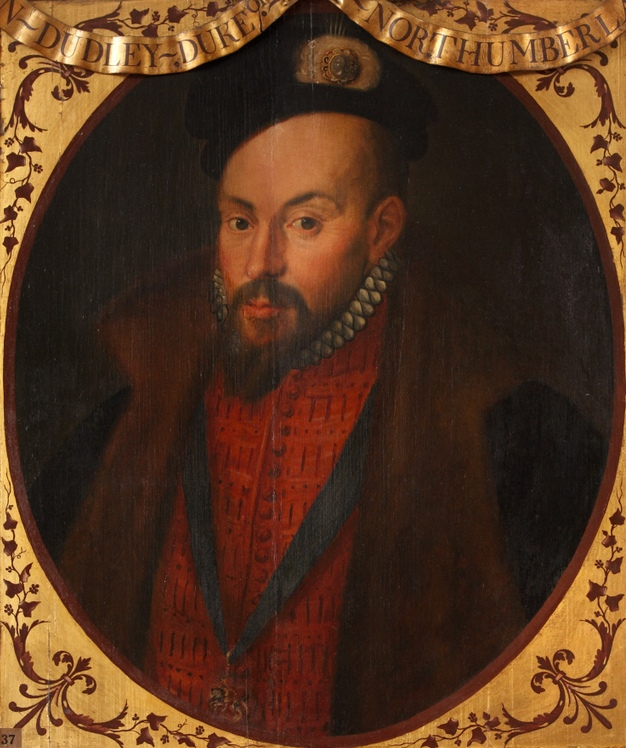
John Dudley, Earl of Warwick, later 1st Duke of Northumberland, led the Privy Council after the downfall of Somerset.

In contrast, Somerset's successor, the Earl of Warwick, made Duke of Northumberland in 1551, was once regarded by historians merely as a grasping schemer who cynically elevated and enriched himself at the expense of the crown. Since the 1970s, the administrative and economic achievements of his regime have been recognised, and he has been credited with restoring the royal council's authority and returning the government to an even keel after the disasters of Somerset's protectorate.

The Earl of Warwick's rival for leadership of the new regime was Thomas Wriothesley, Earl of Southampton, whose conservative supporters had allied with Warwick's followers to create a unanimous council which they and observers, such as the Holy Roman Emperor Charles V's ambassador, expected to reverse Somerset's policy of religious reform. Warwick, on the other hand, pinned his hopes on the king's strong Protestantism and, claiming that Edward was old enough to rule in person, moved himself and his people closer to the king, taking control of the Privy Chamber. Paget, accepting a barony, joined Warwick when he realised that a conservative policy would not bring the emperor onto the English side over Boulogne. Southampton prepared a case for executing Somerset, aiming to discredit Warwick through Somerset's statements that he had done all with Warwick's co-operation. As a counter-move, Warwick convinced Parliament to free Somerset, which it did on 14 January 1550. Warwick then had Southampton and his followers purged from the council after winning the support of council members in return for titles, and was made Lord President of the Council and great master of the king's household. Although not called a Protector, he was now clearly the head of the government.

As Edward grew up, he understood more and more government business. His actual involvement in decisions has long been a matter of debate, and during the 20th century, historians have presented the whole gamut of possibilities, "balanc[ing] an articulate puppet against a mature, precocious, and essentially adult king", in Stephen Alford's words. A special "Counsel for the Estate" was created when Edward was fourteen. He chose the members himself. In the weekly meetings with this council, Edward was "to hear the debating of things of most importance". A major point of contact with the king was the Privy Chamber, and there Edward worked closely with William Cecil and William Petre, the principal secretaries. The king's greatest influence was in matters of religion, where the council followed the strongly Protestant policy he favoured.

The Duke of Northumberland's mode of operation was very different from Somerset's. Careful to make sure he always commanded a majority of councillors, he encouraged a working council and used it to legitimise his authority. Lacking Somerset's blood-relationship with the king, he added members to the council from his own faction in order to control it. He also added members of his family to the royal household. He saw that to achieve personal dominance, he needed total procedural control of the council. In the words of historian John Guy, "Like Somerset, he became quasi-king; the difference was that he managed the bureaucracy on the pretence that Edward had assumed full sovereignty, whereas Somerset had asserted the right to near-sovereignty as Protector".

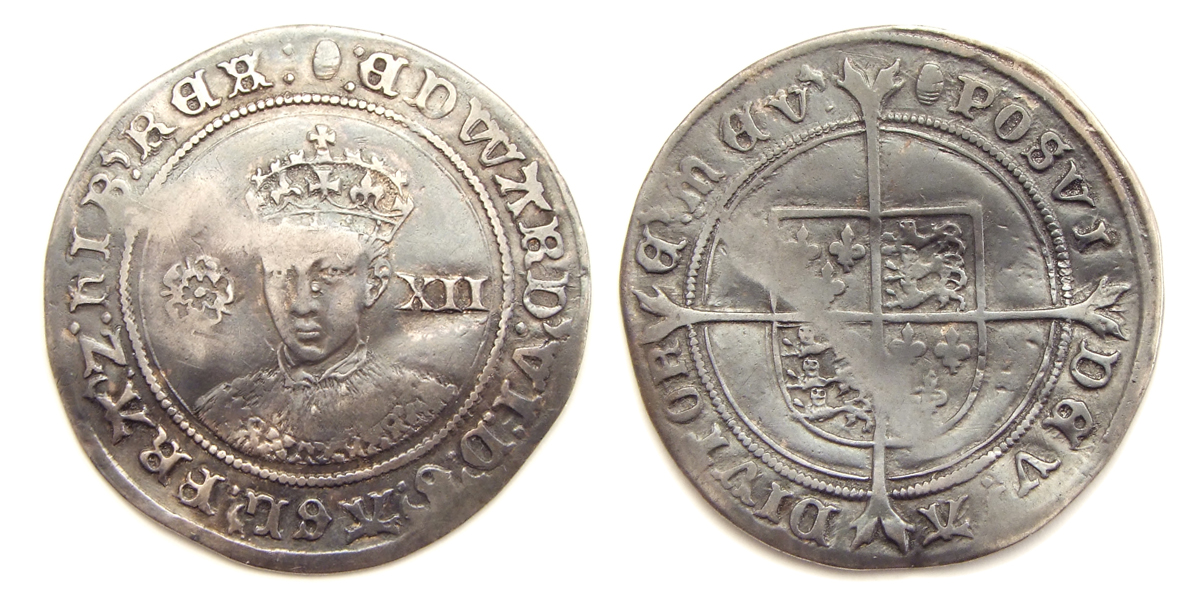
Shilling with portrait of Edward VI, struck 1551–1553

Warwick's war policies were more pragmatic than Somerset's, and they have earned him criticism for weakness. In 1550, he signed a peace treaty with France that agreed to withdrawal from Boulogne and recalled all English garrisons from Scotland. In 1551, Edward was betrothed to Elisabeth of Valois, King Henry II's daughter, and was made a Knight of Saint Michael. Warwick realised that England could no longer support the cost of wars. At home, he took measures to police local unrest. To forestall future rebellions, he kept permanent representatives of the crown in the localities, including lords lieutenant, who commanded military forces and reported back to central government.

Working with William Paulet and Walter Mildmay, Warwick tackled the disastrous state of the kingdom's finances. His regime succumbed to the temptations of a quick profit by further debasing the coinage. The resulting economic disaster caused Warwick to hand the initiative to the expert Thomas Gresham. By 1552, confidence in the coinage was restored, prices fell and trade at last improved. Though a full economic recovery was not achieved until Elizabeth's reign, its origins lay in the Duke of Northumberland's policies. The regime also cracked down on widespread embezzlement of government finances and carried out a thorough review of revenue collection practices, which has been called "one of the more remarkable achievements of Tudor administration".

== Reformation ==
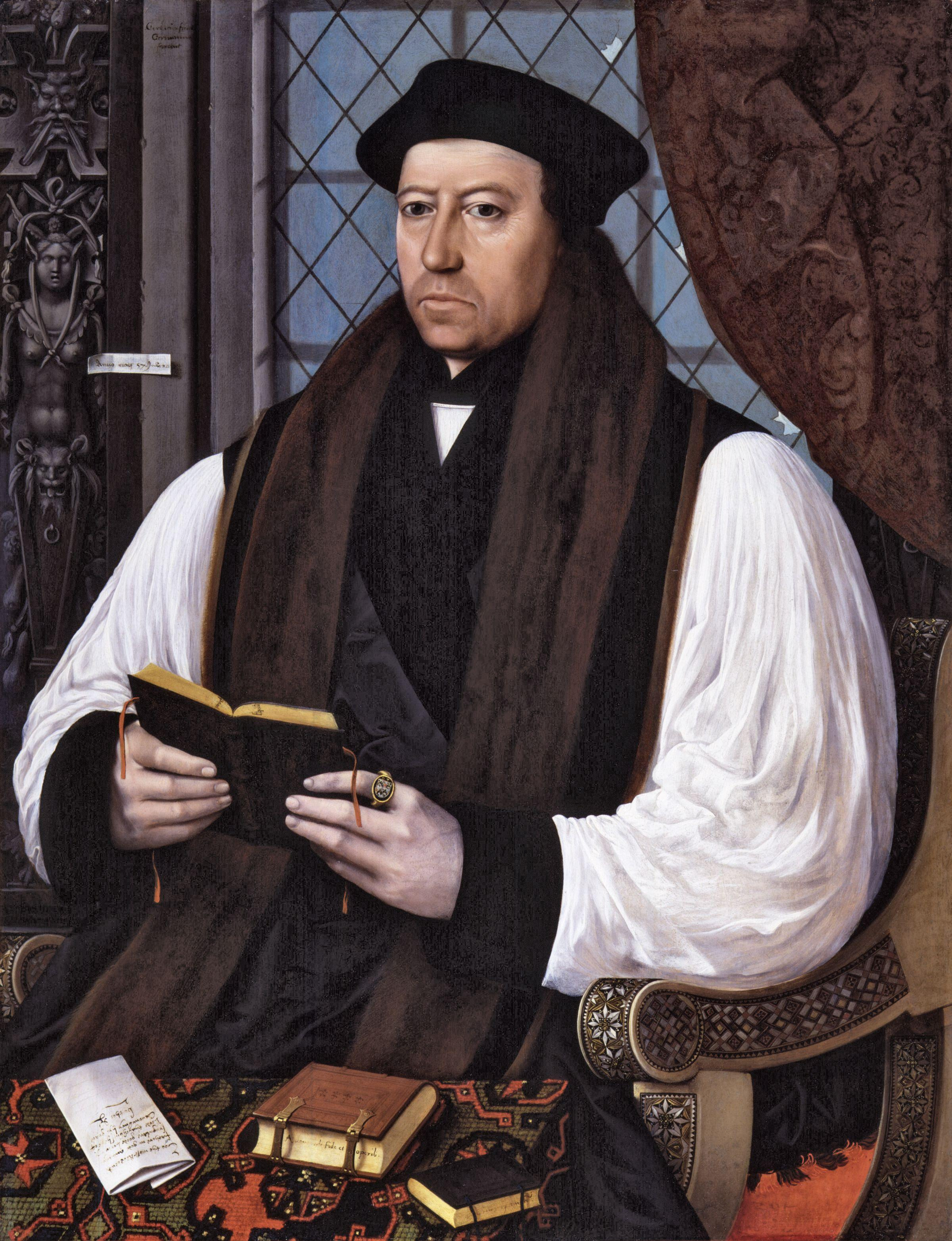
Thomas Cranmer, Archbishop of Canterbury, exerted a powerful influence on Edward's Protestantism.

In the matter of religion, the regime of Northumberland followed the same policy as that of Somerset, supporting an increasingly vigorous programme of reform. Edward VI's practical influence on government was limited, but his intense Protestantism made a reforming administration obligatory; his succession was managed by the reforming faction, who continued in power throughout his reign. Historians emphasize Edward VI's significant role in advancing Protestant reforms. According to historian Diarmaid MacCulloch, the young king was deeply interested in religious debates and endorsed measures that dismantled remaining Catholic practices. The introduction of the 1552 Book of Common Prayer under his reign marked a decisive move toward Protestant uniformity. The man Edward trusted most, Thomas Cranmer, Archbishop of Canterbury, introduced a series of religious reforms that revolutionised the English church from one that – while rejecting papal supremacy – remained essentially Catholic to one that was institutionally Protestant. The confiscation of church property that had begun under Henry VIII resumed under Edward – notably with the dissolution of the chantries – to the great monetary advantage of the crown and the new owners of the seized property. Church reform was therefore as much a political as a religious policy under Edward VI. By the end of his reign, the church had been financially ruined, with much of the bishops' property transferred into lay hands.

The religious convictions of both Somerset and Northumberland have proved elusive for historians, who are divided on the sincerity of their Protestantism. There is less doubt about the religious fervour of Edward, who was said to have read 12 chapters of scripture daily and enjoyed sermons, and was commemorated by John Foxe as a "godly imp". Edward was depicted during his life and afterwards as a new Josiah, the biblical king who destroyed the idols of Baal. He could be priggish in his anti-Catholicism and once asked Catherine Parr to persuade Lady Mary "to attend no longer to foreign dances and merriments which do not become a most Christian princess". But Edward's biographer Jennifer Loach cautions against accepting too readily the pious image of Edward handed down by the reformers, as in Foxe's influential Acts and Monuments, where a woodcut depicts the young king listening to a sermon by Hugh Latimer. In the early part of his life, Edward conformed to the prevailing Catholic practices, including attendance at mass, but he became convinced, under the influence of Cranmer and the reformers among his tutors and courtiers, that "true" religion should be imposed in England.

The English Reformation advanced under pressure from two directions: from the traditionalists on the one hand and the zealots on the other, who led incidents of iconoclasm (image-smashing) and complained that reform did not go far enough. Cranmer set himself the task of writing a uniform liturgy in English, detailing all weekly and daily services and religious festivals, to be made compulsory in the first Act of Uniformity of 1549. The Book of Common Prayer of 1549, intended as a compromise, was attacked by traditionalists for dispensing with many cherished rituals of the liturgy, such as the elevation of the bread and wine, (Note: One of the grievances of the western prayer-book rebels in 1549 was that the new service seemed "like a Christmas game".) while some reformers complained about the retention of too many "popish" elements, including vestiges of sacrificial rites at communion. Many senior Catholic clerics, including Bishops Stephen Gardiner of Winchester and Edmund Bonner of London, also opposed the prayer book. Both were imprisoned in the Tower and, along with others, deprived of their sees. In 1549, over 5,500 people died in the Prayer Book Rebellion in Devon and Cornwall.

Reformed doctrines were made official, such as justification by faith alone and communion for laity as well as clergy in both kinds, of bread and wine. The Ordinal of 1550 replaced the divine ordination of priests with a government-run appointment system, authorising ministers to preach the gospel and administer the sacraments rather than, as before, "to offer sacrifice and celebrate mass both for the living and the dead".

After 1551, the Reformation advanced further, with the approval and encouragement of Edward, who began to exert more personal influence in his role as Supreme Head of the church. The new changes were also a response to criticism from such reformers as John Hooper, Bishop of Gloucester, and the Scot John Knox, who was employed as a minister in Newcastle upon Tyne under the Duke of Northumberland and whose preaching at court prompted the king to oppose kneeling at communion. Cranmer was also influenced by the views of the continental reformer Martin Bucer, who died in England in 1551; by Peter Martyr, who was teaching at Oxford; and by other foreign theologians. The Reformation's progress was further speeded by the consecration of more reformers as bishops. (Note: Notable among the new bishops were John Ponet, who succeeded Gardiner at Winchester, Myles Coverdale at Exeter, and John Hooper at Gloucester.) In the winter of 1551–52, Cranmer rewrote the Book of Common Prayer in less ambiguous reformist terms, revised canon law and prepared a doctrinal statement, the Forty-two Articles, to clarify the practice of the reformed religion, particularly in the divisive matter of the communion service. Cranmer's formulation of the reformed religion, finally divesting the communion service of any notion of the real presence of God in the bread and the wine, effectively abolished the mass. According to Elton, the publication of Cranmer's revised prayer book in 1552, supported by a second Act of Uniformity, "marked the arrival of the English Church at Protestantism". (Note: "The Prayer Book of 1552, the Ordinal of 1550, which it took over, the act of uniformity which made the Prayer Book the only legal form of worship, and the Forty-two Articles binding upon all Englishmen, clerical and lay—these between them comprehended the protestant Reformation in England.") The prayer book of 1552 remains the foundation of the Church of England's services. But Cranmer was unable to implement all these reforms once it became clear in spring 1553 that Edward, upon whom the whole Reformation in England depended, was dying. (Note: Edward approved the Forty-two Articles in June 1553, too late for them to be introduced—they later became the basis of Elizabeth I's Thirty-nine Articles of 1563. Cranmer's revision of canon law, Reformatio Legum Ecclesiasticarum, was never authorised by king or parliament.)

== Betrothal ==
After the Rough Wooing and Thomas Seymour's plan to marry him off to Lady Jane Grey, the 13-year-old King was betrothed to the five-year-old Elisabeth of Valois, daughter of Henry II of France and Catherine de' Medici, in 1550. The marriage alliance was negotiated in secrecy, although Pope Julius III became aware of the plan and threatened to excommunicate both Henry and Elisabeth if the marriage went forward. A dowry of 200,000 écus was agreed to, but was never paid due to Edward's death before marriage. Elisabeth later married his sister Mary's widower, Philip II of Spain.

== Death and succession crisis ==
=== Devise for the succession ===
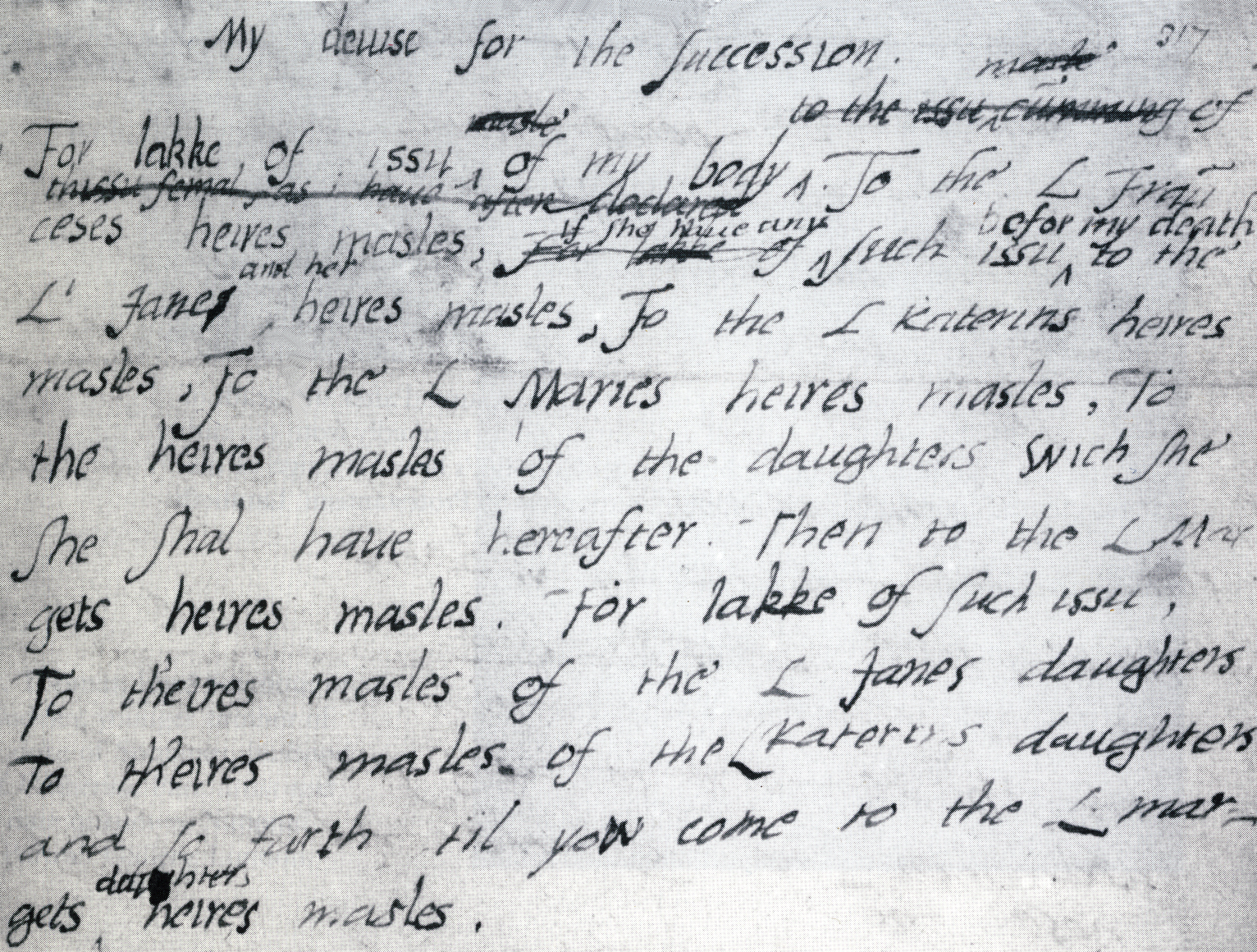
In his "devise for the succession", Edward passed over his sisters' claims to the throne in favour of Lady Jane Grey. In the fourth line, he altered "L Janes heires masles" to "L Jane and her heires masles" (Lady Jane and her male heirs). Inner Temple Library, London

In February 1553, Edward became ill, and by June, after several improvements and relapses, he was in a hopeless condition. The king's death and the succession of his Catholic half-sister Mary would jeopardise the English Reformation, and Edward's council and officers had many reasons to fear it. Edward himself opposed Mary's succession, not only on religious grounds but also on those of legitimacy and male inheritance, which also applied to Elizabeth. He composed a draft document, headed "My devise for the succession", in which he undertook to change the succession, most probably inspired by his father's precedent. He passed over the claims of his half-sisters and settled the Crown on his first cousin once removed, the 16-year-old Lady Jane Grey, who on 25 May 1553 had married Lord Guilford Dudley, a younger son of the Duke of Northumberland. In the document he writes:

My devise for the Succession

1. For lakke of issu [masle inserted above the line, but afterwards crossed out] of my body [to the issu (masle above the line) cumming of thissu femal, as i have after declared inserted, but crossed out]. To the L Franceses heires masles, [For lakke of erased] [if she have any inserted] such issu [befor my death inserted] to the L' Janes [and her inserted] heires masles, To the L Katerins heires masles, To the L Maries heires masles, To the heires masles of the daughters wich she shal haue hereafter. Then to the L Margets heires masles. For lakke of such issu, To th'eires masles of the L Janes daughters. To th'eires masles of the L Katerins daughters, and so forth til yow come to the L Margets [daughters inserted] heires masles.

2. If after my death theire masle be entred into 18 yere old, then he to have the hole rule and gouernauce therof.

3. But if he be under 18, then his mother to be gouuernres til he entre 18 yere old, But to doe nothing w'out th'auise (and agremet inserted) of 6 parcel of a counsel to be pointed by my last will to the nombre of 20.

4. If the mother die befor th'eire entre into 18 the realme to be gouuerned by the cousel Prouided that after he be 14 yere al great matters of importaunce be opened to him.

5. If i died w'out issu, and there were none heire masle, then the L Fraunces to be (reget altered to) gouuernres. For lakke of her, the her eldest daughters,4 and for lakke of them the L Marget to be gouuernres after as is aforsaid, til sume heire masle be borne, and then the mother of that child to be gouuernres.

6. And if during the rule of the gouuernres ther die 4 of the counsel, then shal she by her letters cal an asseble of the counsel w'in on month folowing and chose 4 more, wherin she shal haue thre uoices. But after her death the 16 shal chose emong themselfes til th'eire come to (18 erased) 14 yeare olde, and then he by ther aduice shal chose them" (1553).

— Edward VI, Devise for the Succession

In his document Edward provided, in case of "lack of issue of my body", for the succession of male heirs only – those of Lady Jane Grey's mother, Frances Grey, Duchess of Suffolk; of Jane herself; or of her sisters Katherine, Lady Herbert, and Lady Mary. (Note: In case there were no male heirs at the time of his death, England should have no king, but the Duchess of Suffolk should act as regent until the birth of a royal male. Edward made detailed provisions for a minority rule, stipulated at what age the male rulers were to take power, and left open the possibility of his having children.) As his death approached, and possibly persuaded by Northumberland, he altered the wording so that Jane and her sisters themselves could succeed. Yet Edward conceded their right only as an exception to male rule, demanded by reality, an example not to be followed if Jane and her sisters had only daughters. (Note: By the logic of the devise, Frances Grey, Duchess of Suffolk, Jane's mother and Henry VIII's niece, should have been named as Edward's heir, but she, who had already been passed over in favour of her children in Henry's will, seems to have waived her claim after a visit to Edward.) In the final document both Mary and Elizabeth were excluded because of bastardy; since both had been declared bastards under Henry VIII and never made legitimate again, this reason could be advanced for both. The provisions to alter the succession directly contravened Henry VIII's Third Succession Act of 1544 and have been described as bizarre and illogical.

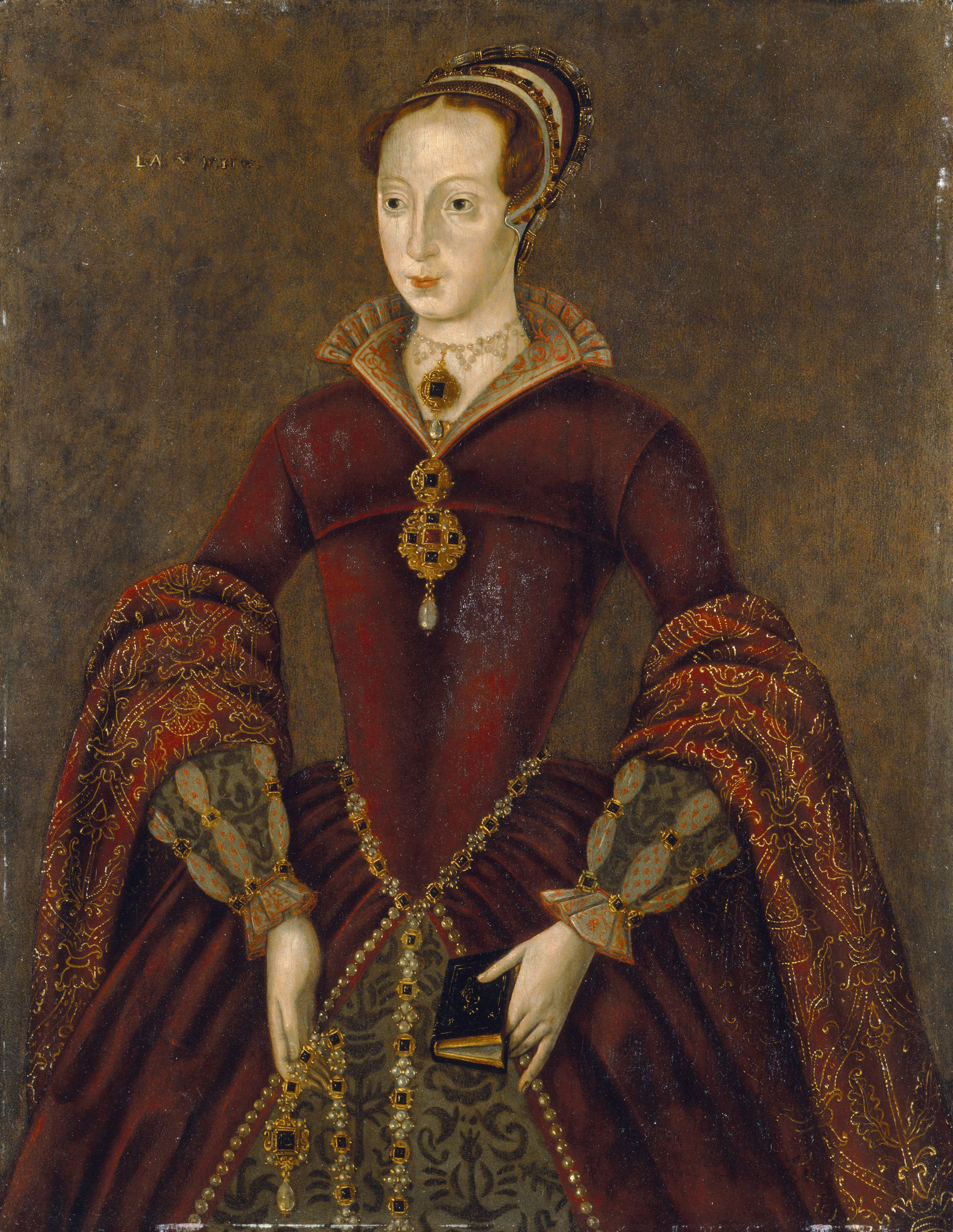
Lady Jane Grey was proclaimed queen four days after Edward's death.

In early June, Edward personally supervised the drafting of a clean version of his devise by lawyers, to which he lent his signature "in six several places." On 15 June, he summoned high-ranking judges to his sickbed, commanding them on their allegiance "with sharp words and angry countenance" to prepare his devise as letters patent and announcing that he would have these passed in Parliament. His next measure was to have leading councillors and lawyers sign a bond in his presence, in which they agreed to perform Edward's will faithfully after his death. A few months later, Chief Justice Edward Montagu recalled that when he and his colleagues had raised legal objections to the devise, Northumberland had threatened them "trembling for anger, and ... further said that he would fight in his shirt with any man in that quarrel". Montagu also overheard a group of lords standing behind him conclude "if they refused to do that, they were traitors". At last, on 21 June, the devise was signed by over 100 notables, including councillors, peers, archbishops, bishops and sheriffs; many of them later said they had been bullied into doing so by Northumberland, although in the words of Edward's biographer Jennifer Loach, "few of them gave any clear indication of reluctance at the time".

It was now common knowledge that Edward was dying, and foreign diplomats suspected that some scheme to debar Mary was under way. France found the prospect of the emperor's cousin on the English throne disagreeable and engaged in secret talks with Northumberland, indicating support. The diplomats were certain that the overwhelming majority of the English people backed Mary, but nevertheless believed that Queen Jane would be successfully established.

For centuries, the attempt to alter the succession was mostly seen as a one-man plot by the Duke of Northumberland. But since the 1970s, many historians have attributed the inception of the "devise" and the insistence on its implementation to the king's initiative. Diarmaid MacCulloch has made out Edward's "teenage dreams of founding an evangelical realm of Christ", while David Starkey has written that "Edward had a couple of co-operators, but the driving will was his". Among other members of the Privy Chamber, Northumberland's intimate Sir John Gates has been suspected of suggesting to Edward to change his devise so that Lady Jane Grey herself – not just any sons of hers – could inherit the Crown. Whatever the degree of his contribution, Edward was convinced that his word was law and fully endorsed disinheriting his half-sisters: "barring Mary from the succession was a cause in which the young King believed".

=== Illness and death ===
Edward had become ill in January 1553 with a fever and cough that gradually worsened. The imperial ambassador, Jean Scheyfve, reported, "he suffers a good deal when the fever is upon him, especially from a difficulty in drawing his breath, which is due to the compression of the organs on the right side".

Edward felt well enough in early April to take the air in the park at Westminster and to move to Greenwich, but by the end of the month he had weakened again. By 7 May he was "much amended", and the royal doctors had no doubt of his recovery. A few days later the king was watching the ships on the Thames, sitting at his window. But he relapsed, and on 11 June, Scheyfve, who had an informant in the king's household, reported, "the matter he ejects from his mouth is sometimes coloured a greenish yellow and black, sometimes pink, like the colour of blood". Now his doctors believed he was suffering from "a suppurating tumour" of the lung and that his life was beyond recovery. Soon, his legs became so swollen that he had to lie on his back, and he lost the strength to resist the disease. To his tutor John Cheke he whispered, "I am glad to die".

Edward made his final appearance in public on 1 July, when he showed himself at his window in Greenwich Palace, horrifying those who saw him by his "thin and wasted" condition. During the next two days, large crowds arrived hoping to see the King again, but on 3 July, they were told that the weather was too chilly for him to appear. Edward died at Greenwich Palace at 8 pm on 6 July 1553, aged 15. According to John Foxe's account of his death, his last words were: "I am faint; Lord have mercy upon me, and take my spirit".

Edward was buried on 8 August immediately to the west of his grandfather Henry VII's tomb in the Lady Chapel at Westminster Abbey, right under the Chapel's original altar, with reformed rites performed by Thomas Cranmer. The procession was led by "a grett company of chylderyn in ther surples" and watched by Londoners "wepyng and lamenting"; the funeral chariot, draped in cloth of gold, was topped by an effigy of Edward, with crown, sceptre, and garter. A monument was designed but not realised, leaving Edward's burial place unmarked until 1966, when an inscribed stone was laid in the chapel floor by Christ's Hospital school to commemorate its founder. The inscription reads: "In Memory Of King Edward VI Buried In This Chapel This Stone Was Placed Here By Christ's Hospital In Thanksgiving For Their Founder 7 October 1966".

The cause of Edward VI's death is not certain. As with many royal deaths in the 16th century, rumours of poisoning abounded, but no evidence has been found to support them. The Duke of Northumberland, whose unpopularity was underlined by the events that followed Edward's death, was widely believed to have ordered the imagined poisoning. Another theory held that Edward had been poisoned by Catholics seeking to bring Mary to the throne. The surgeon who opened Edward's chest after his death found that "the disease whereof his majesty died was the disease of the lungs". The Venetian ambassador Giacomo Soranzo reported that Edward had died of consumption – in other words, tuberculosis – a diagnosis many historians accept. Skidmore believes that Edward contracted tuberculosis after a bout of measles and smallpox in 1552 that suppressed his natural immunity to the disease. Loach suggests instead that his symptoms were typical of acute bronchopneumonia, leading to a "suppurating pulmonary infection" or lung abscess, septicaemia and kidney failure.

=== Lady Jane and Queen Mary ===
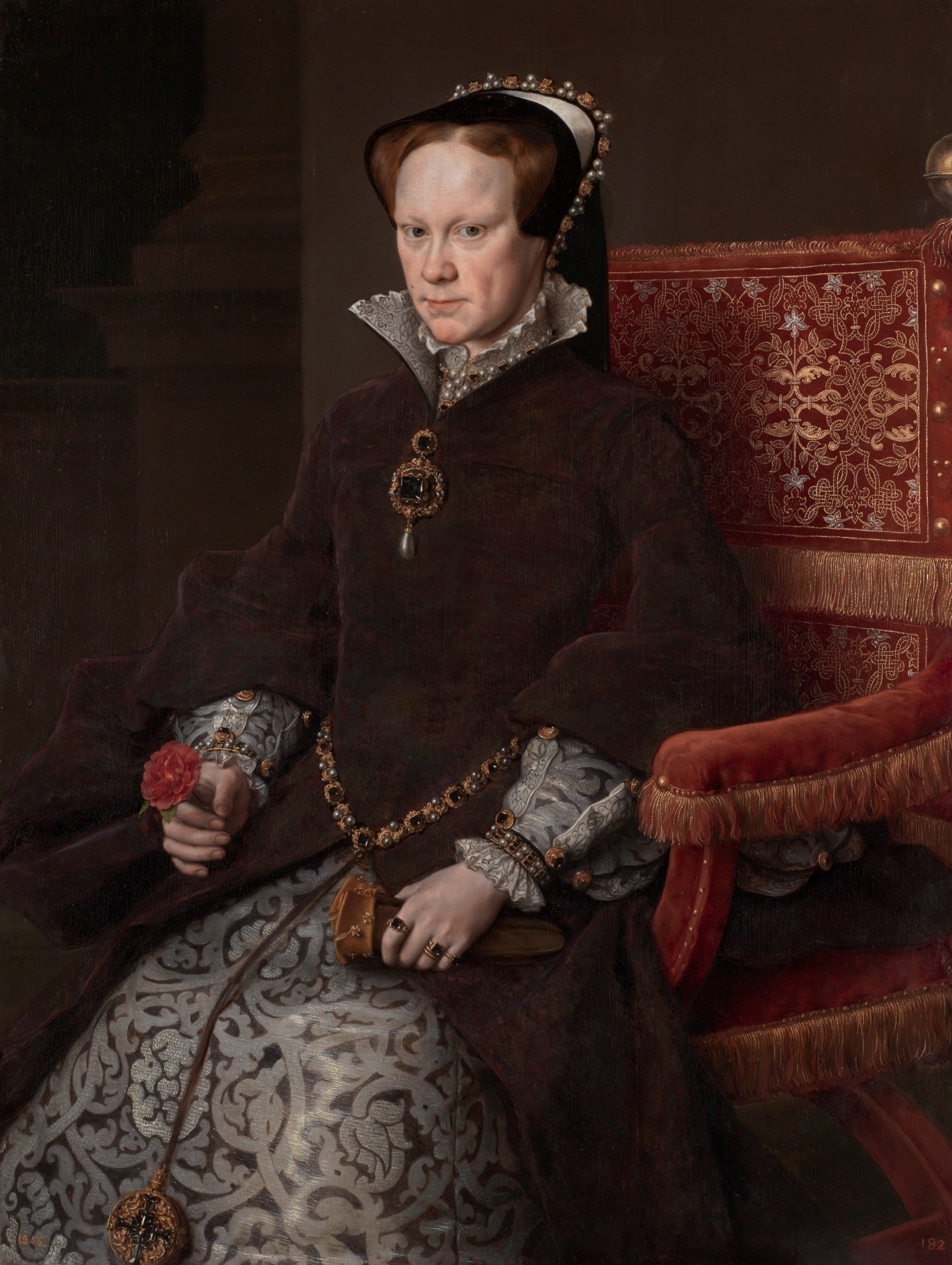
Two weeks after Edward's death, the Privy Council proclaimed his half-sister as Queen Mary I, despite Edward's attempt to prevent her accession.

Lady Mary was last seen by Edward in February and was kept informed about his health by Northumberland and through her contacts with the Imperial ambassadors. Aware of Edward's imminent death, she left Hunsdon House, near London, and sped to her estates around Kenninghall in Norfolk, where she could count on the support of her tenants. Northumberland sent ships to the Norfolk coast to prevent her escape or the arrival of reinforcements from the continent. He delayed the announcement of the King's death while he gathered his forces, and Jane Grey was taken to the Tower on 10 July. On the same day, she was proclaimed queen in the streets of London, to murmurings of discontent. The Privy Council received a message from Mary asserting her "right and title" to the throne and commanding that the council proclaim her queen, as she had already proclaimed herself. The council replied that Jane was queen by Edward's authority and that Mary, by contrast, was illegitimate and supported only by "a few lewd, base people".

Northumberland soon realised that he had miscalculated drastically, not least in failing to secure Mary's person before Edward's death. Although many of those who rallied to Mary were Catholics hoping to establish that religion and to defeat Protestantism, her supporters also included many for whom her lawful claim to the throne overrode religious considerations. Northumberland was obliged to relinquish control of a nervous council in London and launch an unplanned pursuit of Mary into East Anglia, from where news was arriving of her growing support, which included several nobles and gentlemen and "innumerable companies of the common people". On 14 July Northumberland marched out of London with 3,000 men, reaching Cambridge the next day; meanwhile, Mary rallied her forces at Framlingham Castle in Suffolk, gathering an army of nearly 20,000 by 19 July.

It now dawned on the Privy Council that it had made a terrible mistake. Led by the Earls of Arundel and Pembroke, on 19 July the council publicly proclaimed Mary as queen; Jane's nine-day reign came to an end. The proclamation triggered wild rejoicing throughout London. Stranded in Cambridge, Northumberland himself proclaimed Mary queen – as he had been commanded to do by a letter from the council. William Paget and the Earl of Arundel rode to Framlingham to beg Mary's pardon, and Arundel arrested Northumberland on 24 July. Northumberland was beheaded on 22 August, shortly after renouncing Protestantism. His recantation dismayed his daughter-in-law, Jane, who followed him to the scaffold on 12 February 1554, after her father's involvement in Wyatt's rebellion.

== Protestant legacy ==
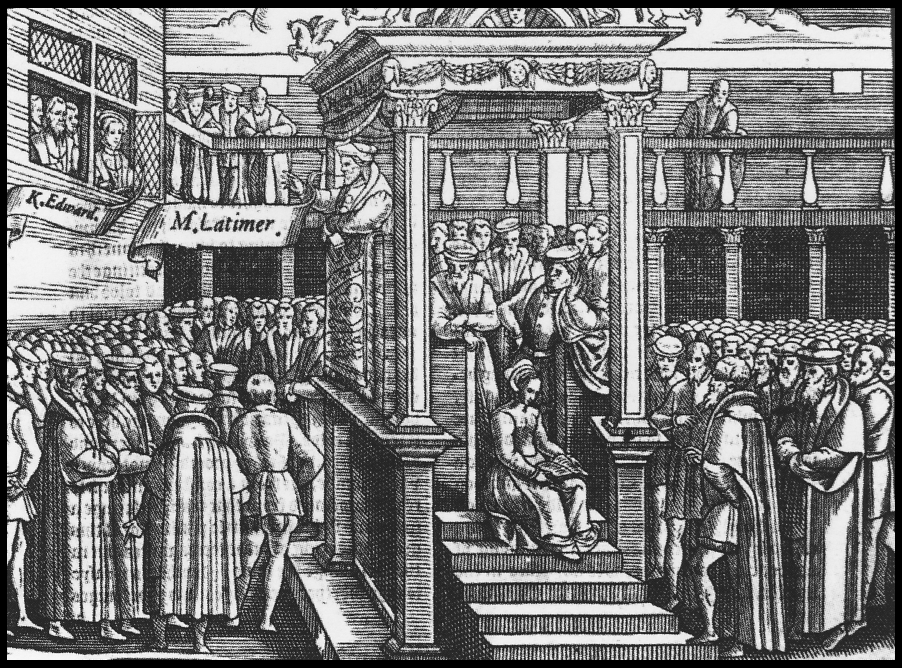
A contemporary woodcut of Hugh Latimer preaching to King Edward and his courtiers from a pulpit at the Palace of Whitehall. Published in John Foxe's Acts and Monuments in 1563.

Although Edward reigned for only six years and died at 15, his reign made a lasting contribution to the English Reformation and the structure of the Church of England. The last decade of Henry VIII's reign had seen a partial stalling of the Reformation, a drifting back to Catholic values. By contrast, Edward's reign saw radical progress in the Reformation, with the Church transferring from an essentially Catholic liturgy and structure to one usually identified as Protestant. (Note: The article follows the majority of historians in using the term "Protestant" for the Church of England as it stood by the end of Edward's reign. However, a minority prefer the terms "evangelical" or "new". In this view, as expressed by Diarmaid MacCulloch, it is "premature to use the label 'Protestant' for the English movement of reform in the reigns of Henry and Edward, even though its priorities were intimately related to what was happening in central Europe. A description more true to the period would be 'evangelical', a word which was indeed used at the time in various cognates".) In particular, the introduction of the Book of Common Prayer, the Ordinal of 1550 and Cranmer's Forty-two Articles formed the basis for English Church practices that continue to this day. Edward himself fully approved these changes, and though they were the work of reformers such as Thomas Cranmer, Hugh Latimer and Nicholas Ridley, backed by Edward's determinedly evangelical council, the fact of the king's religion was a catalyst in the acceleration of the Reformation during his reign.

Queen Mary's attempts to undo the reforming work of her brother's reign faced major obstacles. Despite her belief in papal supremacy, she ruled constitutionally as the Supreme Head of the English Church, a contradiction under which she bridled. She found herself entirely unable to restore the vast number of ecclesiastical properties handed over or sold to private landowners. She burned a number of leading Protestant churchmen, but many reformers either went into exile or remained subversively active in England during her reign, producing a torrent of reforming propaganda she was unable to stem. Still, Protestantism was not yet "printed in the stomachs" of the English people, and had Mary lived longer, her Catholic reconstruction might have succeeded, making Edward's reign, rather than hers, a historical aberration.

On Mary's death in 1558, the English Reformation resumed its course, and most of the reforms instituted during Edward's reign were reinstated in the Elizabethan Religious Settlement. Queen Elizabeth replaced Mary's councillors and bishops with ex-Edwardians, such as William Cecil, Northumberland's former secretary, and Richard Cox, Edward's old tutor, who preached an anti-Catholic sermon at the opening of Parliament in 1559. Parliament passed an Act of Uniformity the following spring that restored, with modifications, Cranmer's prayer book of 1552; and the Thirty-nine Articles of 1563 were largely based on Cranmer's Forty-two Articles. The theological developments of Edward's reign provided a vital source of reference for Elizabeth's religious policies, though the internationalism of the Edwardian Reformation was never revived.

== Family tree ==
Family of Edward VI

John Seymour c. 1474–1536	Margery Wentworth c. 1478–1550	Henry VII of England; 1457–1509 (Kingdom of England) 1485–1509	Elizabeth of York; 1466–1503
Edward Seymour; 1500–1552	Thomas Seymour c. 1508–1549	Jane Seymour c. 1508–1537	Henry VIII of England; 1491–1547 (Kingdom of England) 1509–1547	Other wives	Margaret Tudor; 1489–1541	Mary Tudor; 1496–1533
Edward VI of England; 1537–1553 (Kingdom of England) 1547–1553	Mary I of England; 1516–1558 (Kingdom of England) 1553–1558	Elizabeth I of England; 1533–1603 (Kingdom of England) 1558–1603	James V of Scotland; 1512–1542 (Kingdom of Scotland) 1513–1542	Frances Grey; 1517–1559
Mary, Queen of Scots; 1542–1587 (Kingdom of Scotland) 1542–1567	Jane Grey; 1537–1554
James VI and I 1566–1625 (Kingdom of Scotland) 1567–1625 (Kingdom of England) 1603–1625

== See also ==
- Cultural depictions of Edward VI

== Notes ==
Edward VI House of Tudor Born: 12 October 1537 Died: 6 July 1553
Regnal titles
Preceded by Henry VIII	King of England and Ireland; 1547–1553	Succeeded by Jane or Mary I
Peerage of England
Vacant Title last held by Henry VIII	Prince of Wales; 1537–1547	Vacant Title next held by Henry Frederick
Vacant Title last held by Henry Tudor (first son of Henry VIII)	Duke of Cornwall; 1537–1547	Vacant Title next held by Henry Frederick
