= List of ambassadors of the Holy Roman Empire to England =

This is a partial list of Imperial resident ambassadors to the Kingdom of England.

- Bernardo de Mesa, December 1514 (first sent by Ferdinand II of Aragon) – March 1523
- Louis of Praet, May 1522 – May 1525
- Jean de le Sauch, February 1525 – August 1525
- Jean Jonglet, July 1525 – July 1526
- George of Theimseke, July 1526 – January 1527
- Don Iñigo López de Mendoza y Zúñiga, December 1526 – June 1529
- Eustace Chapuys, September 1529 – March 1539
- Philippe Maioris, March 1539 – September 1540
- Eustace Chapuys, September 1540 – May 1545
- Ferrante Gonzaga, 1543-1543
- Beltrán de la Cueva, 3rd Duke of Alburquerque, 1544-1544
- François van der Delft, November 1544 – May/June 1550
- Jean Scheyfve, May 1550 – October 1553
- Simon Renard, June 1553 – May 1555

== See also ==
- List of ambassadors of Spain to England
- List of ambassadors of the Kingdom of England to the Holy Roman Emperor
