= Eustace Chapuys =

Savoyard diplomat

- Eustace Chapuys
- Born: c. 1489/90/92; Annecy, Duchy of Savoy, Holy Roman Empire (in modern France)
- Died: 21 January 1556 (63-67 years of age); Leuven, Duchy of Brabant, Holy Roman Empire (in modern Belgium)
- Resting place: Chapel of the College of Savoy; 50.878333°N 4.704722°E
- Title: Imperial ambassador to the court of Henry VIII
- Predecessor: Íñigo López de Mendoza y Zúñiga
- Successor: François van der Delft
- Children: Césare
- Parent(s): Louis Chapuys; Guigonne Dupuys

Eustace Chapuys ([østas ʃapɥi]; c. 1489/90/92 – 21 January 1556) was a Savoyard diplomat and priest who served as Imperial ambassador to England from 1529 until 1545 under Charles V. He is best known for the extensive and detailed correspondence he wrote about the life of the court of Henry VIII immediately preceding and during the English Reformation.

== Early life and education ==
Eustace Chapuys was the second son, and one of six children, of Louis Chapuys, a notary and syndic, and Guigonne Dupuys, who may have been of noble birth. It was believed that he was born between 1490 and 1492 in Annecy, then in the Duchy of Savoy, however his biographer, Lauren Mackay, has argued that this is far too late, and that it was more likely to be 1489. This would make him a more plausible eighteen years old when he entered university in 1507. Chapuys began his education at Annecy and from 1507, attended the University of Turin, where he remained for at least five years. Around 1512, having chosen law as a career, he continued his studies at the University of Valence. In early 1515, he attended the Sapienza University of Rome, where he attained the degree of doctor of civil and canon laws, and received the Pope's blessing.

Chapuys was a humanist and acted as both friend, correspondent and patron to men of similar interests. He enjoyed the friendship of the Annecy humanists Claude Blancherose and Claude Dieudonné, the German Heinrich Cornelius Agrippa, and the English Thomas More and John Fisher. He corresponded with Erasmus, with whom he shared a deep mutual respect and admiration, although they never met.

== Career ==
Between 1515 and 1517, Chapuys was ordained and in July 1517, he was made a canon of the cathedral at Geneva and dean of Viry. In August 1517, he became an official of the diocese of Geneva, deputising for the bishop, John of Savoy, a cousin of the Duke of Savoy, in the episcopal court and subsequently served the Duke of Savoy and Charles de Bourbon. In 1522, he was granted the deanery of Vuillonnex.

By August 1526, he was the Duke of Bourbon's ambassador to Charles V's court in Granada and he first visited England in September 1526. In the summer of 1527, following the death of the Duke of Bourbon at the sack of Rome, he entered the service of Charles V, Holy Roman Emperor, working under Nicholas Perrenot, seigneur de Granvelle. He held the positions of councillor and master of requests by July 1527, and at Valladolid on 25 June 1529, he was appointed Charles V's ambassador to England.

=== Ambassador to England ===
After going to Savoy as ambassador, Chapuys arrived in England, in late August 1529, to take over the post of resident ambassador from Don Íñigo de Mendoza, a post that had been rather unstably occupied since the forced withdrawal of Louis of Praet in 1525. He was to remain in the post from 1529 until 1545, except for brief absences from 1539 to 1540, and in 1542. He lived in Austin Friars, a neighbour to Thomas Cromwell ("Master Secretary" to King Henry VIII) in what later became Drapers' Hall. Apart from Cromwell, whom he came to consider a friend, Chapuys cultivated religiously conservative ("anti-heretical") noblemen in the king's court as his informants.

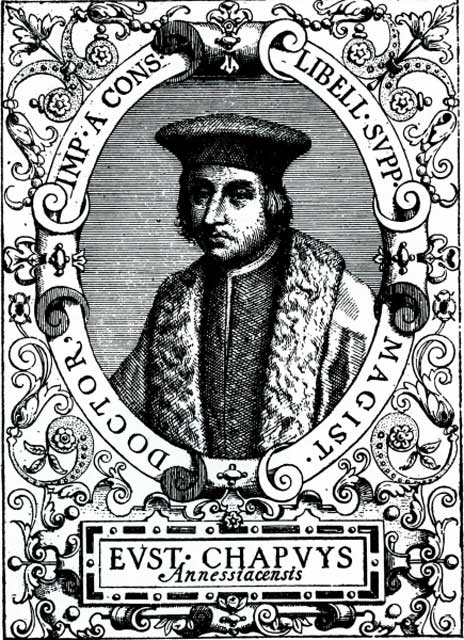

Chapuys's legal background made him an ideal candidate to defend the king's wife Catherine of Aragon, who was also an aunt of Emperor Charles V, against the legal proceedings, known at the time as the "King's Great Matter", which led eventually to the English rejection of papal authority and break from the Roman Catholic Church. Catherine had specifically requested Chapuys as a replacement for Mendoza, because of his legal expertise and his proficiency in Latin.

Chapuys's attempts to defeat English machinations against Catherine eventually failed and Henry married Anne Boleyn. Catherine died in January 1536. It has been traditionally thought that Chapuys despised Anne and could never bring himself to say her name, referring to her only as the "whore" or "concubine". Eric Ives, however, suggests that the ambassador's use of the term was not from his disdain for Anne but because he failed to appreciate that she could ever become Henry's wife.

Chapuys was a faithful servant to Charles V, an astute observer of men, and although he spoke and wrote fluently in French, he was a staunch opponent of France and the French, whom he loathed because of their designs on his homeland, Savoy. On one occasion, he threatened to disinherit his niece if she married a Frenchman.

Although it was to support Catherine in her cause that he first came to England, it was her daughter, Mary, to whom he rendered the greater service. Chapuys, who had been devoted to Catherine, strongly disapproved of the king's treatment of his daughter. He cultivated relationships with some of Mary's closest supporters, including Gertrude Courtenay, Marchioness of Exeter, who passed him information and secretly visited him in disguise. Chapuys developed an affection for Mary, who trusted him and relied on him during some of the most difficult years of her life.

In 1539, Chapuys began to suffer from gout. Nevertheless, he remained as resident ambassador in England, except for brief absences, keeping his master informed on English affairs, until May 1545. He was recalled to Antwerp, in April 1539, when diplomatic relations soured, where he remained until July 1540. On his return, he worked to restore Anglo-Imperial relations and was involved in the negotiations for the alliance of February 1543, which led to Henry VIII and Charles V declaring war on France. Chapuys accompanied Henry VIII's men to France. His health had continued to worsen in 1544 and he asked to be relieved of his post, but the Emperor allowed him to leave only after introducing his successor, François van der Delft, to the post.

On 4 May 1546, Chapuys came to Greenwich Palace for his final audience with Catherine Parr and Princess Mary. after taking his leave with Henry VIII, Chapuys left England. Chapuys was then sent to Bourbourg, near Gravelines, to negotiate until July 1545, when he was finally released from service.

== Later years ==
After his retirement, Chapuys resided in Leuven, in the Low Countries, now Belgium and was, by 1545, a man of considerable wealth. His income was derived from his ambassadorial pensions, the inheritance of an estate at Annecy, and various ecclesiastical sinecures, which included the deanery at Vuillonnex, canonries at Toledo, Osma and Málaga, ecclesiastical posts in Flanders and the profitable abbacy of Sant'Angelo di Brolo in Sicily, which he acquired in 1545. He had increased his wealth over the years through prudent investments in Antwerp.

Chapuys used his wealth to set up a college in May 1548, for promising students from his native Savoy. This College of Savoy, in Leuven, of which now only the gateway survives, is incorporated into M – Museum Leuven, the city's museum. He also founded a grammar school at Annecy in December 1551.

During his retirement, Chapuys acted as an advisor to Charles V between 1547 and 1549. According to C.S.L. Davies, "His last known state paper is an acute analysis of the political situation" as Henry VIII was dying in January 1547. He was subsequently asked to recall his negotiations, and the previous attitude of the regime of Henry VIII, on the issue of the betrothal of Mary I. In his reply, he wrote he was uncertain of the possibility of convincing John Dudley to agree to any proposed marriage. At the end of the letter, Chapuys wrote that Mary had "no other desire or hope than to be bestowed at the hands of your majesty." He felt nothing was more fond in Mary's mind than marriage.

Chapuys had a son, Césare, who was made legitimate in 1545, and who died in 1549. The death of his son ensured that the college and grammar school that he had founded would benefit from his vast fortune on his own demise. In 1555 he decided that his English pension should go towards setting up a scholarship for English students at Leuven.

== Death ==
Eustace Chapuys died on 21 January 1556 and was buried in the chapel of the College of Savoy. A portrait of Chapuys, which may be contemporary, is located at the musée-château d'Annecy at Annecy.

== Fictional portrayals ==
- Chapuys appears as a character in William Shakespeare's play The Famous History of the Life of King Henry VIII under the name of Caputius.
- He is a major character in Robert Bolt's play A Man for All Seasons, though he is excised from the film version.
- Chapuys is portrayed by Edward Atienza in The Six Wives of Henry VIII.
- Chapuys, portrayed by Anthony Brophy, is a supporting character in all four seasons of BBC/Showtime's series The Tudors where he is depicted (accurately) as a staunch supporter of Catherine of Aragon who openly despised Anne Boleyn. He develops a strong, protective friendship with Mary Tudor before leaving England and is shown as dying much earlier than he did in real life.
- He has a prominent role in Hilary Mantel's Wolf Hall, Bring Up the Bodies and The Mirror & the Light; the novelist uses Chapuys's insights (taken from his real-life dispatches) to shape readers' perceptions. He was portrayed in the television adaptations by Mathieu Amalric in Wolf Hall and by Karim Kadjar in Wolf Hall: The Mirror and the Light.
- Chapuys's role in Henry VIII's reign is dramatised in David Starkey's documentary, Henry VIII: Mind of A Tyrant. He is portrayed by actor Andrew Havill.

== Sources ==
- "Calendar of State Papers, Spain". British-history.ac.uk.
- Davies, C. S. L. (2008). "Chapuys, Eustache". Oxford Dictionary of National Biography (online ed.). Oxford University Press. doi:10.1093/ref:odnb/70785. (Subscription, Wikipedia Library access or UK public library membership required.)
- Erickson, Carolly (1998). Bloody Mary: the life of Mary Tudor. New York: St. Martin's Griffin. ISBN 0-312-18706-8.
- Fernández-Armesto, Felipe (1985). "Eustache Chapuys of Annecy". In Bietenholz, Peter G.; Deutscher, Thomas Brian (eds.). Contemporaries of Erasmus: A Biographical Register of the Renaissance and Reformation. Vol. 1. Toronto: University of Toronto Press. pp. 293–295. ISBN 9780802025074.
- "Henry VIII: May 1536, 16-20". Letters and Papers, Foreign and Domestic, Henry VIII. Vol. 10: January–June 1536. British-history.ac.uk. 1887. pp. 371–391.
- "Introduction". Calendar of State Papers, Spain. Vol. 4. British-history.ac.uk. 1879. pp. i–xxviii.
- Jokinen, Anniina (5 May 2009). "Eustace Chapuys (c.1490-1556)". Luminarium.org.
- Lindsey, Karen (1995). Divorced, Beheaded, Survived: Feminist Reinterpretation of the Wives of Henry VIII. Cambridge: Da Capo Press. ISBN 0-201-40823-6.
- Lundell, Richard (2001), The Mask of Dissimulation: Eustace Chapuys and Early Modern Diplomatic Technique: 1536-1545 (Ph.D. Thesis), Urbana-Champaign: University of Illinois
- Lundell, Richard (2012). "Renaissance Diplomacy and the Limits of Empire: Eustace Chapuys, Habsburg Imperialisms, and Dissimulation as Method". In Andrade, Tonio; Reger, William (eds.). The Limits of Empire: European Imperial Formations in Early Modern World History: Essays in Honor of Geoffrey Parker. Farnham. ISBN 9781409471141.
- Lunitz, Martin (1988). Diplomatie und Diplomaten im 16. Jahrhundert. Konstanz: Hartung-Gorre Verlag.
- Mackay, Lauren (2014). Inside the Tudor Court: Henry VIII and his Six Wives through the writings of the Spanish Ambassador, Eustace Chapuys (hardback). Stroud: Amberley. ISBN 9781445609577.
- Porter, Linda (2007). Mary Tudor: The First Queen. London: Piatkus. ISBN 978-0-7499-0982-6.
- Whitelock, Anna (2010). Mary Tudor: England's First Queen. London: Bloomsbury. ISBN 9781408800782.
