= Thomas Boleyn, 1st Earl of Wiltshire =

English noble and diplomat (c. 1477–1539)

The Right Honourable The Earl of Wiltshire and Ormond KG, KB
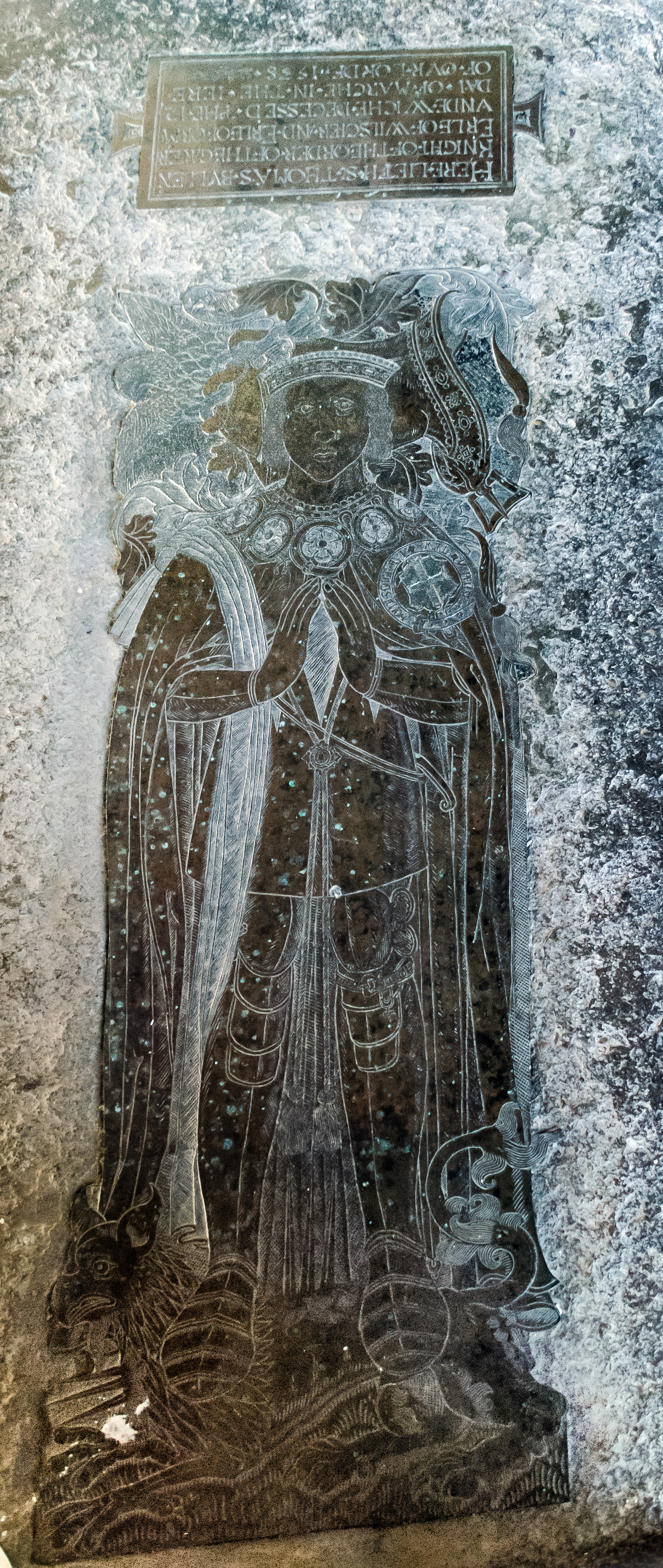
- Monumental brass to Thomas Boleyn, St Peter's Church, Hever

Lord Privy Seal
- In office 1530–1536
- Monarch: Henry VIII
- Preceded by: Cuthbert Tunstall
- Succeeded by: Sir Thomas Cromwell

Treasurer of the Household
- In office 1521–1525
- Monarch: Henry VIII
- Preceded by: Sir Edward Poynings
- Succeeded by: Sir William FitzWilliam

Personal details
- Born: Thomas Boleyn c. 1477 Hever Castle, Kent, England
- Died: 12 March 1539 (aged 61–62) Hever Castle, Kent, England
- Resting place: St. Peter's Church, Hever, Kent, United Kingdom; 51°11′02″N 0°06′41″E
- Spouse: Elizabeth Howard
- Children: Thomas Boleyn; Lady Mary Stafford; Henry Boleyn; George Boleyn, Viscount Rochford; Anne, Queen of England
- Parents: Sir William Boleyn (father); Margaret Butler (mother)
- Occupation: Diplomat; politician

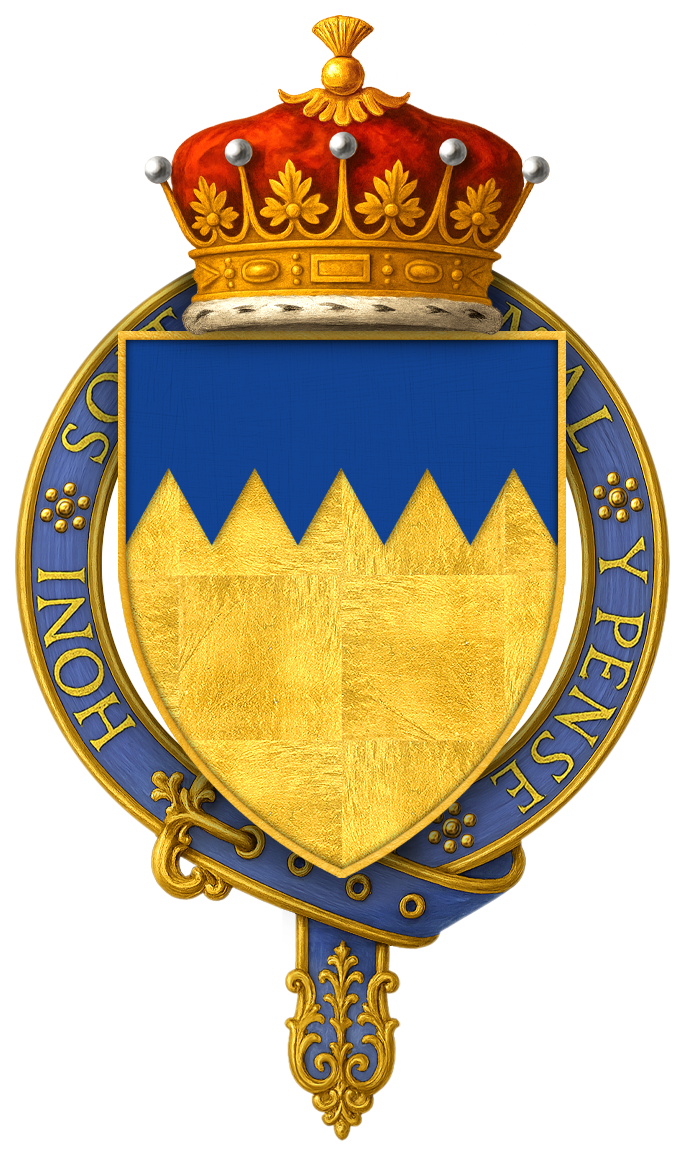
Arms adopted by Sir Thomas Boleyn, Earl of Wiltshire and Ormond, KG: Or, a chief indented azure, the ancient "Walter" arms of the Butler family, later Earls of Ormond, his maternal ancestors. As survives on his Garter stall plate in St George's Chapel, Windsor

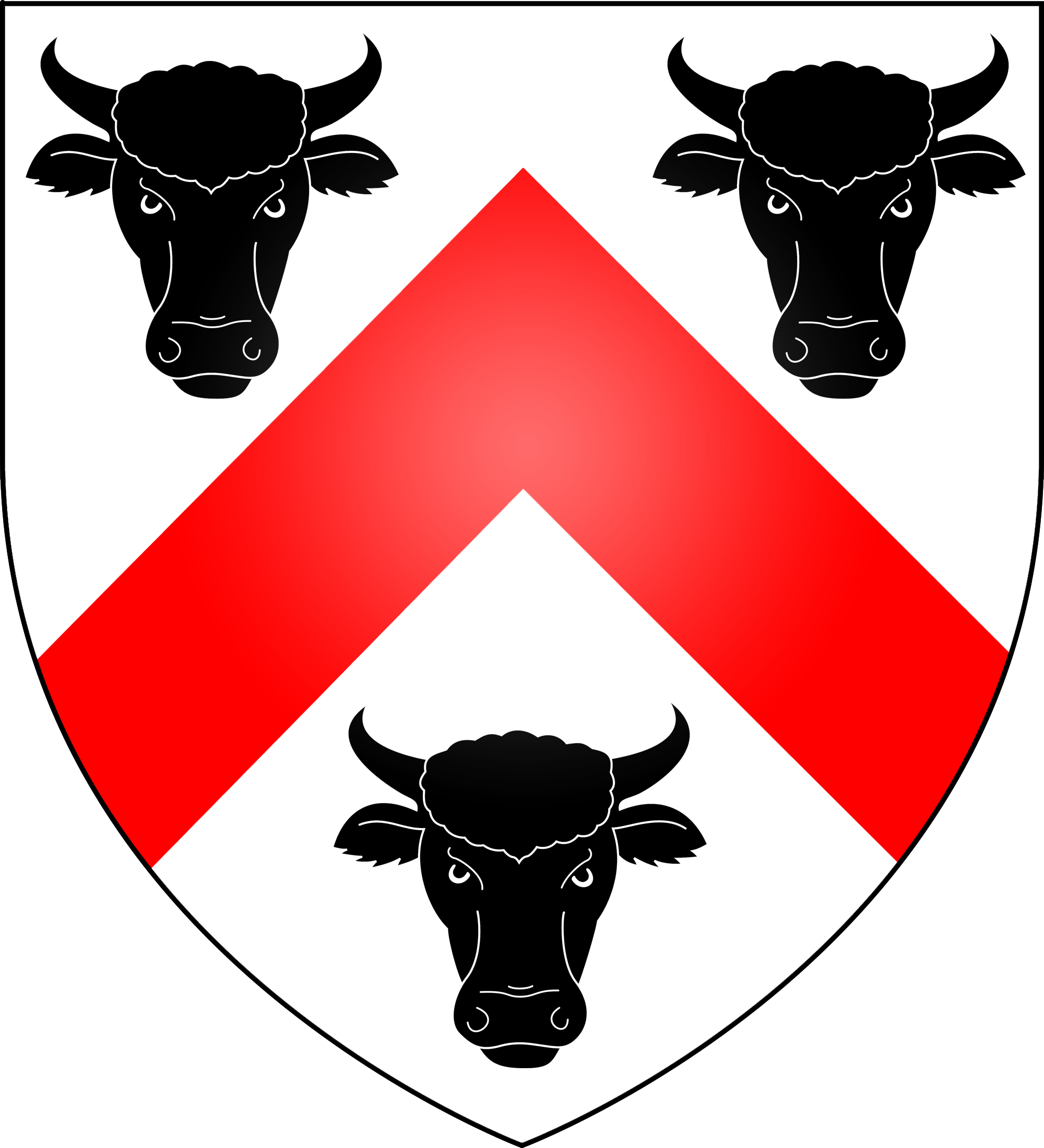
Paternal arms of Boleyn: Argent, a chevron gules between three bull's heads afrontée sable

Thomas Boleyn, 1st Earl of Wiltshire, 1st Earl of Ormond, 1st Viscount Rochford KG, KB (c. 1477 – 12 March 1539), of Hever Castle in Kent, was an English diplomat and politician. He was the father of Anne Boleyn, the second wife of King Henry VIII, and was thus the maternal grandfather of Queen Elizabeth I. By Henry VIII, he was made a Knight of the Garter in 1523 and was elevated to the peerage as Viscount Rochford in 1525, and in 1529, he was further ennobled as Earl of Wiltshire and Earl of Ormond.

== Origins ==
He was born in about 1477 at Hever Castle in Kent, the son of Sir William Boleyn of Blickling in Norfolk (purchased by Sir William's father Sir Geoffrey Boleyn, a wealthy mercer who served as Lord Mayor of London) by his wife Margaret Butler, a daughter and co-heiress of Thomas Butler, 7th Earl of Ormond.

== Marriage and issue ==
He married Elizabeth Howard, eldest daughter of Thomas Howard, Earl of Surrey, and Elizabeth Tilney. Five children are attested, only three of whom survived childhood:

- Thomas Boleyn (1496 - 1506) died young, possibly of sweating sickness;
- Mary Boleyn (c. 1499 – 19 July 1543); Mary Carey (1520–1528); Mary Stafford (1534–1543); Mary's second husband, William Stafford, was knighted in 1545 – two years after his wife's death in 1543;
- Henry Boleyn (1500 - 1506) died young, possibly of sweating sickness;
- George Boleyn, Viscount Rochford (c.1504 - 17 May 1536), only surviving son and heir apparent who predeceased his father, having been executed in 1536 together with his sister the queen. From 1529, he used his father's junior title of Viscount Rochford as a courtesy title;
- Anne Boleyn (c. 1501 or 1507 – 19 May 1536), Marquess of Pembroke (1532–1536); later Queen Consort of England (1533–1536) as the second wife of Henry VIII.

== Diplomatic career ==
In his youth, Thomas Boleyn was active in the court of Henry VII. He attended the wedding of Prince Arthur with Catherine of Aragon. In 1503, he was part of Princess Margaret Tudor’s escort, to Scotland, to marry King James IV. He was created a Knight of the Bath at the coronation of Henry VIII in 1509. In February 1511, Boleyn took part in the Westminster Tournament, held to celebrate the birth of Henry, Duke of Cornwall. He was paired with Thomas Grey, 2nd Marquess of Dorset in costumes featuring emblems of pilgrimage to Santiago de Compostela. In 1522 he was appointed Treasurer of the Household.

His appointment in 1512 as ambassador to the Low Countries brought him into contact with the regent Archduchess Margaret of Austria. Like Thomas, Margaret of Austria spoke French and Latin and they got along well enough for her to accept his daughter Anne as a maid of honour.

Through his ability and the connections of his extended family, Thomas Boleyn became one of Henry VIII's leading diplomats. Known appointments and missions included:

- 1511 and 1517: Sheriff of Kent.
- 1512: One of a party of three envoys to the Netherlands.
- 1518–1520: ambassador to France, where he was initially involved in arrangements for the "Field of Cloth of Gold" meeting between Henry and the new French King Francis I. He was replaced as ambassador however by Sir Richard Wingfield who took over the preparations for the meeting between the two kings in 1520.
- 1521 and 1523: Envoy to Holy Roman Emperor Charles V.
- 1527: One of a large envoy to France.
- 1529: Envoy to a meeting of Holy Roman Emperor Charles V and Pope Clement VII, to seek support for the marriage annulment of Henry VIII and Catherine of Aragon. This was followed by another envoy to France.

== Titles obtained ==
Boleyn was invested as a Knight of the Garter in 1523.

Boleyn's claim to his other titles derived from his mother, Margaret Butler who was the younger daughter and co-heiress of Thomas Butler, 7th Earl of Ormond. Thomas Butler, as an Irish peer, should only have sat in the Parliament of Ireland. However, as a personal friend of Henry VII he was summoned to the English parliament in November 1488 as "Thomas Ormond de Rochford, chevaler". At this time, he was already 8th Earl of Carrick and 7th Earl of Ormond.

In English law, matrilineal descent is not considered valid for earldoms, and in Brehon law, then largely still in use in Ireland, new leaders were chosen by election. These customs were, in Boleyn's case, outweighed by a more important consideration – he was the father of two daughters. Henry VIII had affairs first with Boleyn's elder daughter Mary, then with his younger daughter, Anne. Boleyn's ambition was so considerable that unsubstantiated rumours had it that he allowed his wife to have an affair with the king, but those rumours were intended to steer the king away from marrying Anne, and even suggested that she was his own daughter. When it was claimed that Henry had had an affair with both Anne's sister and mother, the king replied to the rumours, "Never with the mother."

In 1525, Henry VIII became enamoured of Anne and began pursuing her. Her father was elevated to the peerage as Viscount Rochford on 18 June 1525. The title referred to the "barony" of Rochford supposedly created in 1488 for his grandfather. The title had fallen into abeyance as Ormond had died without any male heir in 1515. Boleyn is often thought of as a power hungry, ambitious and scheming man who sacrificed his daughters for personal gain, but his biographer, Lauren Mackay, has argued that he enjoyed a highly successful career as an ambassador and courtier years before his daughters caught the King's eye. As Henry's passion for Anne intensified, so did her father's titles, though these rewards were not solely due to Anne but also Boleyn's own merit. Henry pressured the main claimant to the earldom of Ormond, Piers Butler, to renounce all his claims to the titles in 1529. Piers Butler was rewarded by being created Earl of Ossory five days later.

Boleyn's claims to the Earldom of Wiltshire also depended upon his Irish relatives. This time, he had to go back to his maternal great-grandfather, James Butler, 4th Earl of Ormond, to establish a claim. While James Butler was indeed the 1st Earl of Wiltshire (of the third creation), on 1 May 1461 he lost his titles and his life when he was executed by the victorious Yorkists. The title was subsequently revived (in fourth and fifth creations) and bestowed on people unrelated to the Butlers of Ormond. This did not prevent the creation of the earldom for the 6th time. On 8 December 1529 Thomas Boleyn, Viscount Rochford, was created Earl of Wiltshire and Earl of Ormond.

Also on 8 December 1529, the Earl of Wiltshire's only surviving son, George, was granted the courtesy title of Viscount Rochford. His title of Viscount, although initially a courtesy title, ceased to be so sometime before 13 July 1530. On 17 May 1536, Lord Rochford was executed for treason, and all his titles were forfeited. His widow, Jane, Viscountess Rochford, however, continued to use the title after her husband's death. Lady Rochford was herself attainted for treason and beheaded at Tower Green (not Tower Hill) within the Tower of London on 13 February 1542 with Henry VIII's fifth wife, Queen Catherine Howard.

Boleyn was appointed Lord Privy Seal in 1530. In 1532, his daughter Anne was granted a peerage, being created Marquess of Pembroke in her own right, before marrying Henry the following year and becoming queen consort. During his daughter's tenure as Queen, Boleyn held immense power in the court, however Anne’s marriage to Henry would prove short lived. Following the birth of the princess Elizabeth in 1533, Anne suffered two miscarriages, and ultimately did not succeed in providing the King with a son. This, compounded by political tensions regarding Henry’s apparent disillusionment with certain aspects of the reformist movement, led to the withdrawal of the King’s favour. Her subsequent fall from grace and execution in May of 1536 saw Boleyn stripped of the influence he had enjoyed at court during the three years in which he was the Father-in-law of the King.

In 1534, Boleyn’s elder daughter, Mary, married a man by the name of William Stafford without having sought the permission of the King. She had been the wife of William Carey, and prior to her first marriage was reported to have been mistress to both the king of France, and Henry himself. Upon the discovery of the marriage, Mary was banished from court, primarily due to the fact that she was pregnant by this time, as well as her husband’s inferior birth. Stafford was eventually knighted in 1545 following military service in Scotland, however his wife had died in 1543. It is not thought that Mary ever returned to court after her marriage to Stafford.

Boleyn acquiesced in Anne's judicial execution and that of her brother Lord Rochford when Henry put her aside in favour of his third wife, Queen Jane Seymour. He served on the jury presiding over the determination of guilt for four of the men accused of having committed adultery with his daughter, but was ultimately spared having to pass judgment on his own children during their trials.

Following his children’s deaths, Thomas Boleyn lived out the rest of his life in disgrace. He was replaced as Lord Privy Seal by Thomas Cromwell. He suffered a final indignity when the claims of Piers Butler to the Earldom of Ormond were acknowledged, and he was again recognised as Earl of Ormond from 22 January 1538. As a consequence, there remained two earls of Ormond in the Kingdom until Boleyn’s death on 12 March 1539, less than a year after his wife Elizabeth Boleyn.

== Death and burial ==
He died at Hever Castle on 12 March 1539 and was buried in St. Peter's Church, Hever, where survives his elaborate monumental brass. He is depicted dressed in full robes wearing the insignia of a Knight of the Garter, with the Badge on his left breast and the Garter around his left knee. His head rests on a helm surmounted by a crest of a falcon displayed (his daughter's heraldic badge) and his feet rest on a griffin. The inscription reads: Here lieth Sir Thomas Bullen, Knight of the Order of the Garter, Erle of Wilscher and Erle or Ormunde, which decessed the 12th dai of Marche in the iere of our Lorde 1538.

== In popular culture ==
Thomas Boleyn has been portrayed by Sir Michael Hordern in Anne of the Thousand Days (1969), by Benjamin Whitrow in Henry VIII, and by Jack Shepherd and Mark Rylance in the 2003 and 2008 film versions of The Other Boleyn Girl, respectively. The 2007 Showtime series The Tudors has Nick Dunning in the role depicting him as ambitious, cunning and devious, constantly working to curry favour for his family against everyone else and always willing to "motivate" his daughter, Anne, until Henry lose interest in her. David Robb played Boleyn as a constantly furious, irascible schemer in Wolf Hall.

== Styles and honours ==
- Sir Thomas Boleyn KG KB (1523–1525)
- The Rt. Hon. The Viscount Rochford KG KB (1525–1529)
- The Rt. Hon. The Earl of Wiltshire and of Ormond KG KB (8 December 1529–1539)

Note: on 22 February 1538, the earldom of Ormond was restored to Piers Butler, 8th Earl of Ormond.

== See also ==
- Palace of Beaulieu
- List of ambassadors from the Kingdom of England to France

== Footnotes ==
- Block, Joseph S. (2004). "Boleyn, George, Viscount Rochford (c.1504–1536), courtier and diplomat". Oxford Dictionary of National Biography (online ed.). Oxford University Press. doi:10.1093/ref:odnb/2793. (Subscription, Wikipedia Library access or UK public library membership required.)
- Chrimes, Stanley Bertram (1999). Henry VIII. New Haven: Yale University Press.
- Cherry, Clare (2011). George Boleyn: A Biography [unpublished manuscript].
- Cokayne, George Edward (1949). White, Geoffrey H. (ed.). The Complete Peerage. Vol. XI. London: St. Catherine Press.
- Cokayne, George Edward (1945). Doubleday, H. A. (ed.). The Complete Peerage. Vol. X. London: St. Catherine Press.
- Davies, Catherine (2004). "Boleyn [née Parker], Jane, Viscountess Rochford (d. 1542), Courtier". Oxford Dictionary of National Biography (online ed.). Oxford University Press. doi:10.1093/ref:odnb/70799. (Subscription, Wikipedia Library access or UK public library membership required.)
- Hughes, Jonathan (2004). "Boleyn, Thomas, earl of Wiltshire and earl of Ormond (1476/7–1539), courtier and nobleman". Oxford Dictionary of National Biography (online ed.). Oxford University Press. doi:10.1093/ref:odnb/2795. (Subscription, Wikipedia Library access or UK public library membership required.)
- Ives, E. W. "Anne (Anne Boleyn) (c.1500–1536), queen of England, second consort of Henry VIII". Oxford Dictionary of National Biography (online ed.). Oxford University Press. doi:10.1093/ref:odnb/557. (Subscription, Wikipedia Library access or UK public library membership required.)
- Ives, Eric (2005). The Life and Death of Anne Boleyn: 'The Most Happy' (Paperback). Blackwell Publishing. ISBN 978-1-4051-3463-7.
- Mackay, Lauren (2018). Among the Wolves of Court: The Untold Story of Thomas and George Boleyn. London: IB Tauris/Bloomsbury Publishing. ISBN 978-1788310437.
- Mackay, Lauren. "The Life and Career of Thomas Boleyn (1477–1539):Courtier, Ambassador, and Statesman" Unpublished PhD Thesis, University of Newcastle Australia, 2018.
- Richardson, Douglas (2004). Everingham, Kimball G. (ed.). Plantagenet Ancestry: A Study in Colonial and Medieval Families. Baltimore, Maryland: Genealogical Publishing Co. ISBN 978-0806317502.
- Ridgway, Claire (2012). "The Lost Boleyns". The Anne Boleyn Collection: The Real Truth About the Tudors (Paperback). MadeGlobal Publishing. pp. 189–195. ISBN 978-1470038168.
- Shaw, William A. (1906). The Knights of England. London: Sherrat and Hughes.
- Starkey, David (May 1981). "Holbein's Irish Sitter". The Burlington Magazine. 123 (938): 300–301, 303. JSTOR 880241.in JSTOR
- Weir, Alison (2012). Mary Boleyn: 'The Great and Infamous Whore'. London: Vintage Books. ISBN 9780099546481.
- Weir, Alison (1991). The Six Wives of Henry VIII. New York: Grove Weidenfeld.
- Wilkinson, Josephine (2009). Mary Boleyn: The True Story of Henry VIII's Favourite Mistress. New York: Amberley Publishing. ISBN 978-1-84868-525-3.

Political offices
Preceded by Sir Thomas Parr	Comptroller of the Household; 1519–1521	Succeeded by Sir Henry Guildford
Preceded by Sir Edward Poynings	Treasurer of the Household; 1521–1525	Succeeded by Sir William FitzWilliam
Preceded by Cuthbert Tunstall (Bishop of London)	Lord Privy Seal; 1530–1536	Succeeded by Sir Thomas Cromwell
