= Lauren Mackay =

Australian historian, author, and lecturer

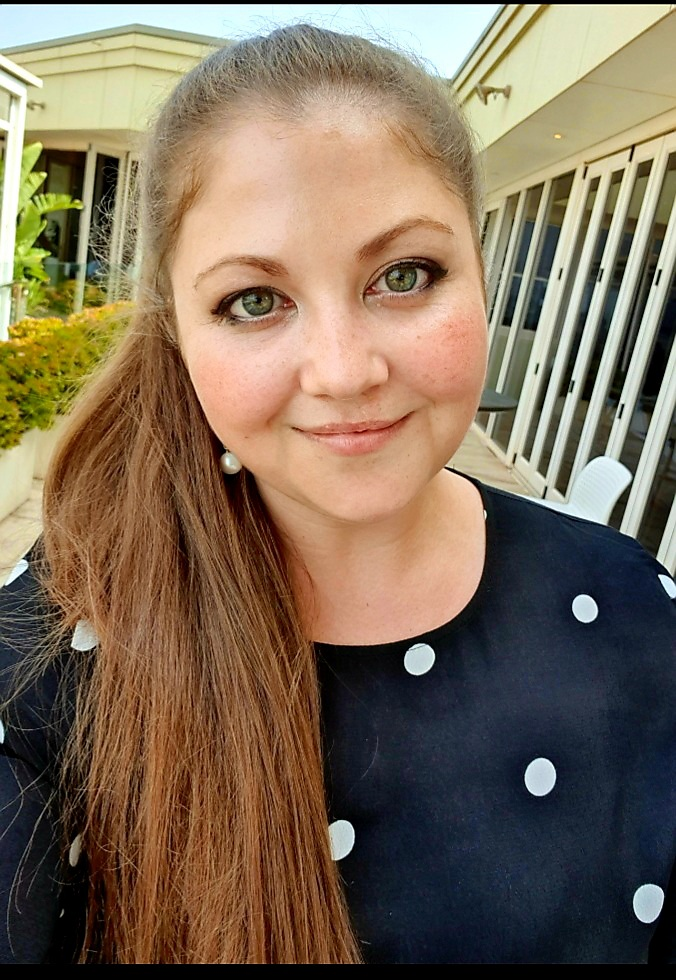
- Education: University of Sydney; University of New England; University of Newcastle, Australia
- Occupations: Historian, author
- Notable work: Inside The Tudor Court Among the Wolves of Court The Wolf Hall Companion
- Honours: Fellow of the Royal Historical Society
- Website: www.lauren-mackay.co.uk

Lauren Mackay FRHistS is an Australian historian, author, and lecturer specialising in the Tudor period and the broader early modern world.

== Early life and education ==
Mackay completed her bachelor's degree at the Sydney Conservatorium of Music/University of Sydney, Australia. She completed her Master of History with University of New England, and received her PhD from the University of Newcastle, Australia. Her PhD thesis investigated the life and career of Thomas Boleyn, father of Henry VIII's second wife, Anne Boleyn.

== Career ==
Mackay's areas of research encompass medieval and early modern politics; the Renaissance and Reformation; diplomacy; humanism; and early modern literature and culture. Her research also includes the wider realms of early modern Europe, in particular the Hapsburg Charles V, Francis I of France, and the Ottoman Suleiman the Magnificent. Mackay has given talks around the UK at many venues, such as Leeds Castle the National Portrait Gallery, London, Hever Castle, and at the 2018 BBC history weekends at York and Winchester.

== TV documentaries ==
In 2020 she appeared in the three-part television documentary, Henry VIII and the King's men (Smithsonian Channel UK)

In 2021 she was a consultant and expert contributor for the BBC2 three-part series The Boleyns: A Scandalous Family, which also draws on her research on the Boleyn men.

In November 2022 Mackay, along with Professors Suzannah Lipscomb and Tracy Borman, provided the historical evidence behind the reality of Henry VIII and Anne Boleyn's relationship in Netflix's Blood, Sex & Royalty.

== Recognition and honours ==
Mackay is a Fellow of the Royal Historical Society, in recognition of her contribution to historical scholarship.

== Publications ==
Mackay has been a regular contributor to BBC History Magazine and All About History Magazine.

=== Books ===
- Inside the Tudor Court: Henry VIII and his Wives through the Eyes of the Spanish Ambassador is the first biography of Imperial Ambassador, Eustace Chapuys.
- Among the Wolves of Court: The Untold Story of Thomas and George Boleyn (the latter referring to George Boleyn, Viscount Rochford), the first scholarly biography of the Boleyn men, was based on her doctoral research and published by Bloomsbury Publishing in September 2018.
- The Wolf Hall Companion, is an historical companion to Hilary Mantel's acclaimed Wolf Hall trilogy.
- Thunder Through the Realms: Five Kingdoms and the shaping of Early Modern Europe (Bloomsbury, 2022) ISBN 9781788310420
