= François van der Delft =

German diplomat

François van der Delft (c. 1500 – 21 June 1550) was Imperial ambassador to the court of Henry VIII of England from 1545 to 1547, and ambassador to the court of Edward VI of England from 1547 to 1550.

Van der Delft came to England in 1545 to represent Charles V. In the summer of 1545, after Eustace Chapuys' departure, he was officially introduced to King Henry aboard the Henry Grace à Dieu shortly before the Battle of the Solent. Under Edward VI, in 1550, as the Privy Council put pressure on Princess Mary to restrain the usage of her Mass, van der Delft suggested to her to flee England. He was recalled before anything came of this plan, and died shortly afterwards. He was replaced as ambassador by Jean Scheyfve.
