= Louis of Praet =

- Born: 1488; Bruges
- Died: 7 October 1555
- Other names: Louis of Flanders, Lord of Praet; Lodewijk van Praet
- Occupations: politician, nobleman

Louis of Praet, Louis of Flanders, Lord of Praet, or locally Lodewijk van Praet (1488, Bruges – 7 October 1555) was a nobleman from the Low Countries and an important diplomat and statesman under the Emperor Charles V.

Arms of Louis of Praet showing his descent from the Counts of Flanders, "D'or, au lion de sable, armé et lampassé de gueules Arms of the Counts of Flanders, chargé d'une billette d'argent sur l'épaule.

Louis was descended through his father from a bastard son of Louis of Male, count of Flanders, and through his mother from a bastard daughter of Philip the Good. He was a student of the Brethren of the Common Life and studied in Leuven.

Louis was 'hoog-baljuw' ("grand bailiff") of Ghent from 1515 to 1522 and of Bruges from 1523 to 1549. He served the Emperor between 1522 and 1525 as ambassador in England, where he in the end got into severe conflict with Thomas Wolsey and had to leave the country. Between 1525 and 1526 he also served as ambassador in France.

In England, Praet met the Spanish humanist Juan Luis Vives who dedicated his 1523 book De Consultatione to him. Praet also either directly inspired or encouraged Vives to write his book On Assistance to the Poor, which he did when living in Bruges in 1526. Vives dedicated the book to Lord Praet, writing:

"Actually I had been asked to do this some time ago, when I was in England, by Lord Praet your Burgomaster, who deliberates deeply and often -as indeed he ought- concerning the public welfare of the city".

Louis was elected knight of the Golden Fleece in 1531 and then took up his residence in the Netherlands. He served as Stadtholder in Holland and Zeeland between 1544 and 1546.

In 1555 he was buried in an impressive mausoleum at Aalter, between Bruges and Ghent.

== Notes ==
Preceded by René of Châlon	Stadtholder of Holland, Zeeland and Utrecht; 1544–1546	Succeeded by Maximilian II of Burgundy, Marquess of Veere
