= Íñigo López de Mendoza y Zúñiga =

Castilian clergyman

His Eminence Íñigo López de Mendoza y Zúñiga O.Praem.
- Bishop of Burgos
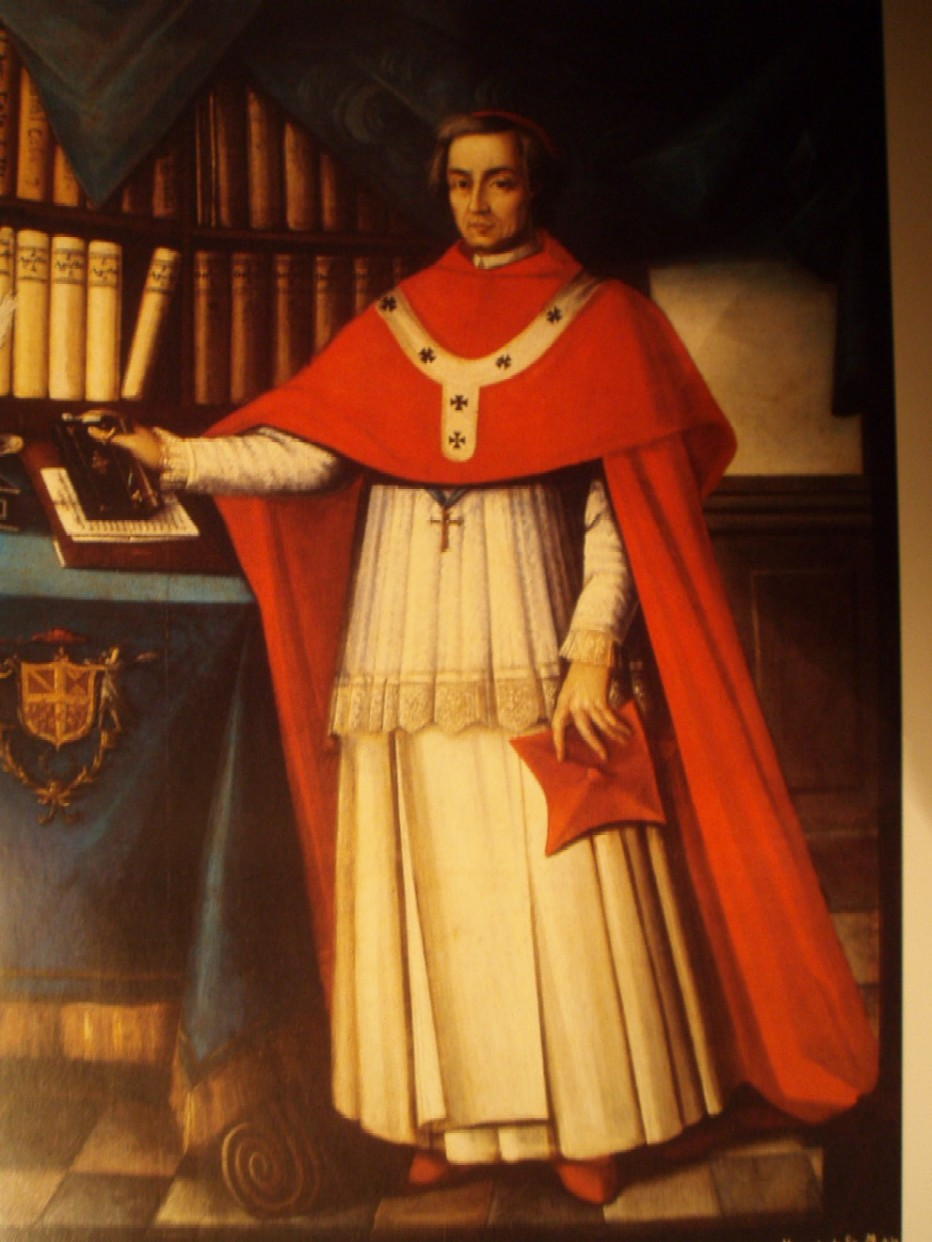
- Diocese: Burgos
- See: Burgos
- Appointed: 2 March 1529
- Term ended: 9 June 1535
- Predecessor: Antonio de Rojas Manrique
- Successor: Juan Álvarez de Toledo
- Other post: Cardinal-Priest of San Nicola in Carcere
- Previous post: Bishop of Coria (c. 1528–1529)

Orders
- Consecration: by 1528
- Created cardinal: 9 March 1530 by Pope Clement VII
- Rank: Cardinal-Priest

Personal details
- Born: 1489
- Died: 9 June 1535 (aged 46)
- Denomination: Roman Catholic

Don Íñigo López de Mendoza y Zúñiga (1489 – 9 June 1535), cardinal, archbishop of Burgos and bishop of Coria, was a Castilian clergyman and diplomat in the service of Emperor Charles V.

== Biography ==
Don Íñigo was born in Aranda de Duero, the second son of Pedro de Zúñiga y Avellaneda, 2nd Count of Miranda del Castañar, and Catalina de Velasco, daughter of Pedro Fernández de Velasco, 2nd Count of Haro. Although a Zúñiga, he was named Mendoza after his maternal grandmother Mencia de Mendoza. His brother was Francisco de Zúñiga Avellaneda y Velasco.

In 1526 he went as ambassador for Charles V to England. On his way there, he was arrested for 4 months by the French. In 1528 he was imprisoned by the English because of deteriorating relations between Charles and Henry VIII. He was only rarely allowed to send letters. After this, he asked for his recall, both because of bad health, and because the English didn't trust him. He was allowed to quit England in May 1529 and was succeeded in his post by Eustace Chapuys.

After that he went to Italy, where he witnessed Charles' coronation as Holy Roman Emperor at Bologna in 1530. That same year he was also made a cardinal.

De Mendoza is portrayed by Declan Conlon in Showtime's series The Tudors. On the show it is not mentioned that he was a Clergyman.
