= Sheriff of Norfolk and Suffolk =

This is a list of Sheriffs of Norfolk and Suffolk. The Sheriff (since 1974 called High Sheriff) is the oldest secular office under the Crown and is appointed annually by the Crown. He was originally the principal law enforcement officer in the county and presided at the Assizes and other important county meetings. After 1576 there was a separate Sheriff of Norfolk and Sheriff of Suffolk.

== List of Sheriffs of Norfolk and Suffolk ==
=== 11th century ===
- Toli (died 1066)
- Norman
- 1070–c. 1080 William Malet (died 1071) and Robert Malet
- Before 1086 Robert Blund

=== 12th century ===
- 1086–1107 Roger Bigot
- Robert Rabet 1110
- 1115–1129 Robert fitz Walter
- 1129 Richard Basset and Aubrey de Vere
- 1135 Robert Fitz Walter
- John de Chesney
- c. 1146–1153 William de Chesney
- 1154 Richard Bassett and Aubrey de Vere
- 1155 Will de Nova Villa and William de Jeaxmeto
- 1156-1162 William de Chesney
- 1163–1168 Oggerus Dapifer
- 1169–1174 Bartholemew Glanvill and
  Vinar Capellanus and William Bardull
- 1175–1185 Vinar Capellanus
- 1186 Vinar Capellanus and William son of Hervei
- 1187–1188 William son of Hervei
- 1189 Robert fitzRoger and Peter de Edichfeld
- 1190–1192 Robert fitzRoger and Samuel de Salia
- 1193–1195 Osbert de Longchamp
- 1196–1198 Robert FitzRoger and Richard de Gosfield
- 1198-1200 Robert FitzRoger

=== 13th century ===
- 1201–1203 Peter de Mealton
- 1205–1206 Alex de Dunham and Alex Banister
- 1207–1210 John de Cornheard
- 1211–1212 William de Huntingfield and William Esturmi
- 1213 Robert Fitz Roger and William son of Rosicke
- 1214 William de Huntingfield and William Esturmi
- 1215 John son of Robert and Robert de Kent
- 1216 John son of Robert son of Roger
- 1221 Richard Duket
- 1217–1224 Hubert de Burgh
- 1225–1226 Hugh Rufus
- 1227–1231 Herbert de Alencum
- 1232–1233 Robert de Briwes/Thomas of Hengrave
- 1234–1235 Thomas de Heningham
- 1236–1237 Thomas of Ingoldisthorpe
- 1238 Robert de Broyons
- 1239–1240 John de Ulecott
- 1241–1242 Henry de Heketon and Hamo Passeleve
- 1243–1248 Hamo Passeleve
- 1249–1254 Robert de Savage
- 1255–1257 William de Swyneford
- 1258 Hamo Hanteyn
- 1259–1260 Hamo and Sir Hervey de Stanhoe
- 1261 Philip Marmion and William de Hekam
- 1262–1266 Nicholas Espigornel
- 1267–1269 Robert de Norton
- 1270–1272 William Giffard
- 1273 Robert son of John
- 1274–1275 Walter de Shelfhaugre
- 1276 Walter Granimt
- 1277–1280 John Brito and William de Bedham
- 1281–1282 William de Doinge
- 1283–1288 William de Rochinger
- 1289 Richard de Belhus
- 1290–1292 William de Nedham
- 1293–1295 William de Gerbe
- 1296–1297 William de Kirdeston
- 1298–1299 William de Sutton
- 1300 William de Ailton
- unknown Walter of Elingham
- unknown Roger de Cressy
- unknown Fulk Bagnard
- unknown John de Vaux

=== 14th century ===
- 1301–1305 Robert Hereward
- 1306 Egid. de Mumpinzon
- 1307 Thomas de Sancto Omero
- 1308 Henry de Seagrave
- 1309–1311 Robert Baygnard
- 1312 Robert and Alex de Claveringe
- 1313 Richard de Claveringe
- 1314 Richard de Refham
- 1315 Richard and Alex de Claveringe
- 1316 John de Fitten and William de Rungeton
- 1317 John Howard
- 1318 John Seafoule
- 1319–1321 John Howard and Edward Hemingre
- 1322
- 1323–1325 Egid. de Wachesham
- 1327 Thomas de Lindringham and Robert de Walkefare
- 1328–1330 John de Londham
- 1331 Roger de Kirdeston (son of William, HS 1296)
- 1332 Roger de Bourne and Roger de Kirdeston
- 1333 Roger de Bourne and Edward de Baconsthorpe
- 1334–1335 John de Cailly
- 1336–1337 Robert de Causton
- 1338 John de Harsike
- 1339 Robert de Causton and John Harsike
- 1340 Robert
- 1341 Thomas Belisforde
- 1342–1344 Edward de Creting
- 1345 John Haward
- 1346–1348 William de Middleton
- 1349–1350 John de Colby
- 1351–1352 William de Middleton
- 1353–1354 Edward de Creting
- 1355 Thomas de Mareux
- 1356–1358 Guy Sinclere
- 1359–1360 John de Battlesden
- 1361–1362 Thomas St Omer
- 1363 Roger Gyney
- 1364 William de Clere
- 1365–1366 Thomas Morieux
- 1367–1368 Roger Holditch
- 1369 Edward de Thorpe
- 1370 Robert Bacon
- 1371 John Holbroke
- 1372 John Mantby
- 1373 William de Kirdeston
- 1374 Oliver Calthorp
- 1375 John de Browes
- 1377 John Harsikes
- 1378 Sir Stephen de Hales of Testerton
- 1379 John de Mantby
- 1380 William Wynter
- 1381 William de Kirdeston
- 1382 John de Wolverston
- 1383 John Tudenham
- 1384 Andrew Cavendish of Cavendish
- 1385 Radulph Bigot
- 1386 Galf. Mitchell
- 1387–1388 Thomas Corsonn
- 1389 Hugh Falstolf of Great Yarmouth and Caister
- 1390 Robert Carbonell
- 1391 John Knyvet of Mendlesham
- 1392 William Wynter
- 1393 Sir William Argentine of Halesworth
- 1394 Gilbert Debenham of Alburgh, Norfolk and Great and Little Wenham, Suffolk
- 1395–1396 Thomas Corsonn
- 1397–1398 William Rees of Tharston
- 1399 John Gournay of Harpley and West Barsham

=== 15th century ===
- 1400 John Hevenyngham (1st term)
- 1401 Sir Edmund Oldhall of East Dereham and Little Fransham, Norfolk
- 1402 Sir John Ingoldisthorpe of Ingoldisthorpe and Raynham, Norfolk
- 1403 Ralph (or Robert?) Ramsey of Great Yarmouth and West Somerton, Norfolk and Kenton, Suffolk
- 1404 Nicolas Winchingham
- 1406 Sir Robert Berney of Great Witchingham and Gunton
- 1407 William Rees of Tharston
- 1408 Ralph Ramsey of Great Yarmouth and West Somerton, Norfolk and Kenton, Suffolk
- 1409 Oliver Groos of Sloley
- 1410 Sir Robert Berney of Great Witchingham and Gunton
- 1411 Thomas Lovell
- 1413 Sir Edmund Oldhall of East Dereham and Little Fransham, Norfolk
- 1414 John Heaveningham (2nd term)
- 1415 John Spencer of Banham
- 1416 John Lancaster of Bressingham
- 1417 Andrew Botiller of Great Waldingfield
- 1418 Edmund Wynter of Barningham Winter
- 1419 Oliver Groos of Sloley
- 1420 John Fitz Rauf
- 1421
- 1422 Robert Clifton
- 1423 John Shardlow
- 1424 Brian Stapilton
- 1425 Oliver Groos of Sloley
- 1426 John Tirrey
- 1427 Gilbert Debenham
- 1428 Henry Drury
- 1429 Henry Dray
- 1430 John Shardlow
- 1431 John Ropley
- 1432 Sir Thomas Tuddenham
- 1433 Henry Grey
- 1434 John Fitz Rauf
- 1435 Thomas Chambre
- 1436 John Hopton (1st term)
- 1437 John Heaveningham
- 1438 Thomas Brewes
- 1439 Miles Stapleton
- 1440 Roger Chamberlain
- 1441 William Calthorpe (1st term)
- 1442 Thomas Brewes
- 1443 John Fitz Rauf
- 1444 John Hopton (2nd term)
- 1445 William Tirrell
- 1446 Thomas Daniel
- 1447 Philip Wentworth
- 1439 Egid. St Lo
- 1458 John Gray
- 3 Dec 1450: John Jermyn
- 8 Nov 1451: John Clopton
- 8 Nov 1452: Thomas Sharnebourne
- 5 Nov 1453: John Denston
- 4 Nov 1454: John Wingfield (1st term)
- 4 Nov 1455: John Clopton
- 17 Nov 1456: Richard Bothe
- 1456 Egid St Lo
- 1459 William Calthorpe (2nd term)
- 1460 Philip Wentworth
- 1461 John Howard, 1st Duke of Norfolk
- 1462–1463 Thomas Montgomery
- 1464 William Calthorpe (3rd term)
- 1465 Alexander Cressener
- 1466 William Hopton
- 1467 Thomas Montgomery
- 1468 John Twyer
- 1469 Roger Ree
- 1470 John Heveningham
- 1471 William Knevet
- 1472 John Wingfield (2nd term)
- 1473 Roger Ree
- 1474 Robert Ratclyff
- 1475 John Hastings
- 1476 William Calthorpe (4th term)
- 1477 Thomas Howard
- 1478 Robert Radclyff
- 1479 William Hopton
- 1480 William Knyvet
- 1481 Alexander Cressener
- 1482 Henry Wentworth
- 1483 John Wyngfield (1st term)
- 1484 Ralph Willoughby
- 1485 Richard Pole
- 1486 John Paston
- 1487 Edward Bedingfeld
- 1488 Sir Ralph Shelton of Shelton Hall
- 1489 Robert Lovell
- 1490 Simon Wyseman
- 1491 Philip Lewes
- 1492 Robert Brandon
- 1493 John Wyngfield (2nd term)
- 1494 William Carew
- 1495 Richard Southwell
- 1496 Roger le Strange
- 1497 Robert Curson
- 1498 Edward Arundell
- 1499 Philip Calthorp
- 1500 William Boleyn

=== 16th century ===
- 1501 Humphrey Catesby
- 1502 Robert Clare
- 1503 Edmund Jenny
- 1505 Sir John Shelton of Shelton Hall
- 1507 Philip Bothe of Shrubland Old Hall, Suffolk
- 1508 Robert Brandon
- 1510 Sir Richard Wentworth
- 1512 Sir Roger Townshend of Raynham
- 1513 Lionel Tollemache of Helmingham
- 1514 Thomas Gibbon of West Lynn
- 1515 Sir John Heydon
- 1516 Sir Anthony Wyngfield
- 1517 Sir Richard Wentworth
- 1518 William Paston
- 1519 Sir Roger Townshend of Raynham
- 1520 Sir John Heydon
- 1521 Humphrey Wingfield of Brantham, Suffolk and Ipswich
- 1522 Sir Thomas Bedingfeld of Oxburgh Hall
- 1523 Sir John Shelton of Shelton Hall
- 1524 Sir John Heveningham
- 1525 Roger Townshend of Raynham
- 1526 Francis Lovell
- 1527 Sir Philip Tylney
- 1528 Sir William Paston
- 1529 Sir Edward Bedingfeld of Oxburgh Hall
- 1530–1531 Sir Thomas Jermyn of Rushbrooke Hall
- 1532 Sir Thomas le Strange of Hunstanton
- 1533 Sir Thomas Russhe
- 1534 Sir Richard Southwell
- 1535 Sir Walter Hobart
- 1536 Sir William Drury of Hawstead
- 1537 Edmund Wyndham of Felbrigg (1st term)
- 1538 Sir Francis Lovell
- 1539 Sir Edmund Knyvet of Buckenham Castle
- 1540 Sir William Fermour of Barsham, Norfolk
- 1541 Sir Thomas Jermyn of Rushbrook Hall
- 1542 Sir John Jermy
- 1543 Sir Francis Lovell
- 1544 Sir William Drury of Hawstead
- 1545 Sir Edmund Wyndham of Felbrigg (2nd term)
- 1547 Sir John Robsart of Syderstone, Norfolk
- 1548 Sir Nicholas Le Strange of Hunstanton
- 1549 Sir Edmund Wyndham of Felbrigg (3rd term)
- 1550 William Waldegrave of Stanninghall, Norfolk
- 1551 Sir John Robsart of Syderstone
- 1552 Sir Thomas Cornwallis of Broome, Norfolk
- 1553 Thomas Wodehouse of Kimberley
- 1554 Sir John Shelton of Shelton Hall
- 1555 John Sulyard of Wetherden, Suffolk
- 1556 Sir Christopher Heydon of Baconsthorpe, Norfolk
- 1557 Henry D'Oyly of Pond Hall, Hadleigh, Suffolk
- 1558 Sir Ambrose Jermyn of Rushbrooke, Suffolk
- 1559 John Appleyard of Bracon Ash
- 1560 Sir Robert Wingfield of Easton, Suffolk
- 1561 Sir Thomas Tindall of Banham, Norfolk
- 1562 Sir William Butts of Thornage, Norfolk
- 1563 Thomas Wodehouse of Kimberley
- 1564 Sir Owen Hopton of Yoxford, Suffolk
- 1565 Sir William Paston of Paston
- 1566 Lionel Tollemache of Helmingham, Suffolk
- 1567 Edward Clere of Blickling
- 1568 William Waldegrave of Stanninghall
- 1569 Sir Christopher Heydon of Baconsthorpe
- 1570 Edmund Withipole of Christchurch Mansion, Ipswich, Suffolk
- 1571 Sir Ralph Shelton of Shelton Hall
- 1572 Sir Ambrose Jermyn of Rushbrook, Suffolk
- 1573 Henry D'Oyly of Shotesham, Norfolk
- 1573 Hamon l'Estrange
- 1574 Thomas Felton of Playford, Suffolk
- after 1574 – See High Sheriff of Norfolk or High Sheriff of Suffolk
