= Audrey Walsingham =

English courtier

- Born: Audrey Shelton; 10 June 1568
- Died: May 1624 (aged 55)
- Buried: 20 May 1624; St Nicholas, Chislehurst
- Noble family: Shelton
- Spouse: Thomas Walsingham
- Issue: Thomas Walsingham
- Father: Sir Ralph Shelton
- Mother: Mary Woodhouse
- Occupation: Lady of the Bedchamber to Queen Elizabeth I Mistress of the Robes to Queen Anne

Audrey Walsingham (née Shelton; 1568–1624) was an English courtier. She served as Lady of the Bedchamber to Queen Elizabeth I of England, and then as Mistress of the Robes to Anne of Denmark from 1603 until 1619.

== Family connections ==
She was born on 10 June 1568 to Sir Ralph Shelton of Shelton, Norfolk and Mary Woodhouse, daughter of William Woodhouse of Waxham. Her mother died five days after her birth. Sometimes called "Etheldreda", the parish registers of Chiselhurst recorded her first name as "Adrian".

Her father was a son of Sir John Shelton and Margaret Parker, daughter of the heir to Henry, Lord Morley. John Shelton's mother was Anne Shelton née Boleyn, aunt of Anne Boleyn, Henry VIII's queen, and his sisters included Madge Shelton and Mary Shelton. Her aunt Mary Shelton married Sir John Scudamore.

Audrey Shelton married Sir Thomas Walsingham, cousin of Sir Francis Walsingham. Their home was Scadbury Manor at Chislehurst.

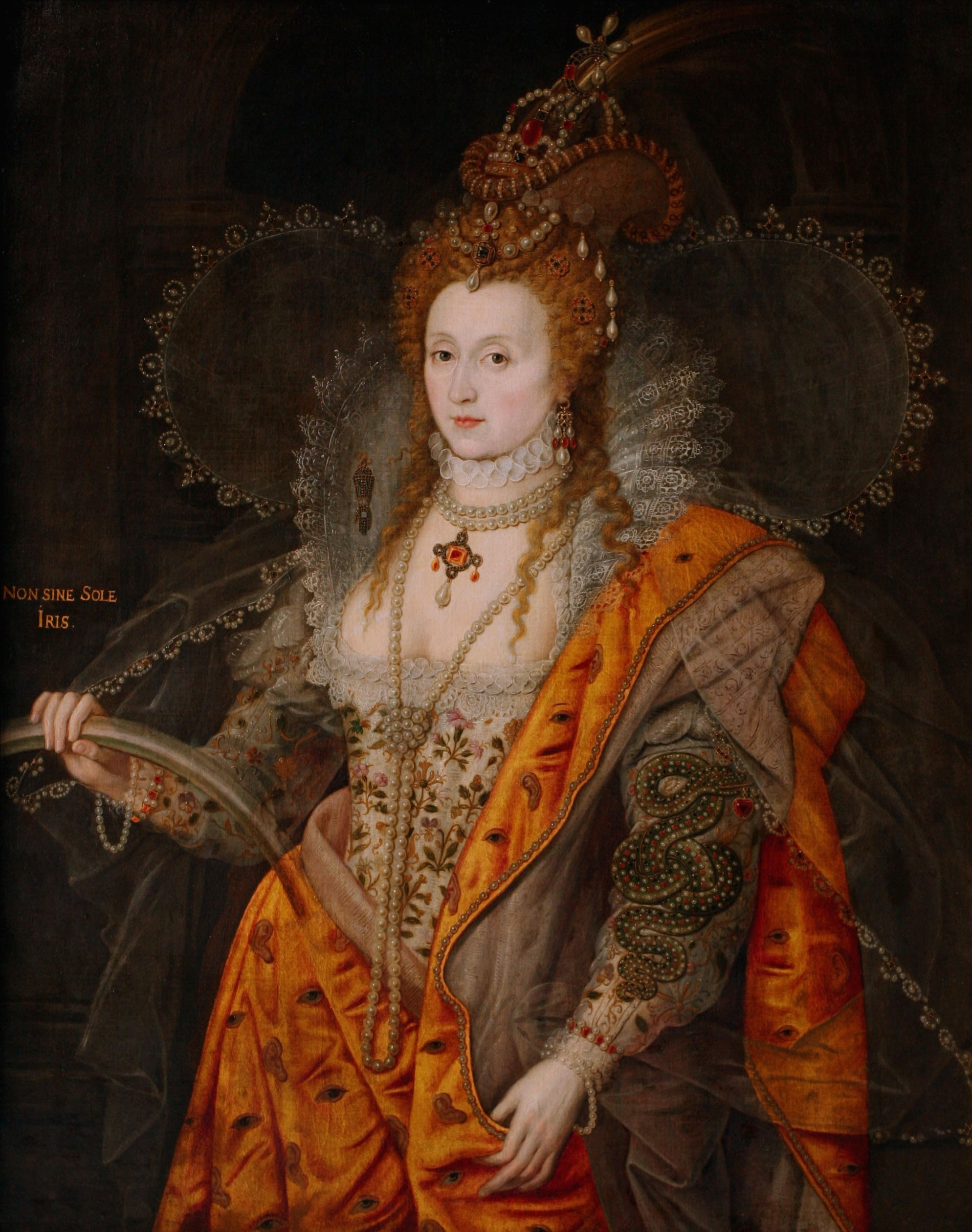
The "Rainbow" portrait of Queen Elizabeth has been associated with the Harefield Entertainment

== Lady of the Bedchamber to Elizabeth ==
She served as Lady of the Bedchamber to Queen Elizabeth. She signed an inventory of the wardrobe of Queen Elizabeth in April 1600 and October 1601, as "A. Walsingham".

In 1600 the Earl of Northumberland presented Elizabeth with a petticoat supplied by Lady Walsingham and a jewel bought from John Spilman, the total value of his gift was £200.

During Thomas Egerton's entertainment at Harefield in August 1602, she was assigned in the lottery the prize of a cutwork stomacher in the lottery with these verses; "This stomacher is full of windows wrought, Yet none through them can look into your thought." Walsingham presented the queen with Egerton's gift of a gown or robe embroidered with rainbows and recited verses about Iris and St Swithin. The historian Janet Arnold linked this presentation at Harefield with the "Rainbow" portrait of Elizabeth at Hatfield House. The embroidery depicted in the portrait has some similarities with the contemporary petticoat formerly preserved at St Faith's Bacton, Herefordshire.

== Union of the Crowns ==
In 1603, Walsingham was selected by the Privy Council to join an English entourage sent to meet the new queen Anne of Denmark at the Scottish border at Berwick-upon-Tweed, and accompany her to London. Her companions included the Countess of Kildare and the Countess of Worcester. A Venetian diplomat, Giovanni Carlo Scaramelli, wrote that the six great ladies were escorted to Berwick-upon-Tweed by 200 horsemen. Walsingham was in Berwick by 27 May. On that day, Anne of Denmark left Stirling Castle, where she had suffered a miscarriage, for Edinburgh. The Countess of Kildare left her companions in Berwick that day, and went ahead to Edinburgh.

At first, the queen was reluctant to make Walsingham and Kildare ladies of her Privy Chamber, but preferred Lucy Russell, Countess of Bedford. Walsingham was made a lady of the Privy Chamber, and Anne Clifford noted that she was a great favourite of Sir Robert Cecil at this time.

== Mistress of the Robes to Anne of Denmark ==
Audrey Walsingham was appointed guardian and keeper of the robes by Anne of Denmark on 26 July 1603, the day after her coronation, and given a salary of 40 marks yearly. The role including buying "stuffs of gold, silver, tinsels or silks", and appointing tailors and embroiderers for the queen's apparel. An account shows that she checked bills from suppliers like the hosier Hugh Griffiths who made silk stockings. In May 1604 she was granted an annual pension of £200 for attending the queen, and they became friends.

According to Arbella Stuart, Anne of Denmark asked Walsingham and the Countess of Suffolk to take Elizabeth's old clothes from a store in the Tower of London for a masque at New Year, The Vision of the Twelve Goddesses. William Cookesbury supplied feathers for the masque costumes to Audrey Walsingham and Elizabeth Carey. Walsingham also participated in the masques organised by Anne, playing the role of Astraea in The Vision of the Twelve Goddesses (January 1604), and Periphere in The Masque of Blackness (1605).

In February 1605 she was given £200 towards the expenses of the pregnant queen's "lying down or confinement". By 1606, she held Walsingham House at Horse Guards, on the site of present day Admiralty House, London. In May 1606 she was paid £300 for linen supplied to Anne of Denmark during childbed and for the use of Princess Mary. Another payment for linen and lacework during Anne's lying-in while pregnant with Princess Sophie amounted to £614. One of her servants died at Hampton Court in October 1606 during a plague scare.

In April 1608 she was confirmed as Mistress of the Robes with an annual fee of 40 marks and two annuities worth £200 each. Anne of Denmark gave her presents of her old clothes, on 6 January 1611 she received a velvet gown with stripes of cloth of gold and gold lace. She had a lodging near court at the Tilt Yard at Whitehall Palace.

She was rumored to have a relationship with Robert Cecil (d. 1612), and in the anonymous poem O Ladies, Ladies Howle & Cry she was accused of having caused his death together with the Countess of Suffolk by infecting him with syphilis.

On 20 August 1613 Anne of Denmark was received at Wells, Somerset. The mayor William Bull hosted a dinner for members of her household including Lady Walsingham, Lady Hatton, and the four maids of honour.

In August 1615 thieves took embroidered cushion and stool covers and sewing silk for embroidery weighing 40 pounds from Whitehall Palace said to belong to her husband, but may have been connected with the queen's wardrobe. The Venetian ambassador Antonio Foscarini described his final audience with Anne of Denmark in a gallery at Greenwich Palace on 4 December 1615, accompanied only by the Mistress of the Robes and his secretary, Giovanni Rizzardo.

The court physician Théodore de Mayerne noted she suffered from serious headaches or migraine. She died in May 1624, according to Mayerne from a fever and a cold, and was buried at St Nicholas, Chislehurst.

Court offices
Preceded by Dorothy Stafford	Mistress of the Robes to Queen Anne; 1603–1619	Succeeded by Susan Feilding, Countess of Denbigh
