= John Shelton (courtier) =

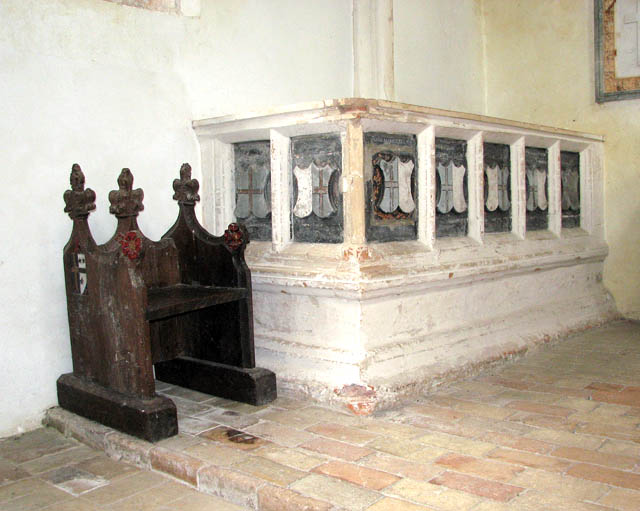
Chest tomb of Sir John Shelton, St Mary's Church, Shelton, Norfolk

Arms of Shelton: Azure, a cross or

Sir John Shelton (In or before 1503 – 1558) was the eldest son of Sir John Shelton and Anne Boleyn, the aunt of Queen Anne. John's sister, Mary Shelton, who married Sir John Heveningham, was possibly the mistress of Henry VIII of England during 1535.

Shelton may have been High Sheriff of Norfolk and Suffolk as early as 1523, when he was 20 years old. He seems to have been overshadowed by his father's great wealth. Sir John senior had seen his star rise with the Boleyn family, when he and Lady Shelton acquired the custody of Princess Mary at Hatfield House. But when his father died in 1539, Sir John junior preferred the quietude of the country, since his father's lawyers, William Coningsby and Sir Nicholas Hare were prosecuted under the Statute of Uses for a fraudulent misrepresentation of the will. Shelton joined the Norfolk bench in 1543 after the Howard faction's fall from power. The Wiltshire Sheltons were sympathetic to the reformed religion. He served on the Boulogne campaign which ended in the triumphant parade of the king in the captured port town. And when the old king died, he was knighted at Edward VI's coronation in 1547. In 1550 he was appointed Commissioner for parish relief of the poor.

On the accession of Queen Mary in 1553 he elevated to the Privy Council in part at least by pledging to purchase an annuity for £60 expressing adherence to the Catholic regime. He attended the Council regularly until March 1555, when the Catholic purges and heretical burnings were at their height. Therefore, he was elected to Mary's third parliament as a knight of the shire for Norfolk, which was preceded by the approval for his appointment as High Sheriff for both Norfolk and Suffolk in 1554. Shelton was ever the practical politician, refusing to quit the parliamentary session before its dissolution by the monarch. He was retired from public affairs of state when in March 1556 the Council wrote to thank him for his reports from Norfolk. They told him to report to Henry Radclyffe, 2nd Earl of Sussex.

Shelton made his will on 12 February 1558. He died two days before the queen on 15 November 1558. It appears from his inquisition post mortem that before dying he had disposed of all his estates apart from the Manor of Carrow. He may have sold them, or they may have been repossessed by the Catholic monarchy.

== Family ==
He married Margaret Parker, daughter of Henry Parker, 10th Baron Morley. Their children were:

- Sir Ralph Shelton, who succeeded his father and married Mary Woodhouse, a daughter of Sir William Woodhouse, a distant cousin of Sir John's wife. Audrey Walsingham was their daughter.
- Anne Shelton
- Alice Shelton
- Mary Shelton
- Thomas Shelton
