= Ambrose Jermyn =

English courtier and magistrate (1511–1577)

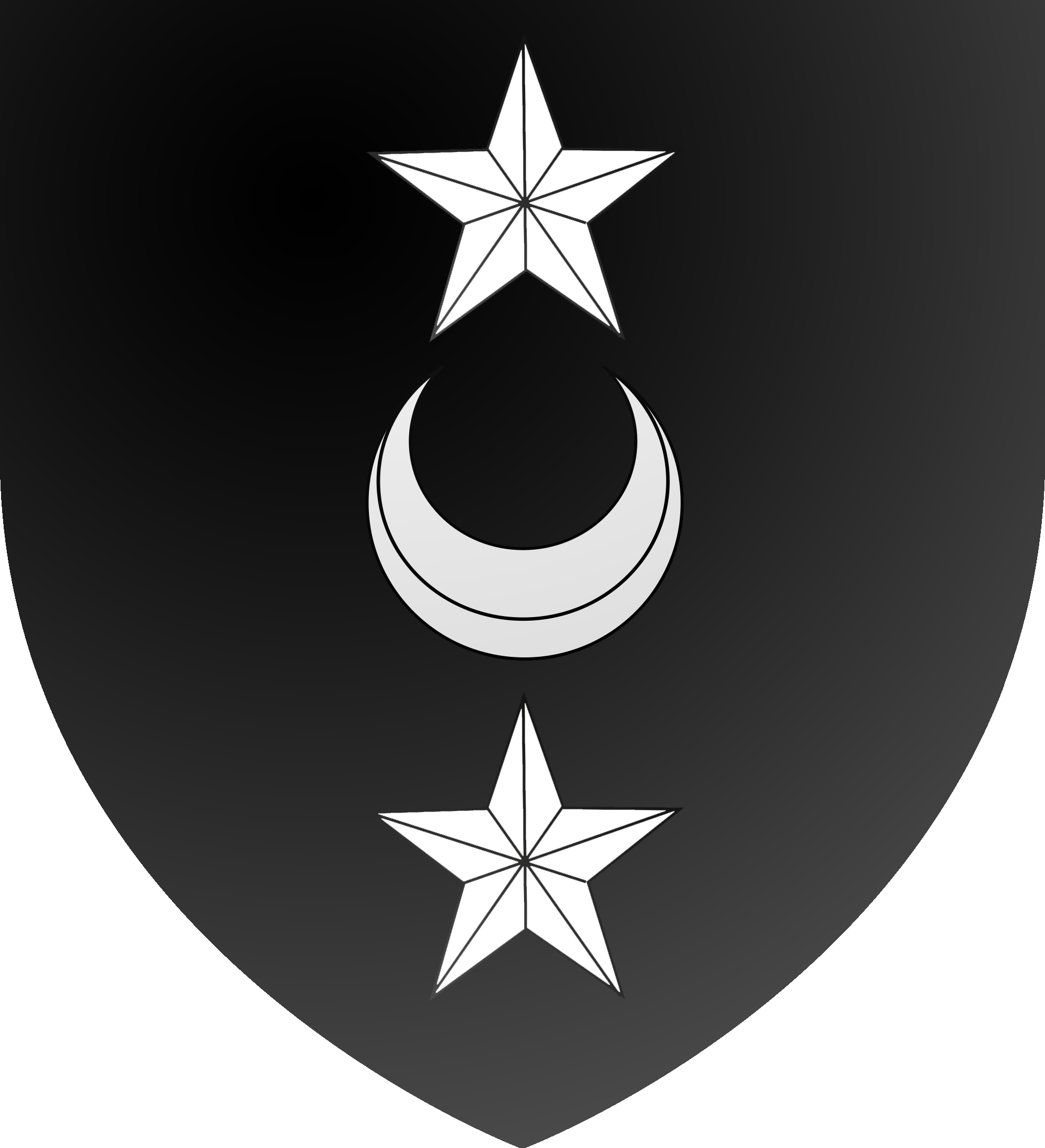
Arms of Jermyn: Sable, a crescent between two mullets in pale argent

Sir Ambrose Jermyn (1511 – 5 April 1577) of Rushbrooke, Suffolk, was an English courtier, magistrate and landowner.

== Origins ==
Jermyn was the son of Sir Thomas Jermyn (died 1552) of Rushbrooke and Anne Spring, the eldest daughter of Thomas Spring of Lavenham, Suffolk.

== Career ==
Jermyn inherited his father's Rushbrooke Hall estate following the elder Jermyn's death in 1552. A fervent Roman Catholic, he was knighted by Queen Mary I and served as a Justice of the Peace in Suffolk. In this role he was a notable prosecutor and persecutor of Protestants across East Anglia until the accession of Queen Elizabeth I. He served as Sheriff of Norfolk and Suffolk in 1558 and 1572.

== Marriage and children ==
In 1538 Jermyn married Anne Heveningham, daughter of George Heveningham of Rushbrooke, and his wife Margaret, daughter of John Burgoyne, the couple had thirteen children, including:

- Robert Jermyn, eldest surviving son and heir, a Protestant magistrate. His will was proved in May 1577.
- John Jermyn, husband of Mary Tollemache, and father of Thomas Jermyn.
- Susan Jermyn, wife of Lyonell Tollemache of Helmingham Hall in Suffolk, and mother of Sir Lionel Tollemache, 1st Baronet (1562–c. 1620).
