= Rushbrooke with Rougham =

Civil parish in Suffolk, England

Coordinates: 52.230°N 0.788°E

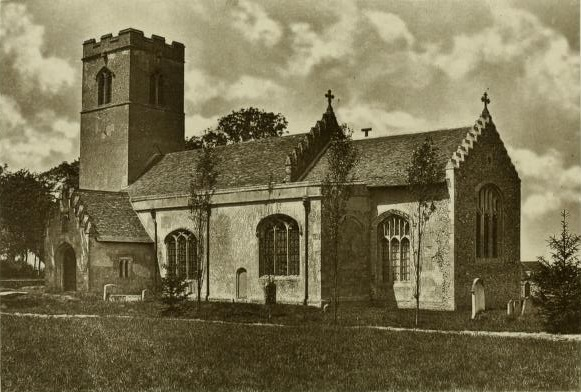
- Rushbrooke Parish Church photograph in 1903

- Location within Suffolk
- Population: 1,140 (2005); 1,200 (2011)
- District: West Suffolk
- Shire county: Suffolk
- Region: East
- Country: England
- Sovereign state: United Kingdom
- Post town: Bury St Edmunds
- Postcode district: IP30
- Police: Suffolk
- Fire: Suffolk
- Ambulance: East of England

Rushbrooke with Rougham is a large civil parish in the West Suffolk district of Suffolk in eastern England covering the villages of Blackthorpe, Rougham and Rushbrooke as well as Rougham Airfield. Located directly south-east of Bury St Edmunds, in 2005 its population was 1,140. One 'Henry of Rushbrook' was Abbot of Bury St Edmunds from 1235 to 1248. The site of a former stately home, Rushbrooke Hall, is situated to the south of Rushbrooke. Until April 2019 it was in the St Edmundsbury district. The parish was created on 1 April 1988 from Rougham and parts of Great Barton, Great Whelnetham and Rushbrooke.
