= Mary Scudamore =

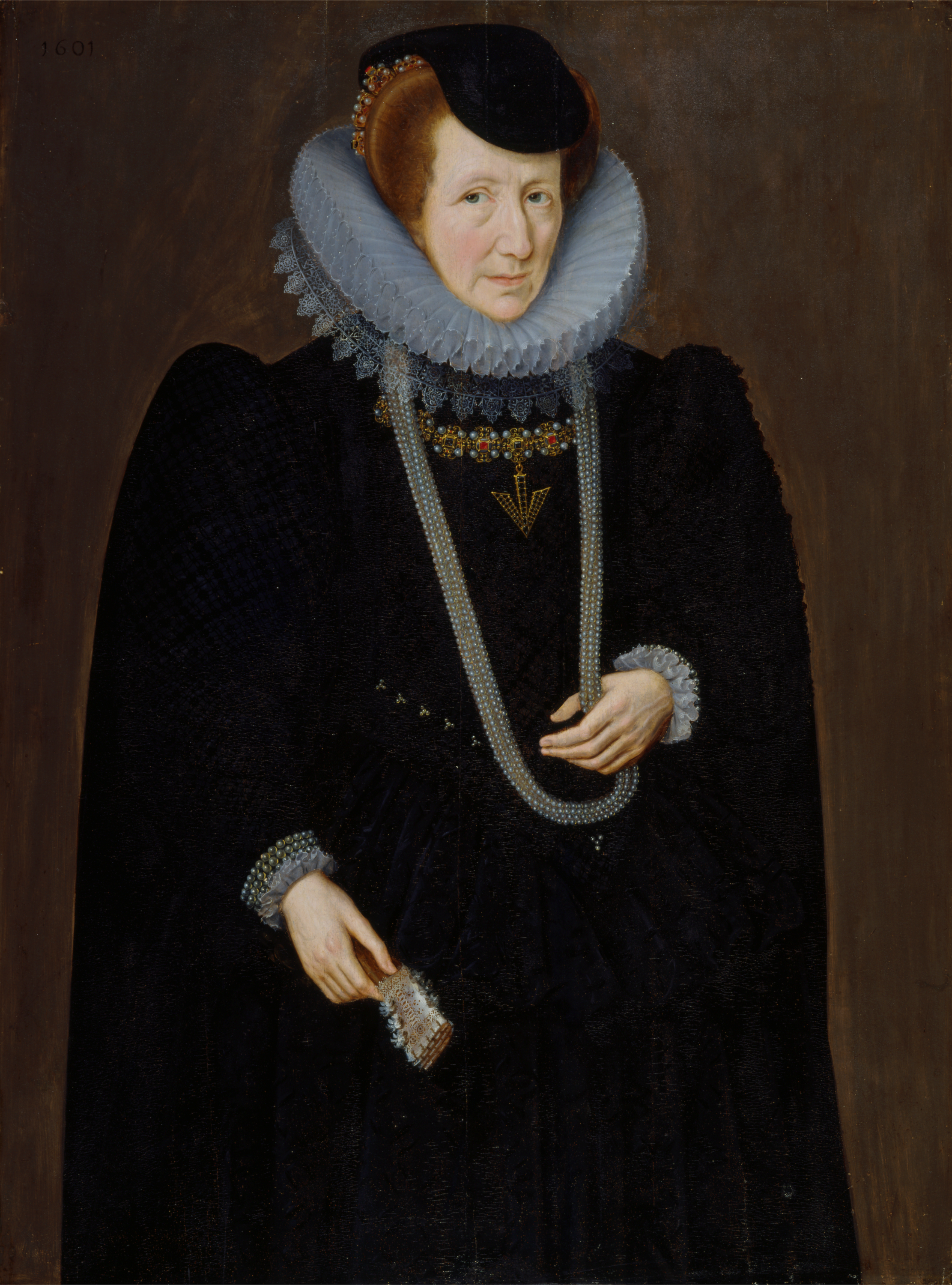
Portrait thought to be Mary Scudamore by Marcus Gheeraerts the Younger, dated 1601.

Mary Scudamore (née Shelton; c. 1550 – 1603) was a courtier to Elizabeth I.

== Life and career ==
She was a daughter of Sir John Shelton of Shelton Hall, Norfolk and his wife, Margaret Parker. She joined the household of Queen Elizabeth around the year 1567, and was appointed a chamberer of the privy chamber on 1 January 1571.

Her family reached the zenith of their influence during the reign of Henry VIII, when Mary's grandparents, Sir John Shelton and Anne Shelton were entrusted with the custody of the future queens Mary I and Elizabeth I, in part because Anne Shelton was the aunt of Anne Boleyn. Also, Mary's aunt, poet Mary Shelton, was the King's mistress.

Mary Scudamore married another courtier, the gentleman usher, Sir John Scudamore of Holme Lacy, Herefordshire. She married him secretly. and their marriage was revealed early in 1575. Elizabeth I was apparently extremely angry that this had been done without her consent, and allegedly attacked Mary, breaking her finger.

A courtier Eleanor Bridges wrote that Elizabeth was liberal both with blows and evil words to Mary Shelton. Eight years later Mary, Queen of Scots, claimed that Bess of Hardwick had told her that Elizabeth had broken Mary Scudamore's finger with a candlestick.

=== Costume at the Elizabethan court ===
In 1571, Mary, as a chamberer, was given an allowance of clothing including satin for a gown, velvet to border and the gown, and sarcenet silk for its lining. Sarcenet was a fine translucent silk fabric. She was to receive similar fabric every year. Some of her clothes were gifts from the queen, made by her tailor Walter Fyshe.

In October 1574, Elizabeth I gave her, "Mistress Mary Skydmore", a gift of a forepart or skirt front. A wardrobe book recorded that she was given for the use of the Queen's dwarf (perhaps Thomazina Muliercula) in October 1579. On 18 February 1584, Elizabeth gave Mary Scudamore a doublet of "spotted satin called sops of wine, cut and embroidered with small flowers and spangles of gold and silver".

As a New Year's Day gift to the Queen in January, 1599, John and Mary Scudamore jointly gave a "loose gown" or night gown of ash-coloured wrought velvet, edged with ermine.
