= Ingoldisthorpe (surname) =

Ingoldisthorpe is a surname. Notable people with the surname include:

- John Ingoldisthorpe (c.1361-1420), English Member of Parliament
- Thomas Ingoldisthorpe (died 1291), Bishop of Rochester
