= Robert fitz Walter of Horsham =

12th century English nobleman

Robert fitz Walter, lord of Horsham was an English nobleman who served as the Sheriff of Norfolk and Suffolk.

== Biography ==
Robert's father, Walter de Caen (a.k.a. Walter de Cadomo, Walter fitz Alberic or Walter de Huntingfield), had been a Domesday Book tenant of Robert Malet, and had, in addition to Robert, two other sons, Ralph and Roger, ancestor of the Huntingfields.

Robert fitz Walter served as Sheriff of Norfolk and Suffolk between 1115 and 1129 and again in 1135. He and his wife Sybil founded the Benedictine Horsham St Faith Priory in 1105.

== Marriage and issue ==
Robert married firstly Sybil, the daughter of Ralph de Chesney, they had the following children:

- Margaret, married Hamo de St. Clair.
- Simon
- Roger
- John, Sheriff of Suffolk and also probably Norfolk, successor to his father. He and his brother William supported the Angevins against King Stephen. John had died without issue before 1149, when his younger brother William confirmed John's foundation of Sibton Abbey.
- William de Chesney, married Gilla, had issue.

Robert married secondly Aveline, daughter of Ernulf de Hesdin and widow of Alan fitz Flaad of Dol. They had two further children:

- Elias
- Peter
