= Margaret Bruce Wells =

British woodcutter (1909–1998)

- Born: Margaret Caroline Bruce; 13 June 1909; Murthly, Perthshire, Scotland
- Died: 4 December 1998 (aged 89); Sibton, Suffolk, England
- Education: Glasgow School of Art; Art Institute of Chicago
- Known for: Printmaking, painting
- Spouse: George Wells (m. 1951)

Margaret Caroline Bruce Wells née Bruce, (13 June 1909 – 4 December 1998) was a British artist known for her use of woodcut and linocut techniques.

== Biography ==
Although born in Murthly in Perthshire, Wells attended Queen Margaret School in Scarborough before returning to Scotland in 1928 to study at the Glasgow School of Art. In 1933 she moved to London to study at the Leon Underwood's Brook Green School. In 1935 Wells became his studio assistant and for a time lived in the Underwood's home. Wells developed a passion for fishing and in 1935 produced two sets of prints on the subject, Fishing for Bleaks and Ells by Night which were both well received. During World War II, Wells served as an ambulance driver and in 1951 she married George Wells, a dermatologist. The couple lived in Chicago for several years during which time Wells studied at the city's Art Institute.

During her career Wells exhibited at the Royal Academy and with the Society of Wood Engravers and became an honorary member of the latter in 1995. She lived in Suffolk for the last two decades of her life and continued working until her death at Sibton. Prints by Wells are held in the collections of the Ashmolean Museum in Oxford, the Victoria and Albert Museum in London, the Art Institute of Chicago and the Hunt Institute for Botanical Documentation at Carnegie-Mellon University in Pittsburgh and in the British Government Art Collection.
