= John Shelton (died 1539) =

Uncle to Queen Anne Boleyn and Governor to Henry VIII's children

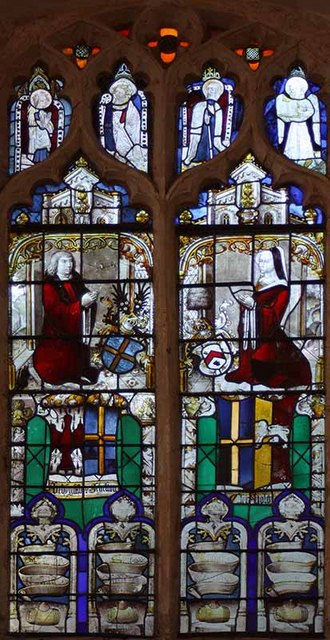
Sir John Shelton and his wife Anne Boleyn, stained glass, St Mary's Church, Shelton, Norfolk

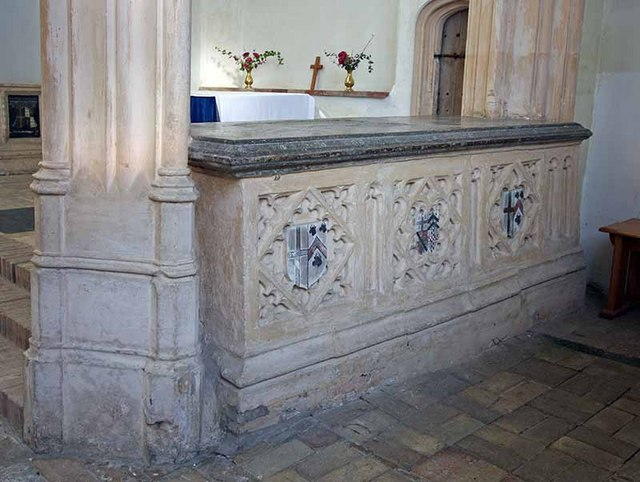
Chest tomb of Sir John Shelton, St Mary's Church, Shelton, Norfolk

Sir John Shelton (1476/7 – 1539) of Shelton in Norfolk, England, was a courtier to King Henry VIII. Through his marriage to Anne Boleyn, a sister and co-heiress of Thomas Boleyn, 1st Earl of Wiltshire of Blickling Hall in Norfolk, he became an uncle of Queen Anne Boleyn, the second wife of King Henry VIII. He was appointed comptroller of the joint household of Princesses Mary and Elizabeth, the king's daughters, and together with his wife was governor to the king's children.

== Life ==
Arms of Shelton: Azure, a cross or

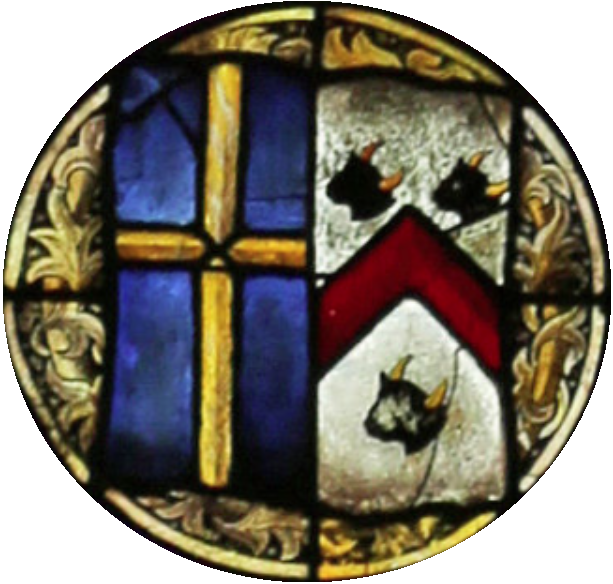
Arms of Shelton impaling Boleyn (Argent, a chevron gules between three bull's heads and necks couped sable armed or), signifying the marriage of Sir John Shelton. Stained glass window in St Mary's Church, Shelton. Also visible on his chest tomb in that church

John Shelton was the son of Ralph Shelton and Margaret Clere, daughter of Robert Clere. John had four siblings: Ralph, Richard, a priest, Elizabeth, and Alice. The family took its name from their Norfolk manor of Shelton, and held lands in East Anglia, including Shelton Hall, for three centuries before John's birth.

Before 1503, Shelton married Anne Boleyn, daughter of Sir William Boleyn of Blickling, Norfolk, and Lady Margaret Butler, daughter of Thomas Butler, 7th Earl of Ormond. Shelton was appointed High Sheriff of Norfolk and Suffolk in 1504 and 1522, and was a Justice of the Peace for Norfolk. At the coronation of Henry VIII, Shelton was created a Knight of the Bath.

Shelton and his wife rose to prominence when Henry VIII married, as his second wife, Lady Shelton's niece, Anne Boleyn, daughter of Lady Shelton's brother, Thomas Boleyn, 1st Earl of Wiltshire. After Queen Anne's coronation in 1533, Lady Shelton and her sister, Lady Alice Clere, were placed in charge of the king's daughter, Mary, at Hatfield Palace. According to Block, this was likely done to pressure Mary to recognise Anne as queen. The enmity and abuse meted out to Mary contributed to everlasting hatred between the Tudor court factions.

By July 1536, Shelton was comptroller of the household established for Mary and Anne Boleyn's daughter, Elizabeth. Shelton and his wife were given the joint titles of governor and governess of the Princess Elizabeth, responsible for her upbringing and education, after her mother's execution. It was to Shelton the little Elizabeth uttered the words:

How haps it, Governor, yesterday my Lady Princess, and today but my Lady Elizabeth?

after her mother's fall.

In August 1536, the king was reunited with his daughters at Hunsdon House, a month after Queen Anne's beheading. There is no evidence that Shelton was involved with family intrigues or of the king's dissatisfaction. On 22 November 1538 he was granted the site of the former Carrow Abbey just outside Norwich. This property became the family seat.

== Death ==
Shelton died on 21 December 1539 at the age of 62, and was buried in the chancel of Shelton church. He was said to have been "a man of great possessions", which he sought to pass on to his heirs contrary to the Statute of Uses. When the stratagem came to light after Shelton's death, the lawyers involved were punished, and an act of Parliament (33 Hen. 8. c. 26) was passed annulling such "crafty conveyances".

== Issue ==
Shelton had three sons and seven daughters: Margaret, John, Mary, Ralph, Thomas, Anne, Gabriella, Elizabeth, Amy, and Emma. His son and heir, John Shelton, married Margaret, the daughter of Henry Parker, 10th Baron Morley. His daughter Anne married Edmund Knyvet. Another daughter, Margaret, married Thomas Wodehouse. His daughter Mary married first Anthony Heaveningham, and second, Philip Appleyard, the half-brother of Amy Robsart. One of his daughters, thought to be either Margaret or Mary, was said to have been a mistress of King Henry VIII.

=== Likenesses ===
In 1528 the Shelton family sat for the court painter Hans Holbein.
