= Thomas Jermyn (died 1552) =

English politician and landowner (died 1552)

Sir Thomas Jermyn (c. 1482 – 8 October 1552) was an English politician and landowner.

== Biography ==
He was the son of Thomas Jermyn and Catherine Bernard. He served as Sheriff of Norfolk and Suffolk in 1530 and 1541. On 10 March 1540, he was knighted by Henry VIII and granted a coat-of-arms. Jermyn lived at Rushbrooke Hall, which he demolished and remodelled in the late 1540s.

He married first Anne Spring (1494–1528), daughter of Thomas Spring of Lavenham, by whom he was the father of Sir Ambrose Jermyn. He married secondly Anne Drury, widow of Sir George Waldegrave, esquire (c. 1483 – 8 July 1528) of Smallbridge, Suffolk and daughter of Sir Robert Drury (speaker). He left a lengthy will, proved 16 December 1552.
