= Sibton Abbey =

Former Cistercian abbey in Suffolk

Coordinates: 52°16′32″N 1°27′56″E

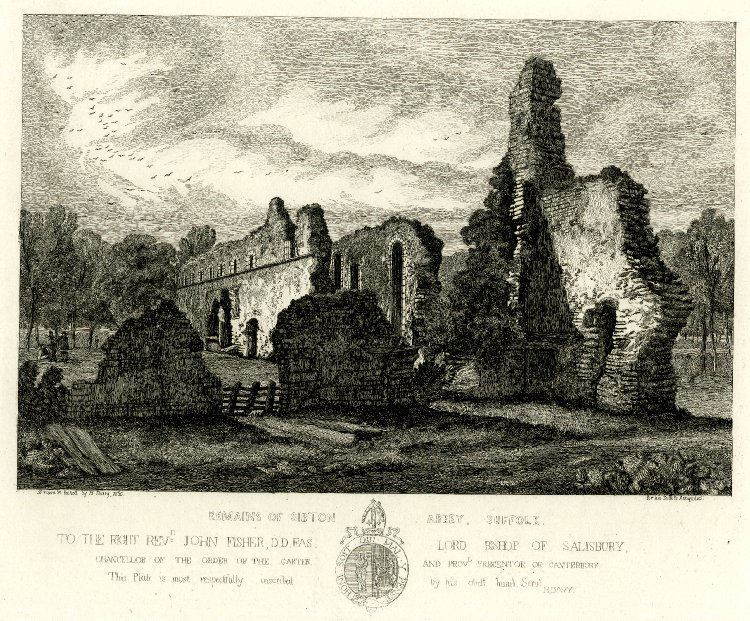
Remains of Sibton Abbey, etching by Henry Davy, 1827.

Sibton Abbey, an early Cistercian abbey located in Sibton near Yoxford, Suffolk, was founded about 1150 by William de Chesney, High Sheriff of Norfolk and Suffolk. The Abbey is a daughter house of Warden Abbey, near Bedford, Bedfordshire. It was the only Cistercian abbey in East Anglia. It was dissolved in 1536.

== The foundation legend ==
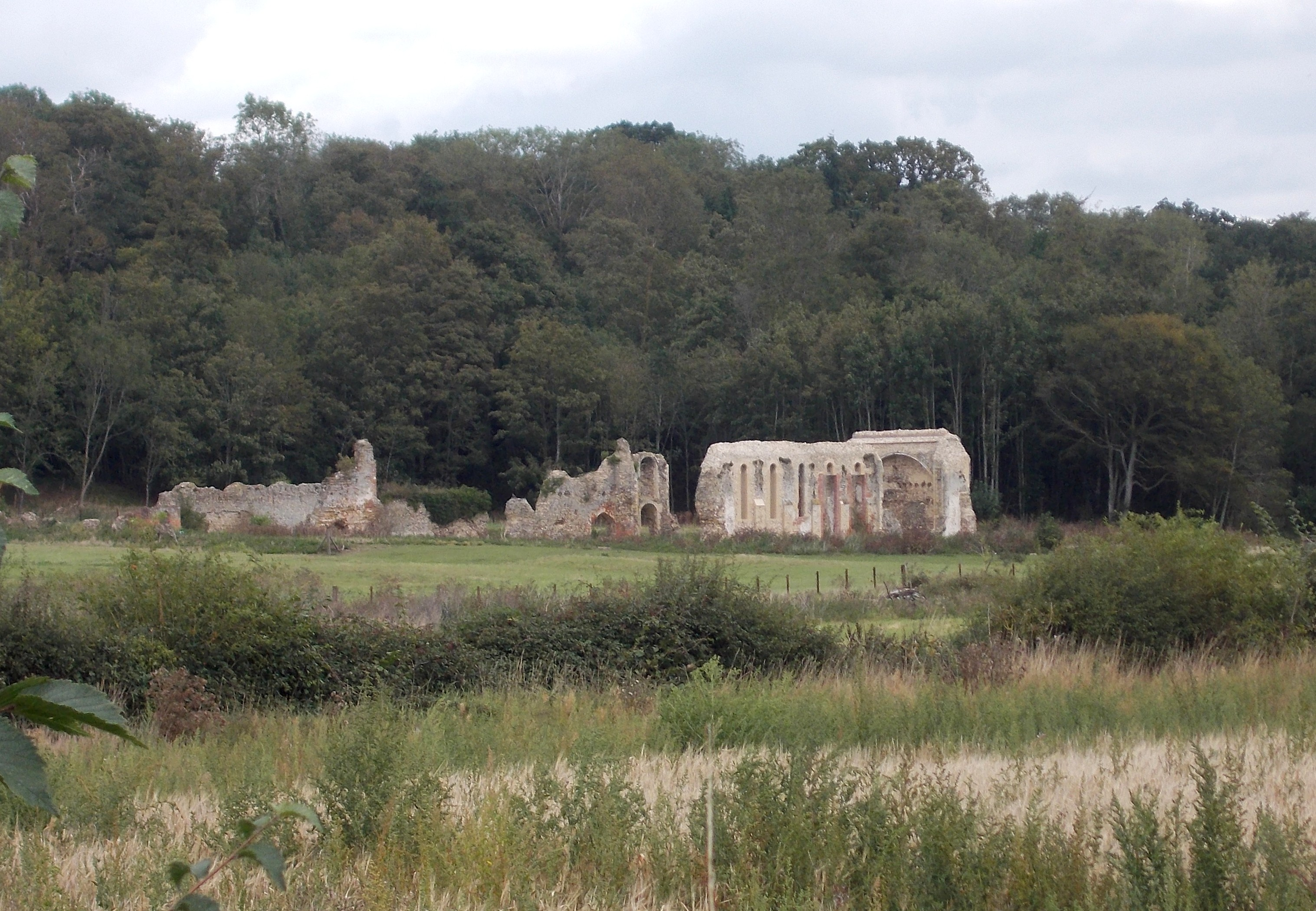
A general view of Sibton Abbey ruins from the south-west

A medieval narrative of the abbey's foundation told, that Walter de Cadomo (i.e. Walter de Caen) came to England in the time of the Conqueror with Robert Malet, Lord of the Honour of Eye and High Sheriff of Norfolk and Suffolk, and Walter held the Barony of Horsford (not really a barony but a large group of landholdings centred upon Horsford Castle in Norfolk) from him as from the Honour of Eye. Walter's son and heir Robert fitz Walter (who married Sybil de Caisneto) founded the church of St Peter at Sibton in the time of William Rufus, and had three sons, Roger, John and William, of whom Roger and John had no offspring.

When Robert (who in 1105 also founded the Benedictine priory of Horsham St Faith nearby) died, his son John, afterwards called John vicecomes (i.e., the Sheriff), inherited the Barony of Horsford. After some time, when he was stricken with a grave illness, he bethought himself to construct a Cistercian abbey in atonement for his many evil deeds both in times of peace and war. Knowing that he could not live long, he made his brother and heir William (William de Chesney, or William de Cayneto) promise to perform what he had vowed, to complete and construct the Cistercian abbey. Then after John died, William held the barony, and after some time ruled the county as William vicecomes. He, mindful of the welfare of his brother's soul, fulfilled his promise and founded the abbey of St Mary of Sibton, granting his lands at Sibton and his charter of confirmation dated 1149.

== The medieval abbey ==
Sibton Abbey of the Blessed Virgin Mary was founded with the normal complement of 13 monks, but by the thirteenth century the numbers of monks and lay brothers had grown, and the Abbey had grown rich, owning lands across southeast England, including twelve relatively small granges in Norfolk, Suffolk and on the borders of Cambridgeshire, as well as possessions within 10 parishes of the city of Norwich. From the beginning of the thirteenth century the Abbey also hosted a hospital at its gate dedicated to St. John the Baptist which cared for the sick.

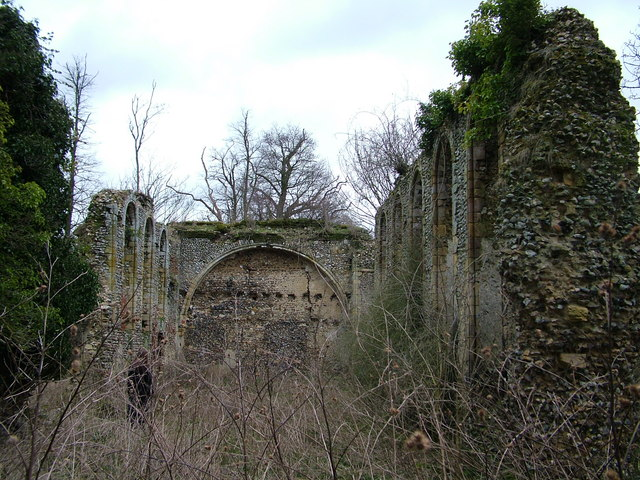
Ruins of Sibton Abbey's Refectory, looking east

Sibton's architectural style was in the austere Cistercian original model, but was not devoid of ornamentation. The principal standing ruins are those of the Frater or Refectory hall of the convent, and are from the mid-12th-century phase of construction, in the late Norman or Romanesque style. The convent church, which had a central crossing, stood on the north side of the cloister, and on the east side (extending south from the south transept) was the range including the dormitory with its undercroft.

Sibton is unusual among Cistercian houses in that the Frater (the standing ruin) formed most of the south range, aligned east and west, with the screens passage and kitchens at its western end and the dais for the high table at the east, where the great blank arch still remains in the end wall. (The Frater should normally extend at right-angles to the south range.) On the west side of the cloister was a wall separating it from an open area or lane, beyond which the western range (the Cellarium) stood. This was possibly the domain of the lay brethren, separate from the enclosed brethren in holy orders, who together made up the conventual community.

== Economic basis ==
Sibton grew rich on proceeds from various forms of husbandry, and from the wool trade which built so many grand English churches. Although Suffolk wool was not of the finest quality, according to some historians, often stained with tar or grease, it was nevertheless in great demand, particularly in East Anglia, which had many Flemish weavers anxious to convert it into exportable cloth. The abbey's various mills, of which there were at least 15 on their outlying Suffolk estates during the 13th century, both watermills and windmills, were maintained to mill grain on economic principles quite unlike those of later periods.

=== Mills belonging to the Abbey ===
The Abbey was granted 14 mills between 1163 and 1364:

- Kennett Watermill, Kennett, Cambridgeshire
- Calcmelnes Mill, Norwich
- Tostock Windmill, Tostock, Suffolk
- Dunwich Watermill, Dunwich Suffolk
- Walpole Watermill, Walpole, Suffolk
- Darnford Watermill,
- Fengysmyll
- Wenhaston Watermill, Wenhaston
- Thwaite Windmill,
- Rendham Windmill,
- Cookley Windmill, Cookley, Suffolk
- Instead II Watermill,
- Weybread Watermill

The Abbey built Sibton Windmill on its own land in 1363-4.

== Books and artefacts ==
The 14th-century bibliographer Henry of Kirkestede, of Bury St Edmunds, saw a copy of the Chronicon of Ralph of Coggeshall from Sibton. A 15th-century navicula de Venetiis (a type of portable sundial) found near the Abbey in 1989 is now in the National Maritime Museum.

== Dissolution ==
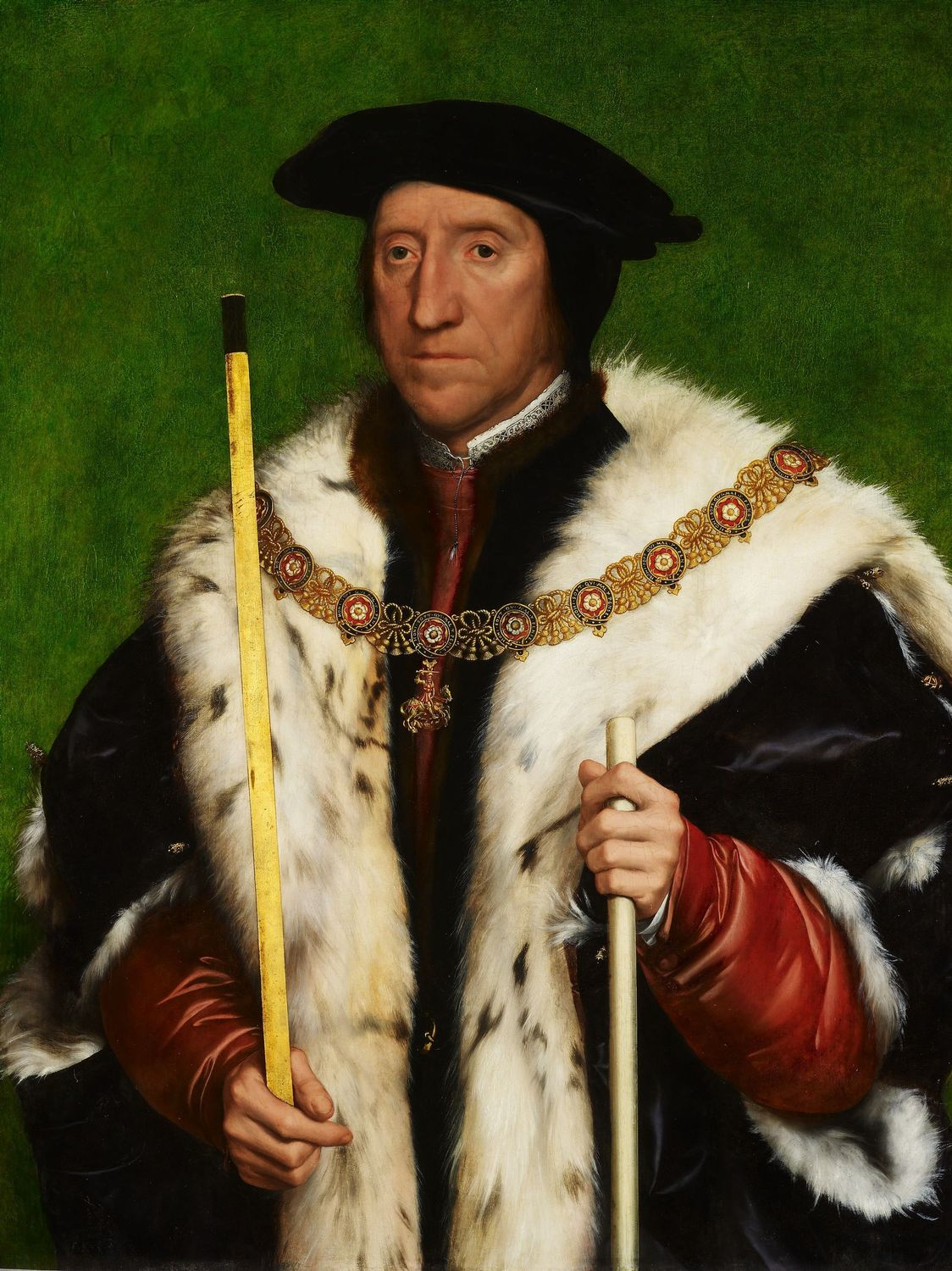
Thomas Howard, 3rd Duke of Norfolk, who pressed for the dissolution of Sibton Abbey

At the time of the Dissolution of the Monasteries, when it is noted that Thomas Fiennes, 9th Baron Dacre (then aged about 20) was patron as heir to William de Chesney, Sibton Abbey's annual income was £250. This substantial sum ought to have allowed the Abbey an additional couple of years before it was dissolved. But the recently appointed Abbot William Flatbury, installed at the insistence of the Duke of Norfolk, apparently was prevailed upon by the Duke and by Thomas Cromwell, 1st Earl of Essex, to hasten the Dissolution, and yield the jewel to those in Royal favour. The engineering of Flatbury's appointment, according to a contemporaneous observer, had been done with the "connivance of Cromwell on purpose to bring about a speedy surrender."

In 1536 the Abbey with all its appurtenances was transferred by deed by the abbot and brethren to Thomas Howard, 3rd Duke of Norfolk, and to Anthony Rous his marshal and Nicholas Hare. The Duke subsequently sold the Abbey again to Thomas Godsalve, who in turn sold it to Thomas Howard, 1st Earl of Suffolk.

== Post-Dissolution ==
In 1610 the Abbey and Manor were sold to John Scrivener, son of Ralph Scrivener, an Ipswich barrister grown rich in the wool trade, and the family built an estate nearby. John Scrivener's brother Matthew was an early Governor of the Virginia Colony, where he drowned in 1609. John Scrivener's sister Elizabeth was married to Harbottle Wingfield of Crowfield Hall, Suffolk, cousin of Edward Maria Wingfield, the first President of the Jamestown Colony. John Scrivener's son, Thomas Scrivener Esq., married Mary Bedingfield, only daughter and heir of William Bedingfield, of Fressingfield, Suffolk and a relation of Sir Henry Bedingfield.

The two conspicuous rows of joist holes cut into the great archway of the eastern refectory wall are intended to support an upper floor or gallery, probably inserted after the suppression when the building was converted to secular uses.

== 21st century ==
Sibton Abbey is considered a picturesque ruin, largely overgrown, with the refectory and the south wall of the nave still visible. Major repairs were made under the Countryside Stewardship Scheme in 2019. These repairs were carried out by the local architect, Tim Buxbaum The Abbey and the Manor were inherited through his mother by Egerton Bagot Byrd Levett-Scrivener.

Many of the cartularies of the old Abbey were transferred to the East Suffolk Record Office by J.E. Levett-Scrivener Esq., who also transferred some of the Abbey's early medieval music.

The Levett-Scrivener family have sometimes made the ruins available to county historical societies and historians. The Abbey ruins are a scheduled monument. The site is not open to the public.
