= Sibton =

Village in Suffolk, England

Coordinates: 52.273°N 1.467°E

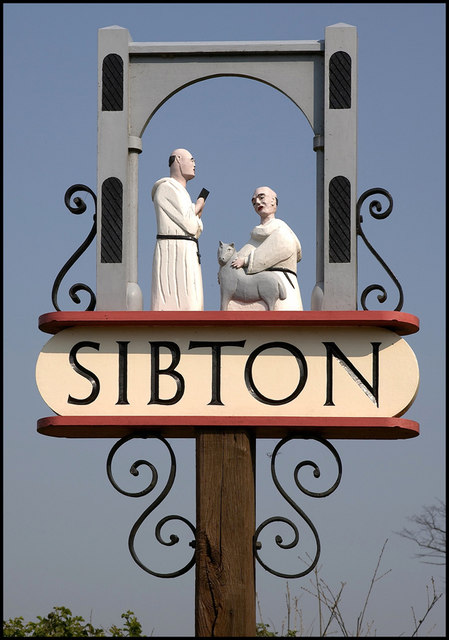
- Sibton village sign portrays Sibton Abbey

- Location within Suffolk
- Population: 182 (2011 Census)
- OS grid reference: TM360695
- District: East Suffolk
- Shire county: Suffolk
- Region: East
- Country: England
- Sovereign state: United Kingdom
- Post town: SAXMUNDHAM
- Postcode district: IP17
- Dialling code: 01728
- Police: Suffolk
- Fire: Suffolk
- Ambulance: East of England
- UK Parliament: Suffolk Coastal

Sibton is a village and civil parish on the A1120 road, in the East Suffolk district, in the English county of Suffolk. It is near the towns of Saxmundham and Halesworth, the village of Peasenhall and the hamlet of Sibton Green. The church is dedicated to St Peter; there is also the remains of a medieval abbey, Sibton Abbey. There is a large stately house set in the grounds of Sibton Park which dates back 1827 in the Georgian period, which is now used as a hotel. The estate consists of 4500 acres, being part of the Wilderness Reserve where there are holiday cottages and a lake. The Parish is also near the River Yox which runs past the White Horse Inn and down through Pouy Street, it then goes on past both the A1120 road and a small, wooded area called Abbey Woods to pass through the grounds of Sibton Park and then on to Yoxford.

== History ==
The name Sibton derives from Old English, where the word "Sibba" is a personal name and the word "tun" means an enclosure, a farm, village or an estate, essentially meaning "Sibba's farm or settlement". Sibton was recorded in the Domesday Book of 1086 with a population of just 51 people.

Sibton Abbey was founded as a Cistercian daughter house of Warden Abbey, Bedfordshire in the 1150s.

In the 1870s, Sibton was described as

a parish in Blything district, Suffolk; 2½ miles WNW of Yoxford r. station, and 4½ N by W of Saxmundham. Post town, Yoxford, under Saxmundham. Acres, 2,861. Real property, £4,824. Pop., 489. Houses, 101. S. Park is the seat of J. W. Brooke, Esq.

In 1885 an exclave of the parish was reassigned to Peasenhall.

In 1901 the population was 418, and the parish covered 2770 acres.

== Occupations ==
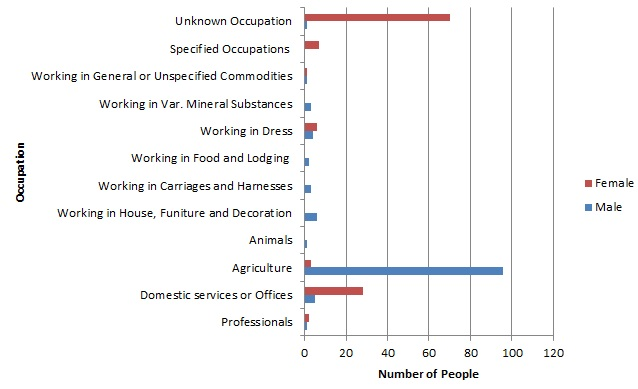
Occupations of the residents of the civil parish of Sibton, Suffolk, in 1881. The data has been taken from the 1881 census of England and Wales

The graph shows the occupations of the citizens of Sibton in 1881 and the main occupation was in agricultural work, with 96 men and three women working in this sector. The second highest sector was in domestic service or offices. Census information from 1831 states that nearly three quarters (91 people) of Sibton's population was a labourer or a servant and 21 people were employers or professionals. This is similar to the 1881 occupation statistics which showed that 99 people worked in agriculture, which is a similar figure for how many labourers there were in 1831 suggesting there was little change in these years. However, in 2011 the occupation statistics of the parish were very different, with just seven people working in agriculture. The highest sector of employment for Sibton in 2011 was people working in accommodation or food industry, with fifteen people working in this industry.

== Population ==
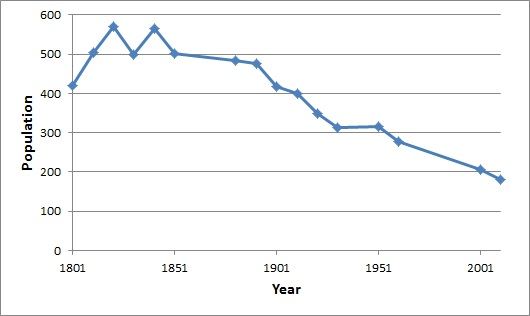
Total population of the parish of Sibton, Suffolk, taken from the Census of Population from 1801 to 2011.

According to the 2011 census Sibton had a population of 182- 96 of these people being male and 86 being female. This is the lowest the population has been since census records began in 1801.The population hit a peak in 1821, when there were 569 people living in the parish. Since then, the population fluctuated slightly between the years of 1821 and 1841 but has continued to decrease since then. One reason for this drastic change was due to a boundary change of the parish, which was in 1885 when part of Sibton became part of Peasenhall. This change was recorded in the 1891 census and meant the parish size was reduced. A continued decrease in population has also occurred as people became less dependent on farming as their main source of income and many people also moved towards the bigger towns, such as Ipswich, for work.

In 2011, 159 people living in Sibton were over the age of 16 and 23 people were under the age of 16, with the mean age being 48.6. 56 people in the parish had qualifications of level 4 and above.

== St Peter's Church ==
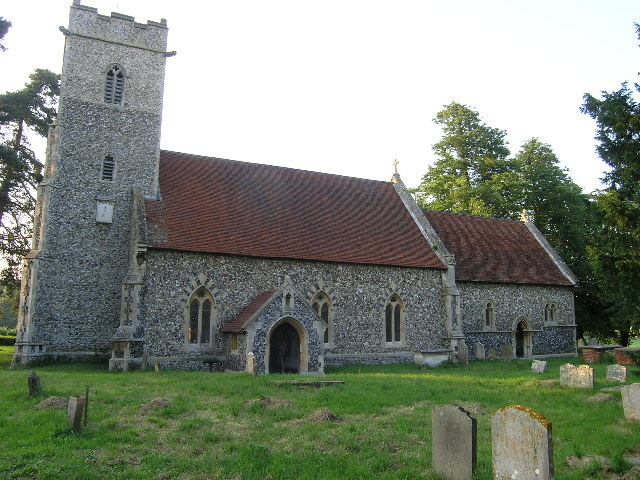
St Peter's Church

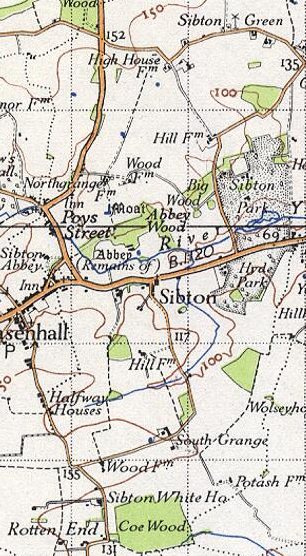
Map of Sibton (1945)

St Peter's Church at Sibton lies above the busy A1120 road and was founded in the reign of William II (c.1100) by Robert de Camodo. The oldest part of the building is the south door, which was made in the Norman era and was originally part of Sibton Abbey. The church once had a spire which was added, along with a tower, in the 15th century. However, this spire came down about 200 years ago, although the tower still remains. After being out of use for many years the church has recently been restored, and £50,000 was raised to repair part of the roof; a further £45,000 was given by English Heritage which has helped the church regain its parish status, and regular services now take place.

== War memorial ==
The parish's war memorial is located at the entrance to the churchyard in the form of a lychgate. Eleven men from Sibton lost their lives in the First World War; their names are carved into the memorial. Two of the men are buried in the graveyard. During the Second World War, a further two men lost their lives, and their names were added to the memorial.

== Notable residents ==
- Peter Purves (1939- ); television presenter and actor.
- Nicholas Clay (1946–2000); actor.
- Margaret Bruce Wells (1909–1998); artist who specialised in woodcut and linocut techniques.
- Egerton Bagot Byrd Levett-Scrivener (1857–1954); Royal Navy Flag Lieutenant.
