= Rougham, Suffolk =

Village in Suffolk, England

Coordinates: 52.228398°N 0.798164°E

Rougham
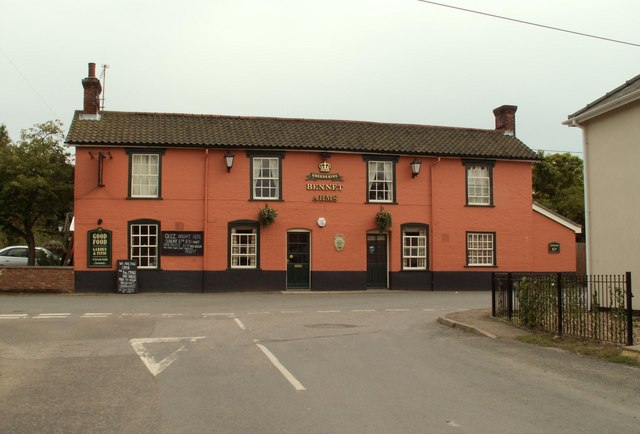
- Bennet Arms public house

- Location within Suffolk
- OS grid reference: TL912626
- Civil parish: Rushbrooke with Rougham
- District: West Suffolk
- Shire county: Suffolk
- Region: East
- Country: England
- Sovereign state: United Kingdom
- Police: Suffolk
- Fire: Suffolk
- Ambulance: East of England

Rougham is a village and former civil parish 19 miles (31 km) north west of Ipswich, now in the parish of Rushbrooke with Rougham, in the West Suffolk district, in the county of Suffolk, England. Until April 2019 Rougham was in the St Edmundsbury district. In 1961 the parish had a population of 777. Rougham is also a ward, in 2011 the ward had a population of 2341. The ward touches Chadacre, Thurston, Rattlesden, The Fornhams & Great Barton, Moreton Hall, Lavenham, Horringer and Southgate. Rougham is pronounced "Ruff'm". In 1958 the parish had settlements at Mouse Lane estate, Rougham Green, Kingshall Street and Chapmans Close.

== Features ==
Rougham has a church called St Mary's Church which is at least half a mile from the village and a school called Rougham C of E Primary School on Church Road.

== History ==
The name "Rougham" means 'Homestead/village on rough ground'. Rougham was recorded in the Domesday Book as Ruhham. On 1 April 1988 the parish was abolished and Rushbrooke with Rougham was created.
