= Devonshire manuscript =

Collection of early modern English poetry

- British Library, London (Additional MS 17492)
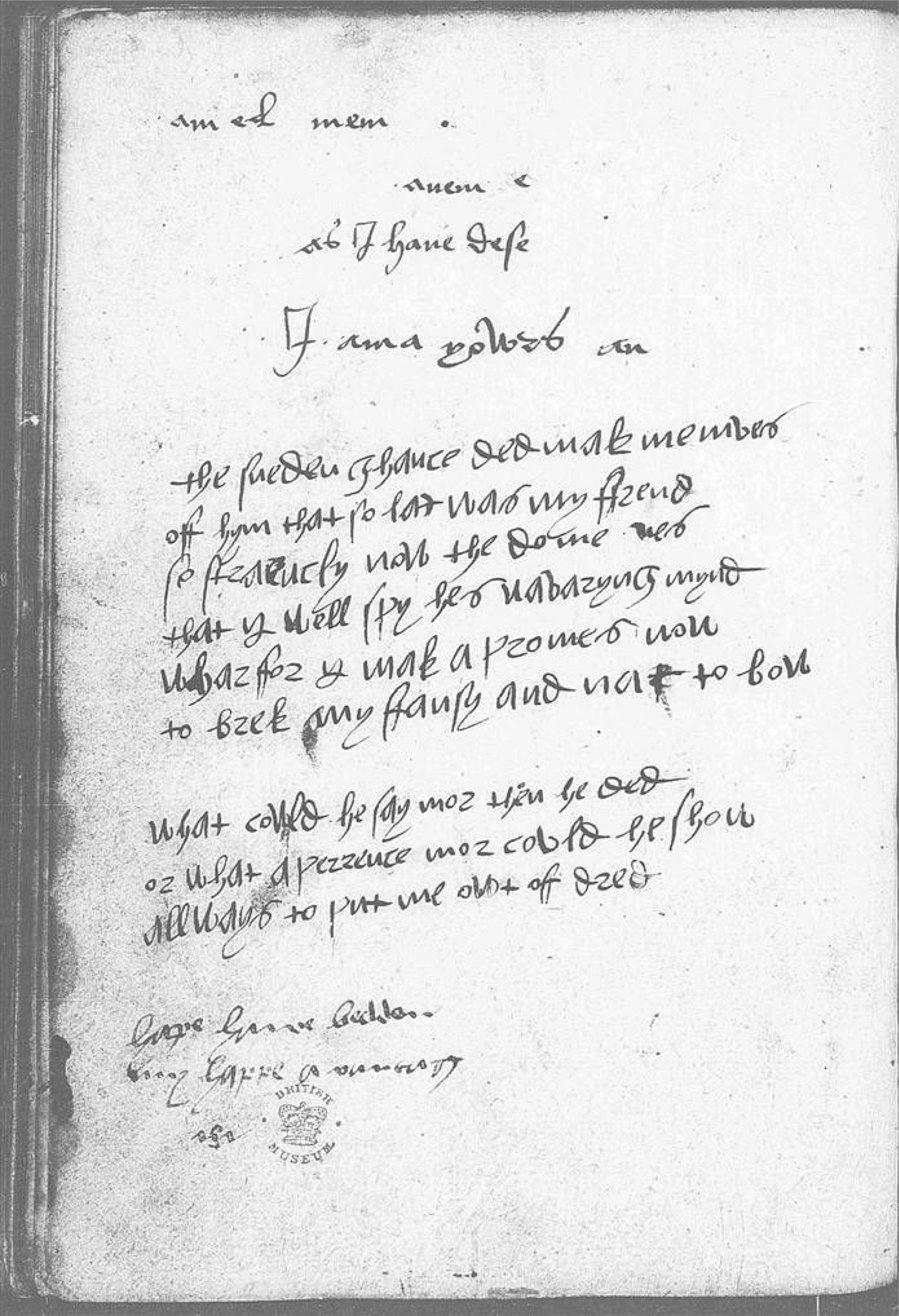
- The Devonshire Manuscript facsimile 67v
- Type: Miscellany
- Date: c. 1530s–early 1540s (with later sixteenth-century additions)
- Place of origin: London, England; Court Of Henry VIII
- Scribes: Mary Fitzroy (née Howard); Lady Margaret Douglas; Mary Shelton; Henry Stuart, Lord Darnley (later addition)
- Authors: Sir Thomas Wyatt (majority); Geoffrey Chaucer (extracts); Thomas Hoccleve (extracts); Richard Roos (extracts); Lord Thomas Howard; Lady Margaret Douglas; Mary Shelton; Mary Fitzroy (née Howard); Henry Stuart, Lord Darnley (later addition)
- Material: Paper; iron gall ink
- Size: 23 cm × 15.5 cm (9.1 in × 6.1 in); 96 folios (192 sides)
- Format: Quarto, single column
- Condition: Original 16th-century blind-tooled leather binding; some excised and inserted leaves, minor staining and wear
- Contents: Tudor verse miscellany (c. 190 poems) curated,edited and co -authored by Mary Shelton, Mary Fitzroy, and Lady Margaret Douglas, featuring Sir Thomas Wyatt, courtly verse, and medieval excerpts (Geoffrey Chaucer, Thomas Hoccleve, Richard Roos) and one line written and signed by Henry Stuart, Lord Darnley (later addition)

The Devonshire manuscript (British Library, Add. MS 17492) is a verse miscellany from the 1530s and early 1540s compiled by three women at the court of Anne Boleyn: Mary Shelton, Mary Fitzroy (née Howard), and Lady Margaret Douglas.

While it includes original compositions, transcriptions, fragments, and extracts from medieval poets such as Geoffrey Chaucer, Thomas Hoccleve, and Richard Roos, most of the recorded verse is attributed to Sir Thomas Wyatt, including many poems unique to the manuscript. It is a significant textual witness to Wyatt's poetry as well as a artefact for studying women's literary activity and manuscript circulation in early Tudor England.
