= Egerton Bagot Byrd Levett-Scrivener =

British Navy lieutenant (1857–1954)

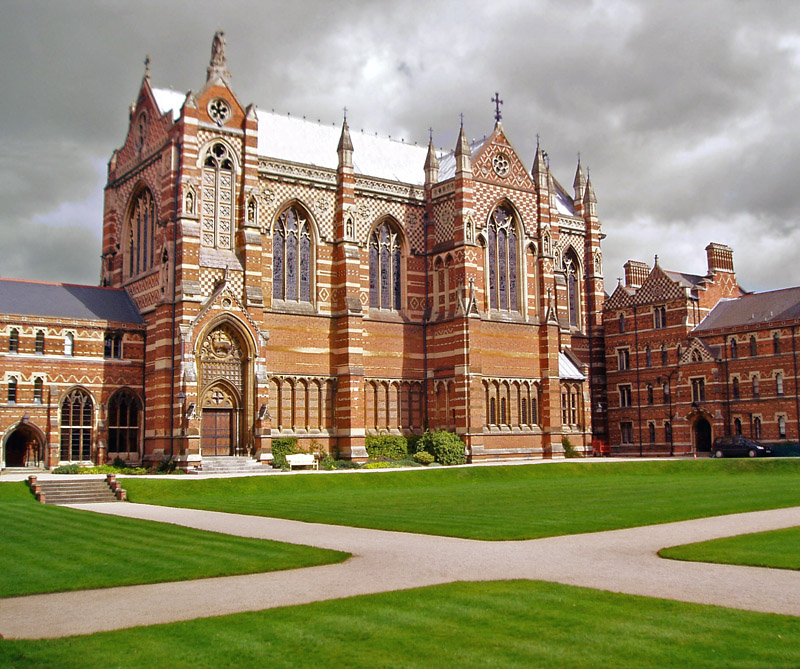
Keble College, Oxford, where retired RN Capt. Levett-Scrivener served as Bursar

coat of arms : quarterly Levett and Scrivener

Captain Egerton Bagot Byrd Levett-Scrivener (1857–1954) was a Royal Navy Flag Lieutenant and aide to Vice Admiral George Willes in the Far East. He was later promoted to Captain, and following his retirement became Bursar of Keble College, University of Oxford. Born Egerton Levett, he changed his name to Levett-Scrivener on an inheritance from his aunt of Scrivener family properties at Sibton Abbey, Suffolk, which he later managed. Levett was married to the daughter of English diplomat and ambassador Sir Harry Smith Parkes.

== Life ==
Egerton Levett was the son of Col. Richard Byrd Levett of Milford Hall, Staffordshire and his wife Elizabeth Mary (Mirehouse) Levett. Egerton Levett entered the service of the Royal Navy, where during a posting as aide to Admiral Willes in 1884, he met Mabel Desborough Parkes, the daughter of Ambassador Parkes, who was then serving as British ambassador to China and Korea. Levett and Miss Parkes were married in 1884, and in 1885 their son Evelyn Harry Byrd Levett was born, prompting Ambassador Parkes to write "one of his happiest letters... written in January 1885 to his daughter, Mrs. Levett, on the memorable occasion when he became a grandfather."

In 1889, Levett inherited the Sibton Abbey Estate with the Lord of the Manorship Sibton with the Members from his aunt. The property, which was the only Cistercian abbey in East Anglia, had been in the Scrivener family since its purchase in the early seventeenth century by John Scrivener, son of an Ipswich barrister and bailiff grown rich in the wool trade. The Scrivener family later purchased 20,000 acres (81 km^{2}) from the Duke of Norfolk to add to their Suffolk holdings. After inheriting Sibton Abbey, Egerton Levett changed his name to Levett-Scrivener in accordance with his aunt's wishes.

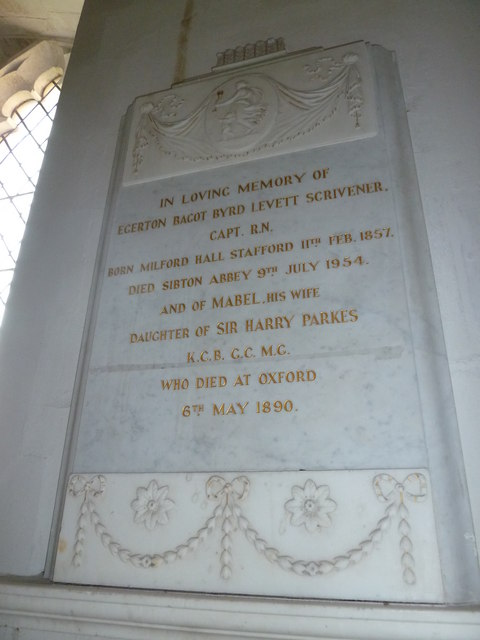
Memorial to Egerton Bagot Byrd Levett-Scrivener, St Peter's Church, Sibton, Suffolk

In 1890, six years after their marriage, Levett's wife Mabel was killed in a fall from her horse. A year later, in 1891, Levett married in Bristol his cousin Mary Millicent Mirehouse. (Levett's mother was a Mirehouse, and his brother Richard Byrd Levett ultimately also changed his name to Richard Walter Byrd Mirehouse on succeeding to Mirehouse family property at The Hall, Angle, Pembrokeshire, where by-then Richard W.B. Mirehouse served as High Sheriff of Pembrokeshire as well as Lieutenant Colonel of 4th Batt. North Staffs Regiment.)

Levett-Scrivener became an avid agriculturalist and farmer on the Sibton Abbey estate. He improved the farmland, and studied the manorial records of the Sibton properties, which were still in family hands, and shared them with historians. Levett-Scrivener tracked the produce grown on the farms, the cost of labor and the rentals accruing to the Scrivener owners. He also opened the Abbey periodically to county historians and antiquarians so they could investigate the ruins of the once-wealthy abbey, which had fallen during the Dissolution of the Monasteries to the Howard family.

Royal Navy Captain Egerton Bagot Byrd Levett-Scrivener died in 1954. He was survived by one son from his first marriage and three daughters from his second marriage, Iris, Winnifred and Pamela.

== Extended family ==
The Levett-Scrivener family has longstanding ties to the Royal Navy. Egerton Levett-Scrivener's son Evelyn Harry Byrd, also joined the Royal Navy, where he rose to the rank of Commander and predeceased his father on 22 August 1950. He had two full siblings, Egerton Alaric Parkes Levett-Scrivener, named in part for his grandfather Parkes, and a sister Dorothy who died in infancy, and the three were baptized at the Berkswich, Staffordshire, church where their father Levett-Scrivener worshipped as a child.

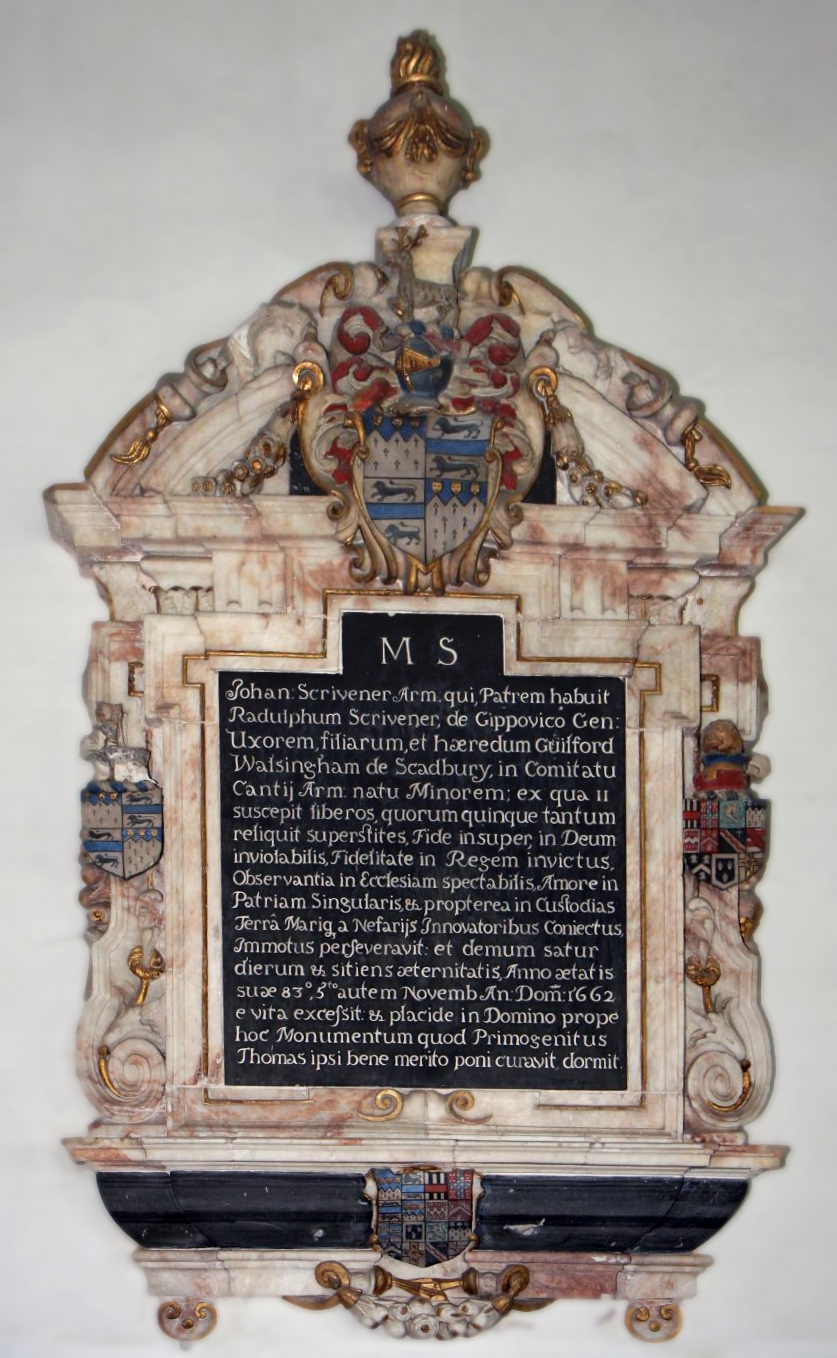
Monument to John Scrivener of Sibton Abbey, St Peter's Church, Sibton, Suffolk

The Levett-Scriveners, and most of their Scrivener relatives, are buried at St. Peter's Church in Sibton, near Yoxford, Suffolk. In 2005, the Levett-Scrivener family felt compelled to purchase the local village post office and shop facing closure in this quiet corner of rural England.

Egerton Bagot Byrd Levett-Scrivener's great-great grandfather, John Freston Scrivener, was a cousin of Horatio Nelson. Among the ancestors of the Levett-Scrivener family is Admiral William Bligh.

== Sources ==
- The Levetts of Staffordshire, Dyonese Levett Haszard, Milford, Staffordshire, privately printed
