= Robert Blund =

11th-century Norman Sheriff of Norfolk

Sheriff of Norfolk
- In office before 1086 – c. 1122

Personal details
- Children: Gilbert

Robert Blund (born C. 11th century) was a Norman nobleman and Sheriff of Norfolk after the Norman Conquest of England.

Blund was named in Domesday Book as the Sheriff of Norfolk, so he held that office sometime before 1086, when Domesday was compiled. Blund was also the lord of Ashfield in Suffolk, and is considered to have been the feudal baron of Ashfield.

Domesday Book states that Blund inherited his lands in Suffolk from his brother, who was named Ralph.

Blund's heir was his son Gilbert, who had inherited the fiefs by sometime in the reign of King Henry I of England. Besides his son, Blund had at least two daughters, who were married to William of Audley and Robert de Albamara. Another possible relative was Gilbert Blund, who held lands from Robert Malet.
