= William de Chesney (sheriff) =

12th-century Anglo-Norman nobleman and sheriff

Sheriff of Norfolk
- In office between 1146 and 1149 – between 1146 and 1153

Sheriff of Suffolk
- In office between 1146 and 1149 – between 1146 and 1153

Sheriff of Norfolk
- In office 1156–1162

Sheriff of Suffolk
- In office 1156–1163

Personal details
- Died: 1174
- Spouse: Gilla
- Children: Margaret; Clemence; Sara

William de Chesney (Note: Sometimes William of Norwich or William fitzRobert) (died 1174) was a medieval Anglo-Norman nobleman and sheriff. The son of a landholder in Norfolk, William inherited after the death of his two elder brothers. He was the founder of Sibton Abbey, as well as a benefactor of other monasteries in England. In 1157, Chesney acquired the honour of Blythburgh, and was sheriff of Norfolk and Suffolk during the 1150s and 1160s. On Chesney's death in 1174, he left three unmarried daughters as his heirs.

== Early life ==
Chesney was the son of Robert fitz Walter and Sybil de Chesney, and a younger brother of John de Chesney. Sybil was the daughter of Ralph de Chesney. Robert fitz Walter was lord of Horsford in Norfolk, which was originally held by Walter de Caen, Robert's father. The barony was assessed at 10 knight's fees. (Note: A knight's fee was the amount of land that was granted to someone in exchange for a knight's military service of 40 days per year.)

Roger was the eldest brother of William, but died childless during their father's lifetime. The next son, John, inherited the family lands, but died around 1149 without children. William then inherited the lands. John and William had a sister called Margaret, who was the wife of Haimo de St Clair. Their father married a second time, and had a son named Simon by that marriage. William took his surname from his mother's family, as did his half-brother Simon, who was not related to the Chesney family except by marriage. Two further children of Robert's, Elias and Peter, are known, but whether they were the children of the first marriage or the second is unclear. Chesney should be distinguished from another William de Chesney, who controlled the town of Oxford and its castle as well as the town of Deddington and its castle in the same time period. (Note: Sybil was the daughter of Ralph de Chesney, The other William was the son of Roger de Chesney and Alice de Langetot, who were the parents of Ralph de Chesney, who was Sybil's father, making William de Chesney of Oxford the great-uncle of William de Chesney the sheriff of Norfolk and Suffolk.)

== Career ==
Chesney founded Sibton Abbey, and after his brother John's death he confirmed the foundation of that Cistercian monastery, which was the only Cistercian house in Suffolk. Besides founding that monastery, he also gave lands or other gifts to Colne Priory, Essex, Thetford Priory, Castle Acre Priory, St John's Abbey, Stoke-by-Clare Priory, and Blythburgh Priory.

Chesney acquired the barony of Blythburgh in Suffolk in 1157. These lands were recorded in the Domesday Book of 1086 as being held by the king, and when Chesney was granted them they were assessed at one knight's fee in feudal service. Besides Blythburgh, Chesney also acquired lands in Norfolk and Essex which he added to the family lands in Norfolk and Suffolk.

In 1153 or 1154, Chesney was the recipient of the lordship of a hundred and a half in Norfolk, (Note: A hundred was a sub-division of a county.) possibly in compensation for the loss of the manor of Mileham. Chesney likely lost Mileham to another noble family, the fitzAlans, as part of the settlement resulting from the Treaty of Wallingford which settled the civil war in England. Both William's father Robert and his elder brother John had held these offices before him.

Chesney was Sheriff of Norfolk in the late 1140s and the 1150s, being recorded as holding that office in two documents – one dated to between 1146 and 1149 and the other dated to between 1146 and 1153. The same documents record him as holding the office of Sheriff of Suffolk at concurrent times. He held both offices again between 1156 and 1163.

== Death and legacy ==
Chesney died in 1174, having had three daughters with his wife Gilla. Her ancestry is unknown, and it is possible that William married another time, to Aubrey de Poynings, because a Lewes Priory charter dated to around 1165 names a William de Chesney and Aubrey his wife, but it is not clear whether this charter is referring to William de Chesney the sheriff or to another William. William and Gilla's daughters were Margaret, Clemence, and Sara, all of whom were unmarried at the time of their father's death. Margaret married twice – first to Hugh de Cressy and second to Robert fitzRoger. Clemence married Jordan de Sackville, and Sara married Richard Engaine. Margaret inherited the majority of her father's estates.

At his death, Chesney had outstanding debts, both to the king and to Jewish moneylenders. In 1214, his daughter Margaret was exempted from repaying any of her father's debts to those moneylenders by a royal grant.
