= Shelton and Hardwick =

Civil parish in Norfolk, England

Coordinates: 52.46267°N 1.27091°E

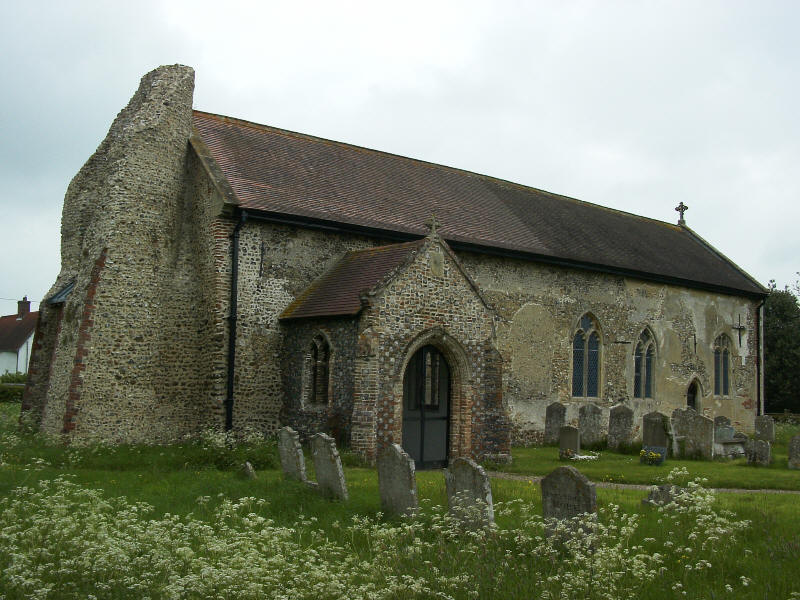
- Hardwick St Margaret

- Location within Norfolk
- Area: 8.90 km^{2} (3.44 sq mi)
- Population: 298 (2011)
  - Density: 33/km^{2} (85/sq mi)
- OS grid reference: TM223900
- Civil parish: Shelton and Hardwick
- District: South Norfolk
- Shire county: Norfolk
- Region: East
- Country: England
- Sovereign state: United Kingdom
- Post town: NORWICH
- Postcode district: NR15
- Dialling code: 01508
- Police: Norfolk
- Fire: Norfolk
- Ambulance: East of England

Shelton and Hardwick is a civil parish in South Norfolk, England, made up of the villages of Shelton and Hardwick. It lies about 3 km south-east of Long Stratton, about 6 km north of Harleston and 10 km west of Bungay. It covers an area of 8.90 km^{2} (3.44 sq mi) and had a population of 283 in 107 households at the 2001 census, increasing the population at the 2011 Census to 298.

Shelton contains a nursery, a church and Shelton Hall.

== Churches ==
Hardwick has a grade I listed church (which is famous locally for its ruined tower and is one of 124 existing round-tower churches in Norfolk), as well as several farms and a substantial amount of housing. It was also home to a Royal Air Force airfield, which was used by the United States Army Air Forces during World War II.

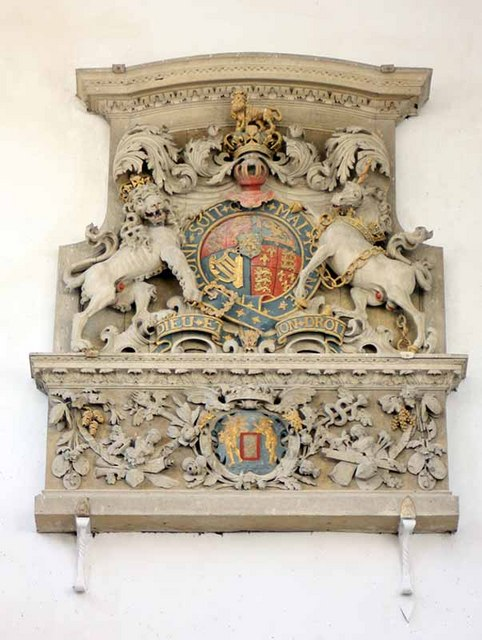
The royal arms in Shelton church

St Mary's Church, Shelton, was built in the 1480s of red brick with dark diapering. Apart from the tower which is earlier than the rest of the church it is in the pure Perpendicular style. The stained class windows include large figures of donors in 15th-century dress. Features of interest include the monument of Sir Robert Houghton, 1623, and the carved royal arms of King William III. There are also tombs of the Shelton family of Shelton Hall. The church is Grade I listed.

== People ==
The Primitive Methodist preacher Elizabeth Bultitude was born into poverty in Hardwick in 1809.

== Notes ==
- Map sources for Shelton and Hardwick
