= Shelton Hall (Norfolk) =

Estate in Shelton, Norfolk, England

Coordinates: 52.4667°N 1.2781°E

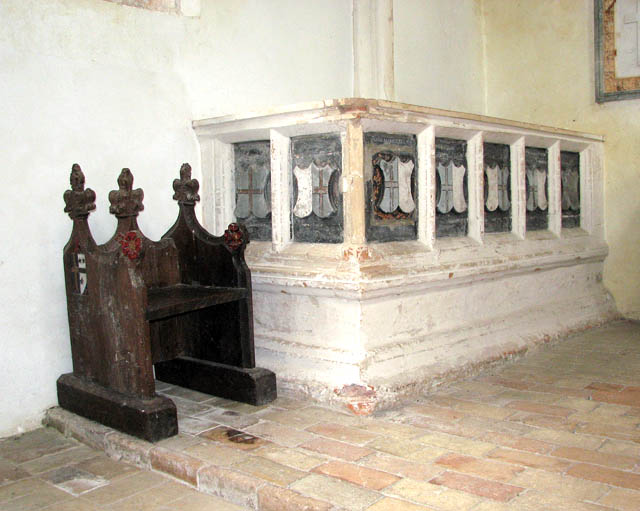
One of the Shelton tombs in St Mary's Church, Shelton

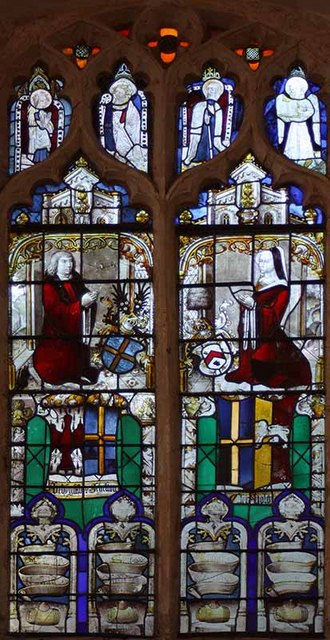
A stained glass window in Shelton church portraying two Shelton benefactors

Shelton Hall is a large estate in the village of Shelton, Norfolk, England. The estate has around 72 acres (290,000 m^{2}) of surrounding fields, the names of the fields include "Magic field" and "Echo field" and has a moat around the house and another smaller one in one of the fields. There are also many trees, shrubs and a bridge.

The house belonged to the Shelton family, family who reached their zenith during the reign of Henry VIII. John De Shelton, the first Lord of the Manor, was born c. 1140. It is said that Nicholas De Shelton was among those barons presenting Magna Carta to King John, while Sir Ralph Shelton was knighted for his services to Edward III at the Battle of Crecy (1346). In the Tudor period Sir John Shelton, the twenty-first Lord of the Manor, and his wife Anne Boleyn were entrusted with the custody of Princess Mary and Princess Elizabeth as children, partly because Anne was the aunt of Queen Anne and the mother of Mary Shelton, the mistress of Henry VIII during his marriage to Anne. A portrait of Mary Shelton by Hans Holbein remains in the Royal Collection at Windsor Castle.

Elizabeth visited her relatives at Shelton and had her own pew in the church of St Mary. After her coronation she summoned her great aunt's family to London, and their descendants including Audrey Shelton would live at court during her reign.

There is a glazed effigy of Sir John Shelton and his wife in the church. A descendant, Captain James Shelton sailed in 1610 to America with Thomas West, Lord De La Warr, his uncle & brother of his mother, Jane West, Baroness Shelton, thus establishing the Sheltons in Virginia. John Smith in his "General Historie of Virginia" (Volume 2, p. 549) writes that James Shelton was a resident of Jamestown, Virginia in 1620 and that he was a member of the court from 1619 to 1624. Smith writes that the Sheltons owned property in Virginia and did a large business with Bermuda. As soon as trade opened between Bermuda and Virginia, James Shelton moved from Virginia to Bermuda where he had large grants of land, and died there in 1668.

The current house, dating from the 17th century, with 18th and 19th century additions, stands within the original moat on the site of the Tudor mansion of the Sheltons, which was destroyed by fire. Evidence of the moat of a former settlement remains in the "Dark Park" to the south-east of the current hall.
