= John Heveningham (MP for Suffolk) =

Sir John Heveningham (c. 1359-1425), of Heveningham, Suffolk, was an English Member of Parliament (MP).

He was a Member of the Parliament of England for Suffolk in 1399.
