= John Ingoldisthorpe =

Sir John Ingoldisthorpe (c.1361-1420), of Ingoldisthorpe and Raynham, Norfolk, was an English Member of Parliament (MP).

He was a Member of the Parliament of England for Suffolk in January 1404 and for Norfolk in November 1414. He was the Sheriff of Norfolk and Suffolk 29 November 1402 – 5 November 1403.
