= Madge Shelton =

English courtier (??–c.1555)

Margaret Shelton (likely died before 1555) was the sister of Mary Shelton, and was once thought to be a mistress of Henry VIII of England.

== Family ==
Both Margaret and Mary were daughters of Sir John Shelton and his wife Anne, the sister of Thomas Boleyn, 1st Earl of Wiltshire, the father of King Henry VIII's second Queen consort, Anne Boleyn. Margaret and Mary were thus first cousins of the Queen. Margaret was the youngest of Sir John Shelton's daughters. She was an attendant of her cousin, Queen Anne Boleyn, and was present when she made her first appearance as queen on Easter Eve, 12 April 1533.

== King's mistress ==
One of the Shelton sisters is believed to have been King Henry's mistress for a six-month period beginning in February 1535, according to statements about mistresses made by the Imperial ambassador, Eustace Chapuys, who referred to Mistress Shelton.

According to biographer Antonia Fraser, this was Margaret Shelton. Chapuys was always at court when in England, more frequently so than most contemporaneous writers. Hugh Latimer identified Madge Shelton as the woman attendant on Anne when she miscarried within hours of Katherine of Aragon's death. Madge was the "concubine's" closest companion in waiting owing to her familial ties, yet would be dismissed at the end.

However, more recent research has suggested that it was Margaret's sister Mary who was Henry's mistress, and was rumoured to have been selected to become his fourth wife. Supposedly, the confusion of earlier historians arose from the label "Marg Shelton", in which the "y" resembled a "g", a common confusion in sixteenth-century writing.

== Other relationships ==
Once arrested, Anne Boleyn was attended by four unsympathetic ladies, who had been instructed by the King's chief minister Thomas Cromwell to report on the Queen's actions. Anne told one of these ladies, Mrs Coffin, that she had reprimanded Francis Weston for flirting with Madge Shelton, who was betrothed to Henry Norris. Anne wondered aloud to Weston why Norris had not married Shelton yet. Weston replied, "[Norris] came more to her [Anne's] chamber for her than for Madge." Both Norris, Madge Shelton's betrothed, and her supposed lover Weston, were executed on charge of having been Anne Boleyn's lovers.

== Marriage and later life ==
Madge married Thomas Woodhouse, the son of Sir Roger Woodhouse or Wodehouse (d. 1560), and his wife Elizabeth Radcliffe, daughter of Sir Robert Radcliffe of Hunstanton. Madge's husband was present at the battle of Pinkie in September 1547, some sources suggest he was killed there. They had had Roger Woodhouse (c. 1541 – 1588), father of Sir Philip Wodehouse, 1st Baronet and ancestor of the later Earls of Kimberley.

== In fiction ==
Margaret Shelton is the narrator in Jean Bruller (Vercors)' 1985 book Anne Boleyn (originally written in French), in which Anne Boleyn is presented as a far-sighted English patriot, who strove to make England strong and independent by ending its dependence on the Catholic Church and building up its navy. As depicted in the book, Margaret Shelton was Anne Boleyn's closest and most loyal companion throughout her life, shared her vision for England, and lived to impart it to her daughter, the future Queen Elizabeth I.

Madge Shelton appears in The Tudors, portrayed by Laura Jane Laughlin. She is put forward by Anne herself (though it upsets her), in an attempt to control who Henry beds. It fails.

== See also ==
- List of English royal mistresses

== Bibliography ==
- Richardson, Douglas (2004). Plantagenet Ancestry: A Study in Colonial and Medieval Families, ed. Kimball G. Everingham. Baltimore, Maryland: Genealogical Publishing Company Inc. ISBN 9780806317502.
- Weir, Alison (1991). The Six Wives of Henry VIII. New York: Grove Weidenfeld.
- Weir, Alison (2001). Henry VIII: King and Court. London: Random House. ISBN 0-224-06022-8.
- Weir, Alison (2009). The Lady in the Tower: The Fall of Anne Boleyn. London: Random House. ISBN 978-0-224-06319-7.
- Herman, Peter C., ed. (1994). Rethinking the Henrician Era: Essays on Early Tudor Texts and Contexts. University of Illinois Press. pp. 40–77.
- Hart, Kelly (2009). The Mistresses of Henry VIII. Stroud, Gloucestershire: The History Press. pp. 120–128. ISBN 978-0-7524-4835-0.
- Ives, Eric (2005). The Life and Death of Anne Boleyn: 'The Most Happy'. Oxford: Blackwell. ISBN 978-0-631-23479-1.
