= Rushbrooke, West Suffolk =

Village in Suffolk, England

Coordinates: 52.220907°N 0.760878°E

Rushbrooke
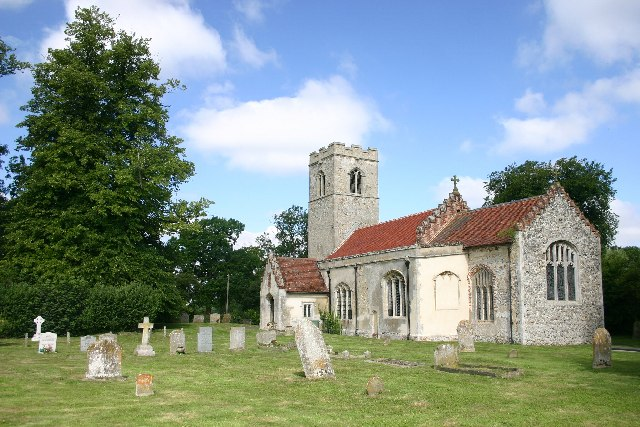

- Location within Suffolk
- OS grid reference: TL887617
- Civil parish: Rushbrooke with Rougham
- District: West Suffolk
- Shire county: Suffolk
- Region: East
- Country: England
- Sovereign state: United Kingdom
- Post town: BURY ST. EDMUNDS
- Postcode district: IP30
- Dialling code: 01284
- Police: Suffolk
- Fire: Suffolk
- Ambulance: East of England

Rushbrooke is a village and former civil parish on the River Lark, 20 miles (32 km) north west of Ipswich, now in the parish of Rushbrooke with Rougham, in the West Suffolk district, in the county of Suffolk, England. Until April 2019 Rushbrooke was in the St Edmundsbury district. In 1961 the parish had a population of 58.

== Features ==
Rushbrooke has a church dedicated to St Nicholas.

== History ==
The name "Rushbrooke" means "Rush brook". Rushbrooke was recorded in the Domesday Book of 1086 as Rycebroc. Alternative names for Rushbrooke are "Rushbroke" and "Rushbrook". The surname Rushbrook derives from Rushbrooke. In 1912 R.B.W. Rushbrooke was the sole owner of Rushbrooke. On 1 April 1988 the parish was abolished and Rushbrooke with Rougham was created.

== See also ==
- Rushbrooke Hall
