= Rushbrooke Hall =

British stately home in Suffolk

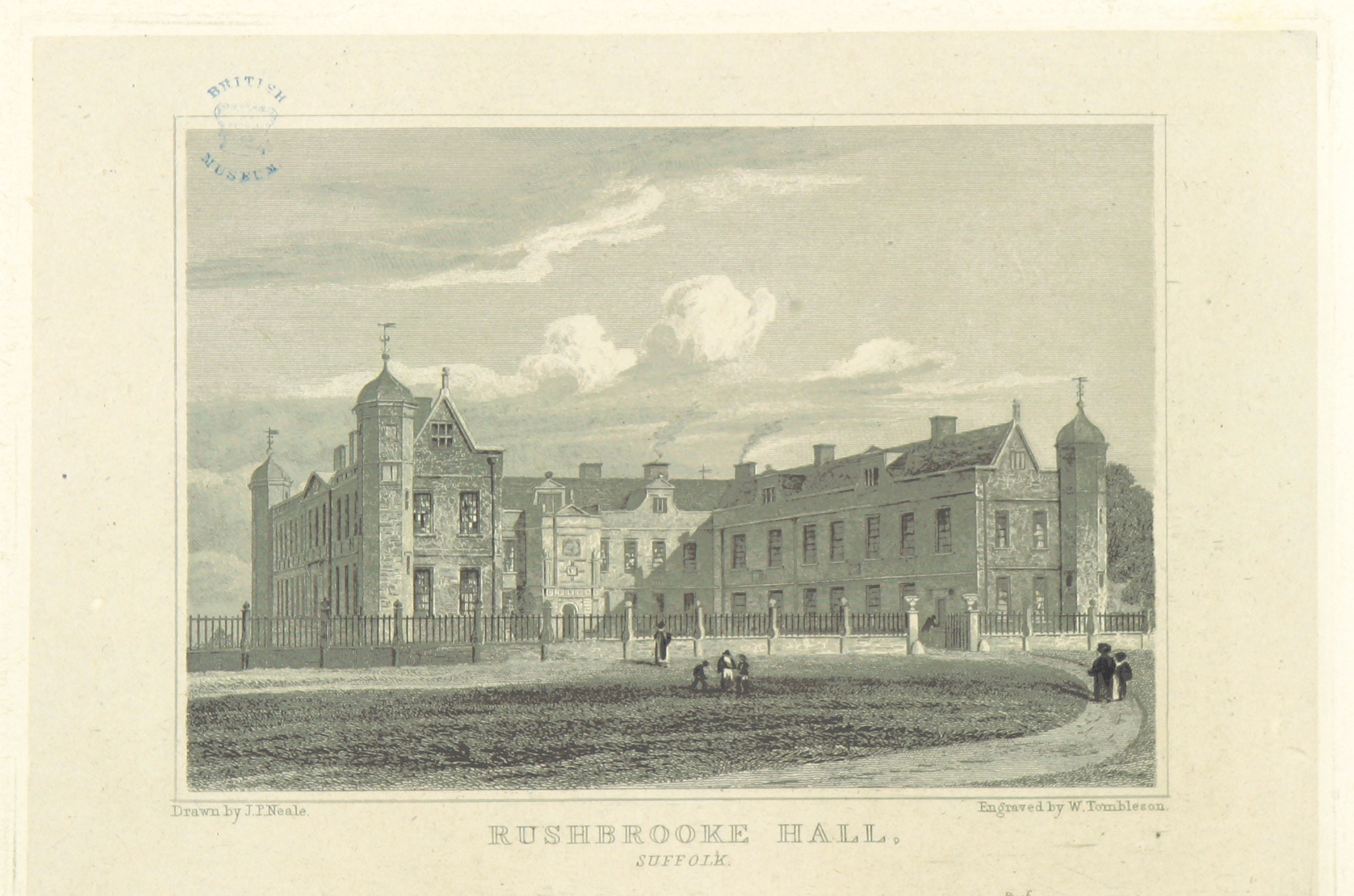
- Rushbrooke Hall drawn in 1818.

- Location within Suffolk

General information
- Architectural style: Tudor architecture
- Location: England, Rushbrooke, West Suffolk
- Coordinates: 52°12′57.96″N 0°45′58.68″E
- Demolished: mid-16th century; 1961

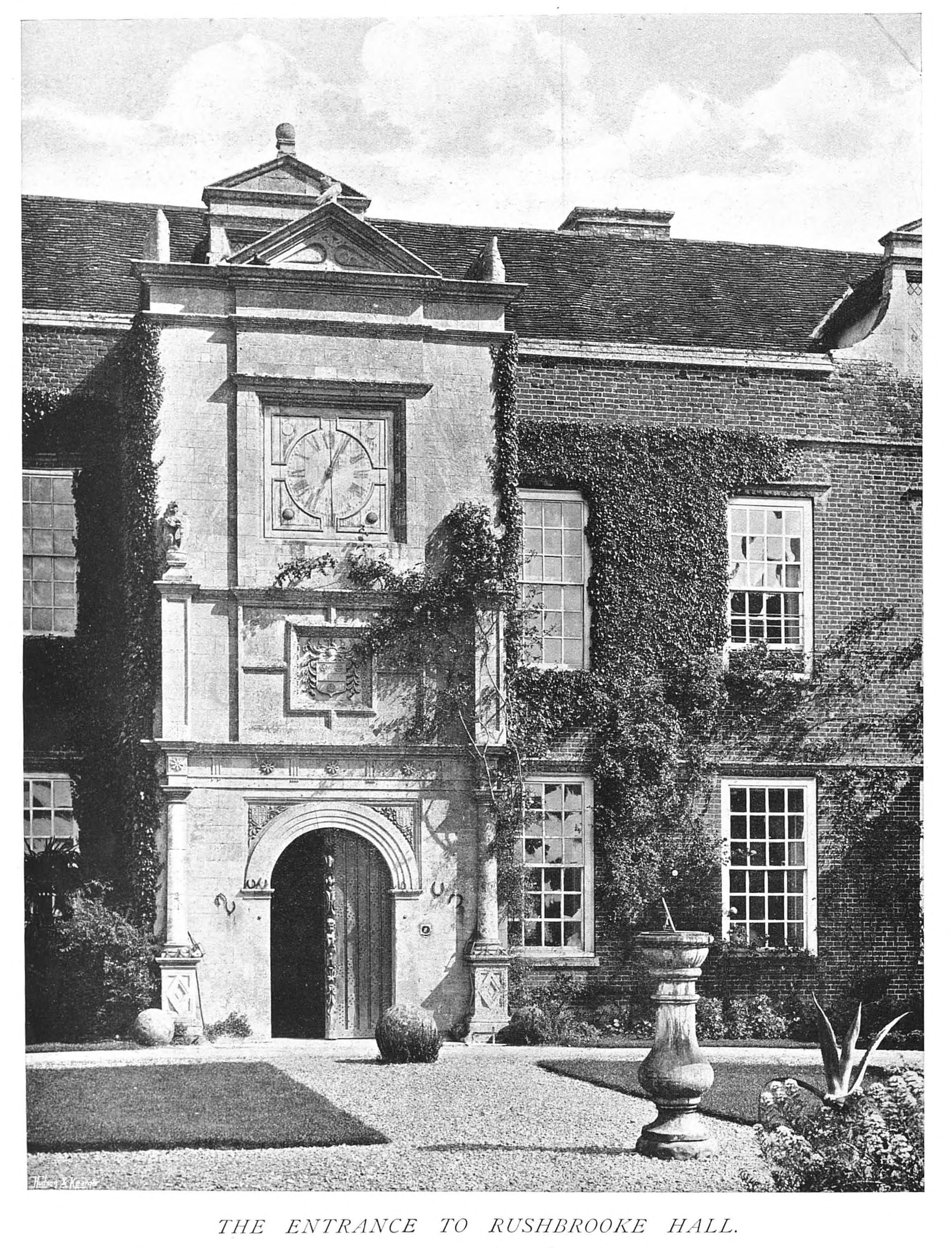
Entrance to Rushbrooke Hall, photograph published in 1904

Rushbrooke Hall was a British stately home in Rushbrooke, Suffolk. For several hundred years it was the family seat of the Jermyn family and later of their relations, the Davers baronets. It was destroyed by a fire during its demolition in 1961.

== History ==
The original manor house on the moated site to the south of the village of Rushbrooke is believed to have been constructed in the reign of King John on land owned by Bury St Edmunds Abbey. Originally named after the local landowning Rushbrooke family, who were tenants of the estate from 1180, between 1230 and 1703 the manor and estate was held by the Jermyn family. The older manor was largely demolished and remodeled in the mid-16th century by Sir Thomas Jermyn, to be replaced by a red brick, two storey building in the Tudor style.

The new stately home was completed in about 1550, and was laid out in an E-shaped plan. It was constructed around a courtyard, about 30m square with the main range of the house running along the north side of the moat and two long projecting wings along the east and west sides. There were polygonal turrets, each three stories high, at the four corners of the wings. The entrance to the house was through an impressive central porch built of Barnack stone and decorated with armorial achievements. The moated stately home was at the centre of a large ornamental garden and a parkland estate. An ornamental canal, 114 metres long, has since been infilled. The Jermyn family exercised considerable influence in Suffolk and Elizabeth I is recorded as having stayed at the house in 1578 and on at least one other occasion.

As the principle seat of the Jermyns, after Sir Thomas the house passed through the ownership of his descendants Ambrose Jermyn, Sir Robert Jermyn, Thomas Jermyn (died 1645) and Thomas Jermyn (died 1659) until being inherited by his son, Thomas Jermyn. Thomas' uncle, Henry Jermyn, 1st Earl of St Albans, took up residence in 1674, but on his death in 1684, the house reverted to Thomas. He died without male heirs in 1703, and the estate was divided among his four surviving daughters. Through his marriage to Hon. Mary Jermyn, Sir Robert Davers, 2nd Baronet purchased the other shares of the house and estate from his wife's sisters (Lady Spring, Lady D'Ewes and Mrs Grove) in 1703. Major modernising alterations were made to the house in about 1735. These included a new north front and the impressive interiors with rococo stuccowork and fireplaces, decorated with carvings by Grinling Gibbons. The Davers family held the house until the death of Sir Charles Davers, 6th Baronet in 1806. It passed to Frederick Hervey, 1st Marquess of Bristol, who sold the house to Robert Rushbrooke, whose family owned the house until 1919. At this point, the house and 195 acres were bought by Captain Philip Ashworth, which much of the contents being auctioned. In 1922, the house was bought by John Dickson-Poynder, 1st Baron Islington, who owned it until his death in 1936.

In 1938 ownership of the manor was taken over by the Rothschild family. In 1941, it became a convalescent home for the wounded, and in 1947, it became a hostel for a farming institute. In 1961 it was decided to demolish the house; shortly afterwards a fire devastated the building. Several of the remaining decorative features were used in St Edmund's Church, Bury St Edmunds. The moated site and some of the formal gardens are all that remain of the house.
