= Mary Shelton =

English poet & courtier (1510/15–1570/71)

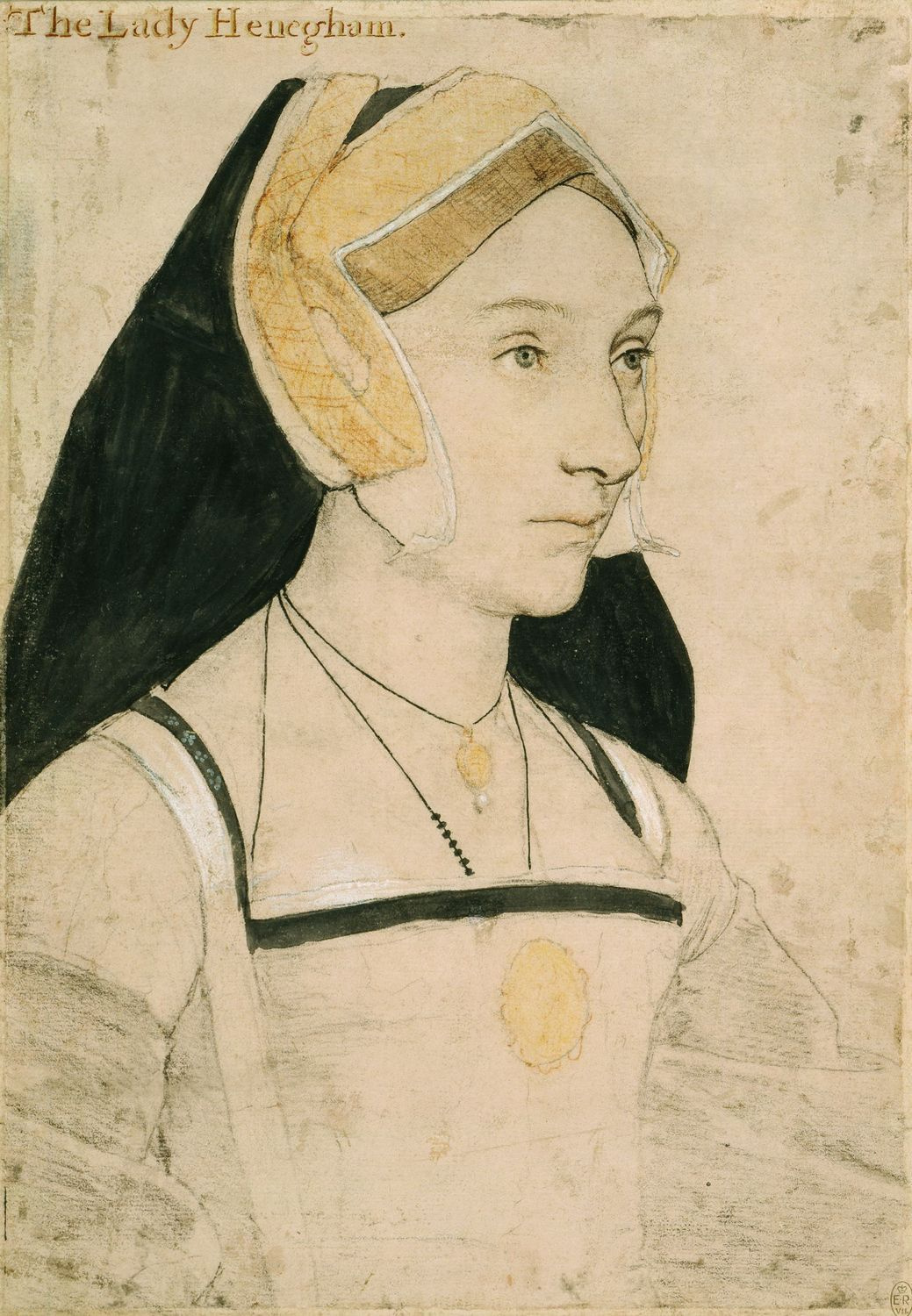
Drawing of Mary, Lady Heveningham, by Hans Holbein the Younger

Mary Shelton (1510/15 – 1570/71) was an English courtier. As a poet, she was one of the contributors to the Devonshire manuscript. Either she or her sister Madge Shelton may have been a mistress of King Henry VIII.

== Family ==
Both Margaret and Mary were daughters of Sir John Shelton and his wife Anne, the sister of Thomas Boleyn, 1st Earl of Wiltshire. Thomas Boleyn was the father of Anne Boleyn, second Queen consort to Henry VIII of England. Margaret and Mary were thus first cousins of the Queen. Princess Mary sent her New Year's Day gifts of a sum of money, 7 shillings 6 pence, in January 1537 and 1540.

Mary joined the court some time in 1534. She wrote poems, and according to William Latymer she was chided by Anne Boleyn for writing "certeyne ydill poeses" in a prayerbook, which she had given to the Queen. She was part of a social group which included the poets Sir Thomas Clere (d. 14 April 1545), Henry Howard, Earl of Surrey, and Thomas Wyatt, with all of whom she was romantically linked. In an epitaph he composed at the death of Sir Thomas Clere, Surrey identified Mary as Clere's "beloved". Mary's two closest friends were Lady Margaret Douglas, a niece of King Henry VIII, and Mary Howard, Duchess of Richmond, wife of the King's illegitimate son, Henry Fitzroy, Duke of Richmond. Shelton was the main editor and a contributor to the famous Devonshire MS, where members of their circle wrote poems they enjoyed or had composed.

Her father, John Shelton (1472 – 21 December 1539), was the son of Sir Ralph Shelton and Margaret Clere. He was a high sheriff in 1504, and knighted in 1509. Her siblings were John, Ralph, Elizabeth, Anne, Gabriella, Emma, Thomas, Margaret and Amy Shelton (Mary was one of 10 children). She was married three times and had seven children. After the death of her fiancé, Thomas Clere, she married Anthony Heveningham of Ketteringham, her first cousin. She had seven children with Heveningham: Arthur, John, Abigail, Bridget, Elizabeth, Mary and Anne. Another son, Anthony, died on 22 November 1557. Mary's final marriage was to Phillip Appleyard.

== King's mistress ==
One of the Shelton sisters is believed to have been King Henry's mistress for a six-month period beginning in February 1535, according to statements about mistresses made by the Imperial ambassador, Eustace Chapuys, who referred to a "Mistress Shelton". According to Antonia Fraser, this was Margaret Shelton. Hugh Latimer identified Madge Shelton as the woman attendant on Anne when she miscarried within hours of Queen Katherine of Aragon's death. Madge was the "concubine's" closest companion in waiting owing to her familial ties, yet would be dismissed at the end.

However, more recent research has suggested that it was Margaret's sister Mary who was Henry's mistress, and was rumoured to have been selected to become his fourth wife. Supposedly, the confusion of earlier historians arose from the label "Marg Shelton", in which the "y" resembled a "g", a common confusion in sixteenth-century writing.

Mary would have been a 'lady-in-waiting' to Anne, and although the two were cousins, according to Hart, "...this did not mean that their families were allies—not all Boleyns supported the queen..." In point of fact, Queen Anne has been said to have been deeply in love with Henry and also very jealous of his attention to other women. Mary, known for having contributed greatly to the Devonshire MS, wrote many poems about love. Queen Anne was especially jealous that Mary could have been writing love poems about her husband, the King. To make matters worse, Mary has been described as a young girl of great beauty and talent, and her friends at court were a great influence on her, most of them also being highly literate. According to one historian "Rumour twice linked Mary amorously with Henry VIII". The other rumour, that 'Madge' Shelton might become Henry's wife in 1538, appears in one of the Lisle Letters. Uncertainty over the date of Mary's birth means she could have been as young as fifteen when she began her affair with King Henry VIII. Their affair together was short-lived, only lasting about six months. Mary seemed to have been very accepting of the situation with the king, and did not press him to give her land, money, or a title.

In 1536 Mary's sister, Madge, was betrothed to Henry Norris, a high-flying courtier, and strong supporter of the Boleyns' reformist cause. Norris was in "very great favour with the King," but he was about to be accused of treason because the Queen misinterpreted his feelings, which coloured the testimonies they were both later forced to give. Madge seems to be a faithful servant, yet fearfully duped by her mother Lady Shelton's spying, determined as she was to bring down Norris and Weston for using her daughter. Unfortunately Mistress Coffin had already been groomed as a spy when the Queen inadvertently told her of Sir Francis Weston's flirtations with Madge, of which she reproved. Norris may have been her betrothed, but Weston naively insinuated that he was in the Queen's Chambers to see her and not her servant. Norris was executed for treason on 17 May 1536. Madge's father died at the age of sixty-two and left his family with financial troubles; disconsolate, Madge went away to a convent.

Mary became engaged to Thomas Clere (son of Alice Boleyn, Lady Clere) the poet and her first cousin through their mothers; however, he died soon after their engagement, leaving Mary his lands in his will.

By 1546 Mary had married her cousin Sir Anthony Heveningham (1507–1557) by whom she had five children, including Arthur Heveningham, and her youngest daughter, Abigail (wife of Sir George Digby of Coleshill, Warwickshire), who was later in attendance on Queen Elizabeth in 1588. Meanwhile, there was suspicion of a conspiracy between Mary and Surrey, which was noted for investigation by the Privy Council. Mary later married Philip Appleyard (b. c.1528), the half-brother of Amy Robsart, in 1558. She was buried in Heveningham Church, Suffolk, on 8 January 1571. A probable portrait of Mary by Hans Holbein is in the collection at Windsor Castle.

== Involvement in the Devonshire Manuscript ==
=== Circulation and Mary's Possession of the MS ===
The Devonshire manuscript passed through many hands during its circulation in the 1520s and 1530s. A few months after the confinement of Margaret Douglas and Thomas Howard for an impolitic affair in 1536, the MS was passed to Mary Shelton for the first time, where it is likely she added poems and allowed others to add poems to folios 22–50. The MS returned to Mary Shelton (and Mary Fitzroy) in 1539, with the return of Mary Fitzroy to the Court. During this time, at Kenninghall, Mary Shelton is believed to have largely completed the manuscript with the addition of many Medieval fragments in folios 88–92.

=== Authorship Ambiguity ===
Of the roughly 184 poems included in the collection, 80 have not been attributed to a definitive author. The majority of poems are ascribed to Thomas Wyatt. Others are attributed to Chaucer and other Medieval poets, and still others are assumed to have been created by Mary Shelton's contemporaries, including Edmund Knyvet, Thomas Howard, and Henry Stuart, along with some ambiguous notations of "A.I". and "Jon K". as well as "Ann", which may refer to Anne Boleyn. Although Harrier (1975) discounted that 'an' had anything to do with Anne Boleyn and denied it was evidence of any signature. Yet that author also assumes "a face should content me" were lines addressed to Madge's friend Mary Howard, another beauty, married to Wyatt's friend the royal Duke of Richmond. Although there is much debate and ambiguity surrounding the manuscript, Shelton is argued by scholars to be the main contributor and editor of the document. Margaret Douglas is sometimes also credited with this.

=== The 'Courtly Love Lyric' ===
==== Women and the Court ====
Mary Shelton, as a part of the Court of Anne Boleyn, was subject to a culture of fine lines of social acceptability. Tudor culture expected a level of both amorous and self-restrained behaviour from women. As Ann Jones assesses, a woman was encouraged "to be a member of the chorus prompting men to bravery in tournaments and eloquence in conversation; she was expected to be a witty and informed participant in dialogues whose subject was most often love.

The poetry of the time reflected this. In Tudor Court, poems, like the ones ascribed in the Devonshire MS, were an integral part of social interaction, exchanged between members perhaps for songs, perhaps for rumor and the innuendo of gossip.

==== 'Ydill Poesies' ====
Along with the poetry she 'lifted' from medieval poets, Mary is thought to have added few original poems to the Manuscript. What is thought to be Mary Shelton’s handwriting has been identified in the following folios of the manuscript: 3, 22, 26–29, 30, 40–44, 55, 58–60, 61–62, 65, 67–68, 88, 89–90, 91–92. An "unsentimental, plain-speaking" tone is often associated with her contributions.

Folios 6 and 7 of the document include the poem 'Suffryng in sorow in hope to attayn,' a poem about a despondent lover who cannot figure out her lover's pain. Above the poem in the folios, Margaret Douglas expresses her disappointment with it, saying 'forget thys,' but Mary Shelton, in her handwriting below Douglas', asserts the poem's worthiness: 'yt ys worhy.' This poem is usually ascribed to Mary Shelton because the first letters of the first seven stanzas spell out "SHELTVN"

There are a number of poems in the collection that are written from a woman's point of view, but it is unclear if the author is Shelton, or if, for that matter, the author is a woman at all. (Note: Mary Shelton is one of the main subjects of The Mistresses of Henry VIII by Kelly Hart, and Rethinking the Henrician Era: Essays on Early Tudor Texts and Contexts by Paul G. Remley. She is also a subject of a triple biography entitled The Forgotten Tudor Women: Margaret Douglas, Mary Howard & Mary Shelton by Sylvia Barbara Soberton.)

== Fictional portrayals ==
- She appears in The Lady in the Tower by Jean Plaidy.
- The character of Madge Sheldon, played by Laura Jane Laughlin in the Showtime series The Tudors is loosely inspired by the two sisters.
- Mary Shelton appears in the series of books "The Lady Grace Mysteries" as a maid of honour to Queen Elizabeth I.
- She is the main character in "At the Mercy of the Queen" by Anne Clinard Barnhill.
- Mary Shelton is the first person narrator of Queenbreaker, a Young Adult novel, by Catherine McCarran.
- Mary Shelton appears in the Wolf Hall trilogy, combining elements of both her and her sister's biographies.

== See also ==
- List of English royal mistresses
- Henry VIII
- Anne Boleyn

== Notes ==
=== Bibliography ===
- Bindoff, S.T. (1982). The House of Commons 1509–1558. Vol. III. London: Secker & Warburg.
- Block, Joseph S. (2006). Shelton family (per. 1504–1558), gentry. Oxford Dictionary of National Biography.
- Heale, Elizabeth (2004). Shelton, Mary (married names Mary Heveningham, Lady Heveningham; Mary Appleyard) (1510x15–1570/71), contributor to manuscript miscellany. Oxford Dictionary of National Biography.
- Ives, E.W. (2004). Anne (Anne Boleyn) (c.1500–1536), queen of England, second consort of Henry VIII. Oxford Dictionary of National Biography.
- Richardson, Douglas (2004). Plantagenet Ancestry: A Study in Colonial and Medieval Families, ed. Kimball G. Everingham. Baltimore, Maryland: Genealogical Publishing Company Inc. ISBN 9780806317502.
- Weir, Alison (1991). The Six Wives of Henry VIII. New York: Grove Weidenfeld.
- Weir, Alison (2001). Henry VIII: King and Court. London. ISBN 0-224-06022-8.
- Weir, Alison (2009). The Lady in the Tower: The Fall of Anne Boleyn. London. ISBN 978-0-224-06319-7.
- Soberton, Sylvia Barbara (2015). The Forgotten Tudor Women: Margaret Douglas, Mary Howard & Mary Shelton. Charleston: CreateSpace Independent Publishing Platform.

=== Secondary sources ===
- Southall, Raymond (1964). "The Devonshire manuscript collection of early Tudor poetry, 1532–41". The Review of English Studies. 15 (58): 142–150. doi:10.1093/res/XV.58.142. ISSN 0034-6551.
- Remley, Paul G. (1994). "Mary Shelton & her Literary Milieu," in, Rethinking the Henrician Era. University of Illinois. ISBN 9780252063404.
- Herman, Peter C., ed. (1994). Rethinking the Henrician Era: Essays on Early Tudor Texts and Contexts. University of Illinois Press. pp. 40–77. ISBN 9780252063404.
- Harrier, Richard C. (1975). Canon of Sir Thomas Wyatt's Poetry. Cambridge, Mass.
- Hart, Kelly (2009). The Mistresses of Henry VIII. Stroud, Gloucestershire: The History Press. pp. 120–128. ISBN 978-0-7524-4835-0.

=== Manuscripts ===
- Calendar of State Papers, Spanish
- Letters and Papers of the Reign of Henry VIII
- Correspondance Politique ed MM. Castillon et de Marillac, ambassadeurs de France en Angleterre, 1537-42 (ed. Jean Kaulek, Paris, 1885)

=== Fiction references ===
- Gregory, Philippa (2001). The Other Boleyn Girl. London: Three River's Press.
