= Bamber Gascoyne =

Bamber Gascoyne may refer to:

- Bamber Gascoyne (the elder) (1725–1791), British MP for Maldon, Bossiney, Midhurst, Weobley and Truro
- Bamber Gascoyne (the younger) (1758–1824), British MP for Liverpool

== See also ==
- Bamber Gascoigne (1935–2022), British television presenter and author
