= George Boscawen =

George Boscawen may refer to:

- George Boscawen (British Army general) (1712–1775), MP for Penryn and Truro
- George Boscawen (MP for St Mawes) (1745–?), his son, MP for St Mawes and Truro
- George Boscawen, 3rd Viscount Falmouth (1758–1808), British Army officer and statesman
- George Boscawen, 2nd Earl of Falmouth (1811–1852), British politician
- George Boscawen, 9th Viscount Falmouth (1919–2022), British Army officer
