= Luton Hoo =

English country house and estate

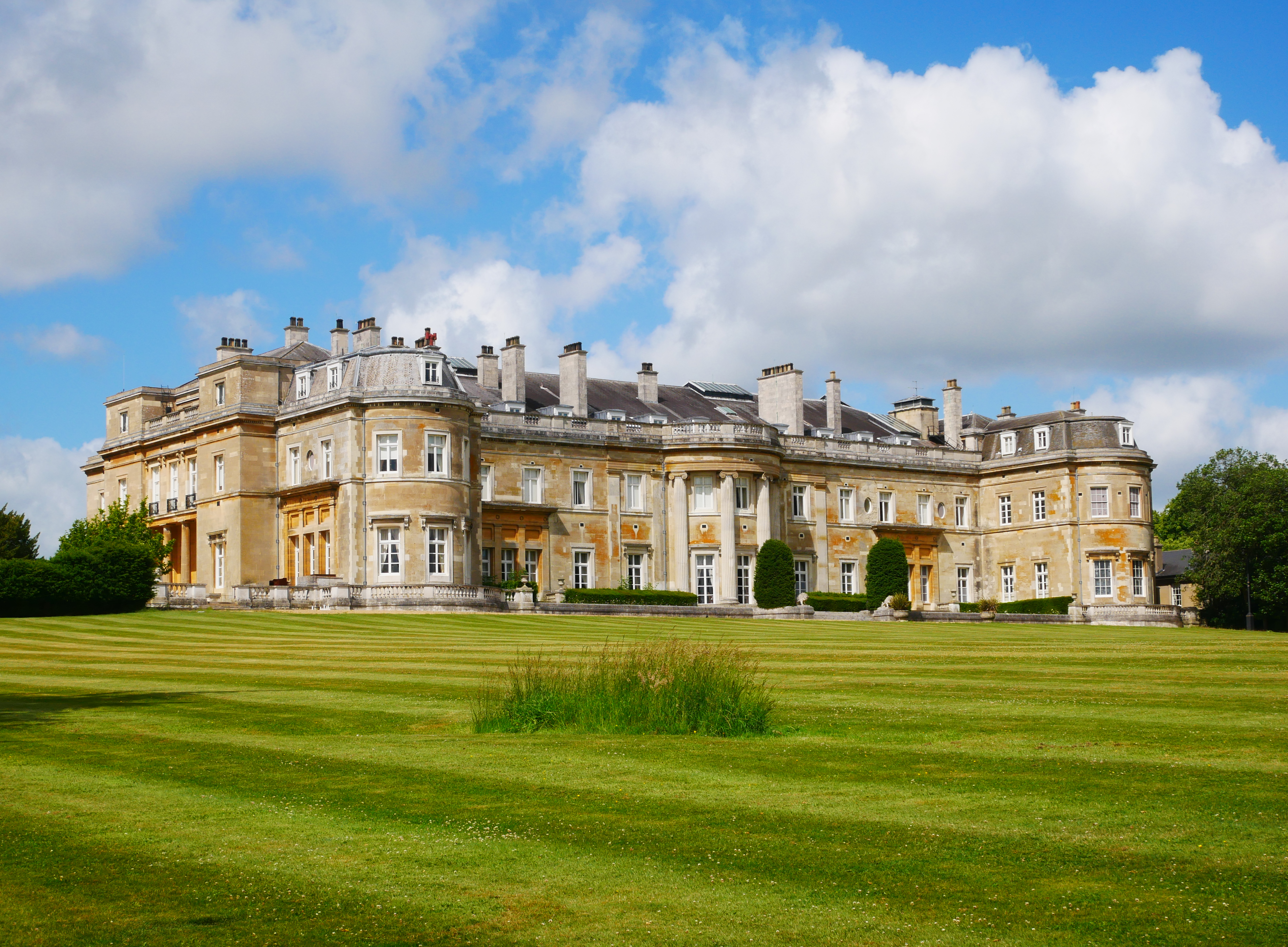

- Location within Bedfordshire
- 51°51′16.6″N 0°23′51.4″W
- Location: Hyde, Bedfordshire
- OS grid reference: TL1045118552

History
- Built for: John Stuart, 3rd Earl of Bute

Site notes
- Architect: Robert Adam
- Architectural style: Neoclassical
- Restored: 1830
- Restored by: Robert Smirke

Listed Building – Grade I

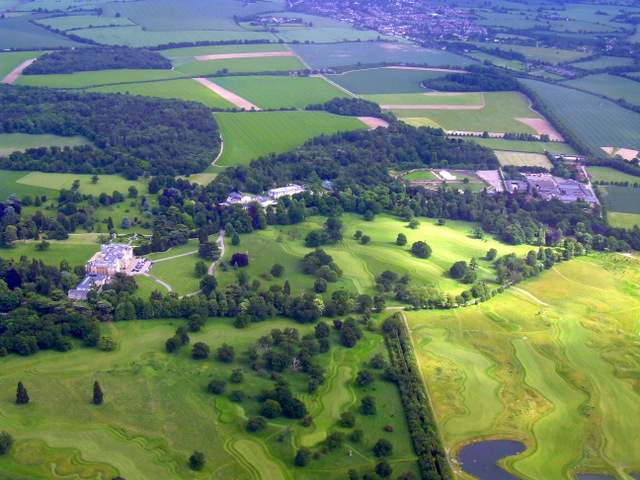
Luton Hoo from the air

Luton Hoo is an English country house and estate near Luton in Bedfordshire and Harpenden in Hertfordshire. Most of the estate lies within the civil parish of Hyde, Bedfordshire. The Saxon word Hoo means the spur of a hill, and is more commonly associated with East Anglia.

An original manor house on the site belonged to the de Hoo family until the 1450s, when inherited by the heiress Anne Hoo, wife of Geoffrey Boleyn. The manor remained a property of the Boleyn family until Anne's grandson Thomas Boleyn, 1st Earl of Wiltshire sold it to a wealthy merchant. The manor changed owners several times until it was inherited by the politician Francis Herne in the early 1750s. A decade later, Herne sold the manor to the prime minister of Great Britain John Stuart, 3rd Earl of Bute. Bute financed the construction of the present house from 1767 to 1774. His grandson John Crichton-Stuart, 2nd Marquess of Bute financed a redesign of the house in the early 1830s, which added a massive portico to Luton Hoo.

== History ==
=== Pre-1762 ===
The manor of Luton Hoo is not mentioned in the Domesday Book, but a family called de Hoo occupied a manor house on the site for four centuries, until the death of Thomas Hoo, 1st Baron Hoo and Hastings in 1455. The manor passed into the marital family of his daughter, Anne, married to Geoffrey Boleyn, great-grandfather of Anne Boleyn, Queen of England. Anne's father, Thomas Boleyn, eventually sold the property to Richard Fermour, a wealthy London Merchant. It then passed to the Rotherham family and then the Napier family. Successive houses were built on the site. In 1751, Francis Herne, a member of parliament MP for Bedford, inherited the house from his kinswoman Miss Napier.

=== Crichton-Stuart ===
In 1763, Francis Herne sold the estate for £94,700 to the 3rd Earl of Bute. Following an unhappy period as Prime Minister from 1762 to 1763, Lord Bute decided to concentrate his energies on his estate at Luton Hoo.

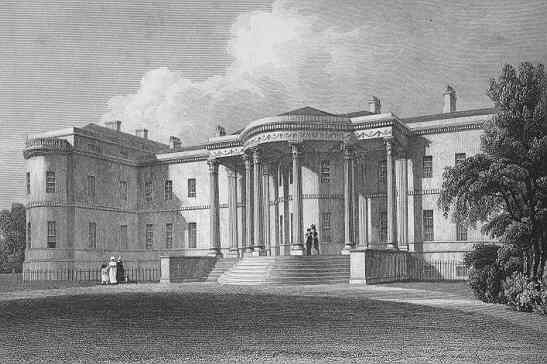
1829 engraving of Luton Hoo, as designed by Robert Adam. Two major sets of alterations were made after the image was published.

The present house was built by the 3rd Earl of Bute to the designs of the neoclassical architect Robert Adam. Work commenced in 1767. The original plan had been for a grand and magnificent new house, but the plan was never fully executed and much of the work was a remodelling of the older house. Building work was interrupted by a fire in 1771 but by 1774 the house, though incomplete, was inhabited. Dr. Samuel Johnson, who visited the house in 1781, remarked: "This is one of the places I do not regret coming to see... in the house magnificence is not sacrificed to convenience, nor convenience to magnificence".

Luton Hoo was one of the largest houses for which Adam was wholly responsible. While Adam was working on the mansion, the landscape gardener Capability Brown was enlarging and redesigning the park, which was enlarged from about 300 acres (1.2 km^{2}) to 1,200 acres (4.9 km^{2}). Brown dammed the River Lea to form two lakes, one of which is 60 acres (0.24 km^{2}) in size. In the early 20th century, part of the park overlooked by the south-west facade of the house was transformed into formal gardens.

In about 1830, the 2nd Marquess of Bute, grandson of the 3rd Earl, transformed the house, to the designs of the architect Robert Smirke (later Sir Robert, 1781–1867), a leading architect of the era. Smirke redesigned the house (with the exception of the south front) to resemble its present form today, complete with a massive portico, similar to that designed by Adam but never built. His early work and domestic designs, such as that at Eastnor Castle, were often in a medieval style; he seems to have reserved his Greek Revival style for public buildings such as the British Museum. Luton Hoo, neither Gothic nor strictly Greek Revival, is an unusual example of him using a classical style for domestic use, which perhaps he felt would be sympathetic to Adam's original conception.

Another addition was the neo-Gothic lodge with Tudor-style windows, and a Norman-style door, imported from an older building. Known as 'Lady Bute's Lodge' it is a Grade II listed building.

In 1843, a devastating fire destroyed much of the house and its contents. The house remained a burnt-out shell until after 1848, when the estate was sold to John Shaw Leigh.

=== LandRover Experience ===
In addition to the history and wild spanning greenlands and mass of wildlife and rare wildflowers such as the Venus flytraps and Japanese man eating Lillie's, the site hosts the London LandRover centre. The site has a mix of both natural and man made tracks. Located on the Jurassic natural slopes of the technical area, UK manufacturing can be seen negotiating the slopes of an extinct volcano, a set of dinosaur bones which form a rock face and what was once an Olympic training ski slope which now forms the start of pilots view the steepest landrover track in Europe. Landrover Luton also has the country's most skilled instructors, one of whom starred as the stunt driver in the Italian Job, Mr. Beans Holiday and most recently the opening ceremony driving section of the Circus at Blackpool pleasure beach.

=== Leigh ===
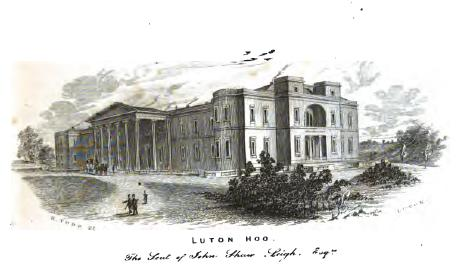
1855 engraving entitled Luton Hoo, the seat of John Shaw Leigh, Esq^{re.}

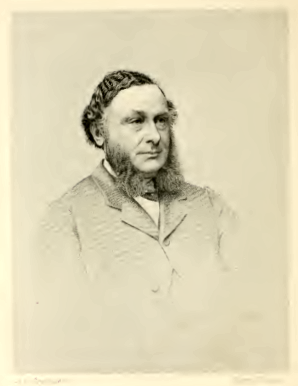
1872 portrait of John Gerard Leigh (1821–1875) of Luton Hoo

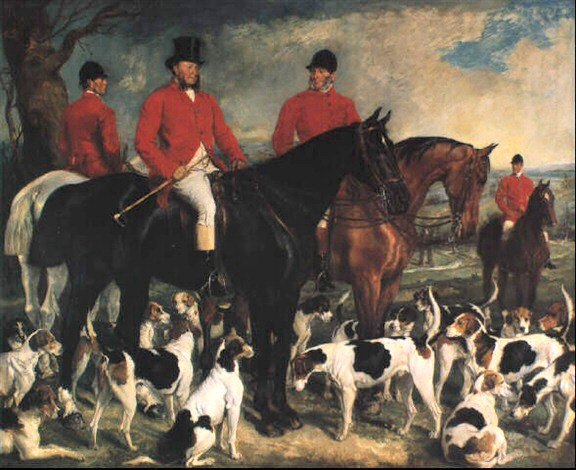
John Gerard Leigh (1821–1875), of Luton Hoo, Master of the Hertfordshire Foxhounds

In 1848, the estate with the burnt-out house was purchased by John Shaw Leigh (d.1871), a Liverpool solicitor and property speculator, Mayor of Liverpool in 1841, whose family originated in Lipton, in Lancashire. He married Hannah Blundell-Hollinshead, a daughter of Henry Blundell (1755–1832), Mayor of Liverpool in 1791–1794 and in 1807, owner of Orrell, Blackrod and Pemberton collieries near Liverpool. His father, John Leigh, senior, was a solicitor and land agent to the Earl of Derby, the major landowner in the Liverpool area, but he also purchased much land in the area for himself on credit. John Leigh was the local agent of the Tory politician Bamber Gascoyne (1758–1824) and secretary of the "True Blue Club", a Tory political club formed in 1818, to support his election organisation. With the coming of the railways to Liverpool in the 1840s, the value of his holdings increased dramatically. It was remarked of John Leigh, Senior:

"That he had a keen foresight beyond most of his contemporaries into the coming greatness of Liverpool there can be no doubt, but the actuality far exceeded his most sanguine expectations. The railway demands formed an element altogether outside of his calculations however shrewd...The Leighs carried a flair for the timely and well sited purchases of property to a remarkably high degree. And although no doubt their dealings with the railway companies on behalf of the great landowners they represented gave them both an unusual measure of inside information and a degree of monopoly control as vendors of land, the skill with which they made capital from these assets in the early railway age is unusual".

Leigh rebuilt the derelict shell in the style and manner of Smirke, rather than to Adam's earlier plan. In about 1863 "there was found a hoard of Roman coins near Luton, on the estate of John Shaw Leigh, Esq., of Luton Hoo. The coins, which must have been nearly a thousand in number, had been deposited in an imperfectly burnt urn composed of clay and pounded shell and consisted of denarii and small brass, ranging from the time of Caracalla to that of Claudius Gothicus". In 1871 the estate was inherited by his son John Gerard Leigh (1821–1875), who in 1872 married Eleanor Louisa Hawkes (d.1899), a daughter of Thomas Hawkes and widow of Hon. Humble Dudley Ward (1821–1870), a son of William Humble Ward, 10th Baron Ward of Birmingham. She was a close friend of the Prince of Wales. John Gerard Leigh died in 1875, only three years after his marriage, childless. He left his money to his wife Eleanor, together with a life-interest in Luton Hoo, with the remainder to his nephew Henry Leigh.

In 1883 Eleanor remarried to Christian Frederick de Falbe (1828–1896), the Danish ambassador to the United Kingdom, thus becoming known as "Madame de Falbe". She entertained lavishly and during her tenure Luton Hoo began an association with the British royal family. It was in December 1891 that Prince Albert Victor, Duke of Clarence and Avondale, grandson of Queen Victoria, and second in line of the British throne, proposed to his fiancée, Princess Mary of Teck, at Luton Hoo. Madame de Falbe died in 1899 when the estate reverted to her second husband's nephew, Captain Henry Gerard Leigh (1856–1900), 1st Life Guards, who in 1886 had married Marion Lindsay Antrobus, a daughter of Hugh Lindsay Antrobus. He died one year after having inherited Luton Hoo, leaving an 11-year-old son Lt-Col. John Cecil Gerard Leigh (1889–1963), on whose behalf in 1903 Luton Hoo was sold to Sir Julius Wernher, the diamond magnate, who had rented it since 1899. John Leigh later lived at Thorp Satchville Hall, Melton Mowbray, Leicestershire.

=== Wernher ===
In 1903 the house was bought by Sir Julius Wernher, who had made his fortune from the diamond mines of South Africa. Wernher remodelled the interior to the designs of Charles Mewes and Arthur Joseph Davis, the architects of the Ritz Hotel in London. It was at this time that the mansard roof was added, to increase the amount of staff accommodation. This alteration, coupled with the newly installed casement windows was in the Second Empire style of architecture.

The lavish redesigning of the interior in the belle epoque style resulted in an impressive backdrop for Wernher's famous art collection. The marble-walled dining room was designed to display Beauvais tapestries, while the newly installed curving marble staircase enveloped Bergonzoli's statue "The Love of Angels". At the centre of the house the Blue Hall displayed additional tapestries, Louis XV furniture, and Sèvres porcelain. Sir Julius Wernher's widow, later Lady Ludlow, added her collection of English porcelain to the treasures of the house.

The Wernhers' great art collection – equal to that of the Rothschilds, their near neighbours at Waddesdon Manor in Buckinghamshire – was later further enhanced by the marriage of Harold Wernher, the son of Julius Wernher, to Anastasia de Torby, the morganatic daughter of a member of the former Russian imperial family, generally known as "Lady Zia". She brought to the collection an incomparable assembly of Renaissance enamels and Russian artefacts, including works by Peter Carl Fabergé, the Russian imperial court jeweller. Many of the Fabergé items were stolen in the 1990s. For many years, the collection and the house were open to the public, with the house having undergone a major and hugely successful rejuvenation under the direction of Mrs Lucy Phillips, Lady Zia's granddaughter-in-law, which brought back to life the Russian Chapel and opened up new areas of the house whilst also showcasing more of the Wernher art collection.

During World War II the Wernher family allowed the house to serve as Headquarters Eastern Command. Luton Hoo's estate was used as a tank testing ground for the Churchill tanks, which were produced at factories in the town of Luton.

The Wernhers, by virtue of Lady Zia's sister Nadejda de Torby, were very close to Prince Philip, who – along with Elizabeth II – frequently visited Luton Hoo both for public events and private visits. The royal couple spent a number of wedding anniversaries at Luton Hoo.

=== Phillips ===
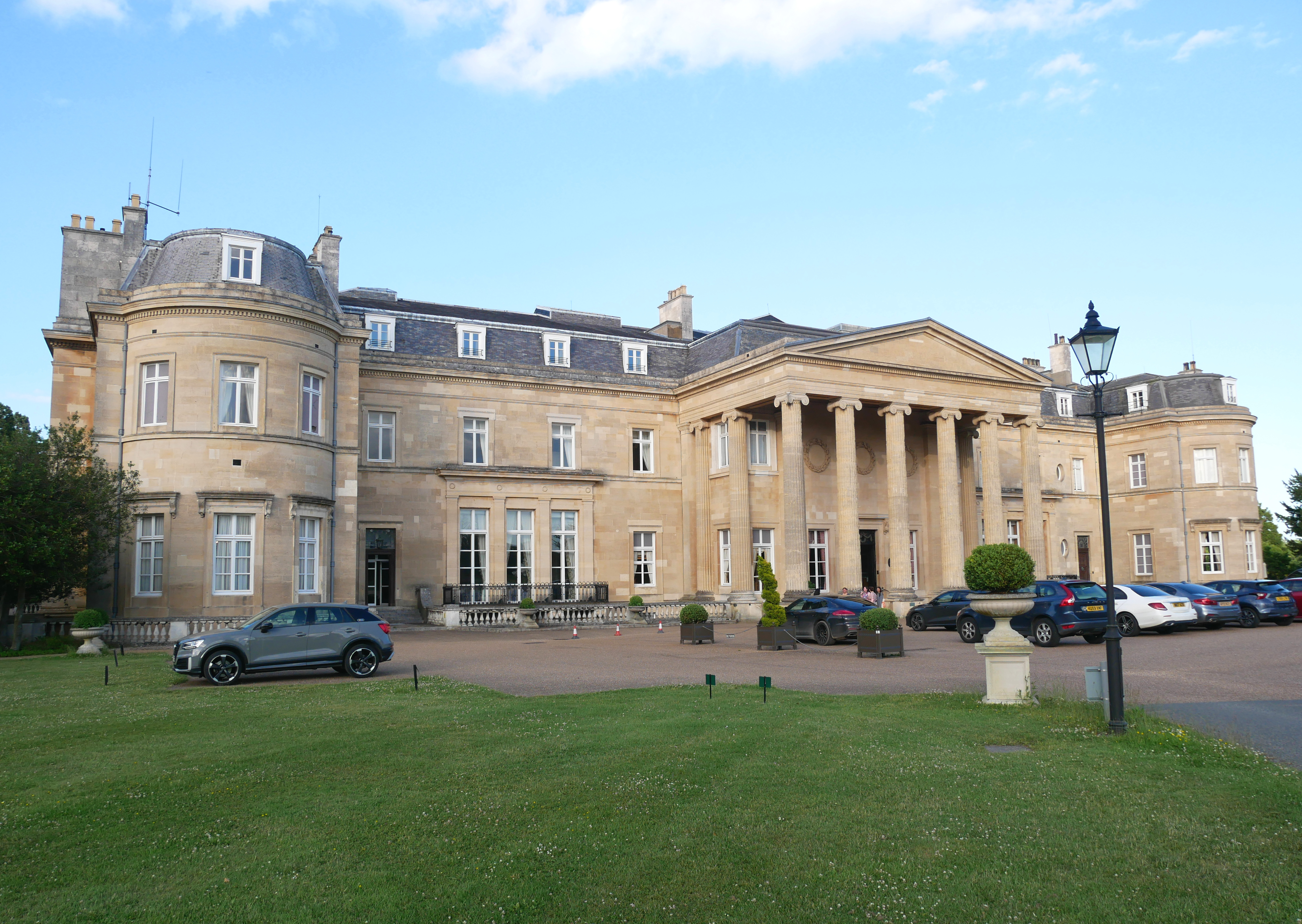
Front view of the house

Following Lady Zia's death in 1977, the estate passed to her grandson Nicholas Harold Phillips, after whose death in 1991 the house and 1,059 acres were sold by his wife. The Phillips family, descendants of Sir Julius and Lady Alice Wernher, still retain ownership of a significant part of the historic estate running it successfully as a diversified business that is home to commercial and residential tenants as well as restoring the walled garden (see below) and one of the busiest non-studio filming locations in the country. Part of the collection, including works by Peter Paul Rubens, Titian and Bartolomé Bermejo, was also sold whilst a portion remains together and is now on permanent display at Ranger's House in Greenwich, London.

In 1996 and 1997, the grounds were hired out for the Tribal Gathering dance music festival and again in 2005, but the latter event was cancelled due to the 7 July 2005 London bombings.

=== Hotel ===
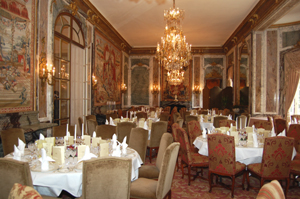
The dining room of the hotel in 2008

The house was converted into a luxury hotel called the Luton Hoo Hotel, Golf, and Spa, which opened in October 2007. It has 228 bedrooms and suites. Part of the restoration project involved rebuilding the second floor of the house, which was included in the plans drawn up by the original architects. The owners, Elite Hotels, indicated that furnishings were selected with the aim of restoring the house to its former glory. In December 2021 the hotel was sold to The Arora Group, a UK-based hotel and property company. Luton Hoo as part of the major refurbishment is having a multi-fume and lazy river splash park built onto the side of the hotel where development work can currently be seen underway

=== Wildlife ===
The Luton Hoo Estate offers a variety of wildlife ranging from red kite, hare, deer and is the only Bedfordshire estate breeding and allowing free-roaming baby ostriches. These can be seen walking around the estate blending in with the wild pheasants. The estate is also one of the only UK sites where mating pairs of possums can be seen in the wild.

== Walled garden ==
Luton Hoo Estate also possesses a 5-acre (20,000 m^{2}) octagonal walled garden which was established by John Stuart, 3rd Earl of Bute, in the late 1760s. Successive owners of the estate adapted the garden to match the changing fashions in gardens over the years. Numerous heated glasshouses were built by the Leigh family in the last quarter of the 19th century for the production of fruit and flowers. The largest of the glasshouses, built by the firm of Mackenzie and Moncur for Sir Julius and Lady Alice Wernher, is evidence of the extravagance of the Edwardian period. The garden underwent extensive restoration in 2001–2021, with the help of over 100 volunteers, and is open to visitors and tours every Wednesday from May to October.

== Film location ==
Luton Hoo has appeared in a number of productions including A Shot in the Dark, Never Say Never Again, Four Weddings and a Funeral, Eyes Wide Shut, The Secret Garden, Princess Caraboo, Wilde, The World Is Not Enough, Quills, Enigma, De-Lovely and Bright Young Things. In 2010 the farm buildings were used as a location for the John Landis film Burke & Hare, and stood in for Bleeding Heart Yard in the BBC TV series Little Dorrit using sets designed originally for the BBC's 2005 Bleak House. On 13 and 14 October 2010, filming of parts of the Steven Spielberg film War Horse took place at the Luton Hoo Estate. Luton Hoo stood in for Chequers, in the film Ali G Indahouse. Luton Hoo was also used as a location in the 2020 Netflix film Enola Holmes. British boyband Five filmed the music video for their 2000 single "Don't Wanna Let You Go" at Luton Hoo. Both the 2017 Joss Whedon and 2021 Zack Snyder release of Justice League credit the estate.

== See also ==
- 18th-century Western domes
