= Crisp Gascoyne =

British merchant, politician and philanthropist (1700–1761)

Sir Crisp Gascoyne
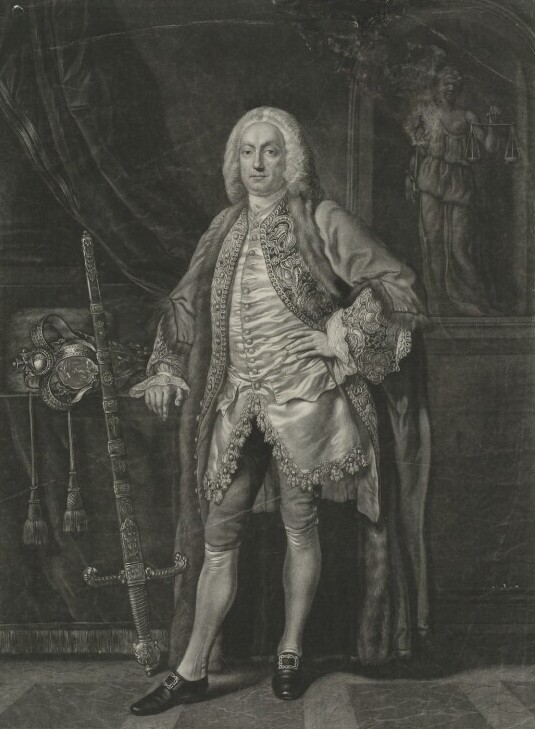
- Born: 1700; Chiswick
- Died: 28 December 1761 (aged 60–61); London
- Spouse(s): Margaret, daughter and coheiress of Dr. John Bamber
- Children: Bamber, Joseph, Ann, Margaret

Sir Crisp Gascoyne (c. 1700 – 28 December 1761) was a British merchant, politician and philanthropist who served as the Lord Mayor of London in 1752.

== Early life ==
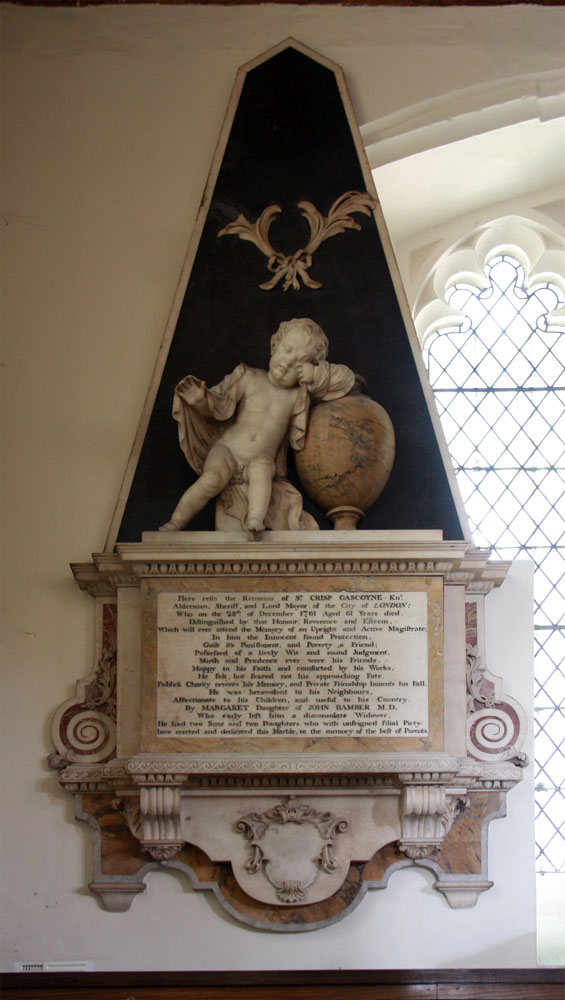
Monument to Gascoyne in St Margaret's Church, Barking

The youngest son of Benjamin and Anne Gascoyne was born at Chiswick, and baptised in its parish church on 26 August 1700. He set up in business as a brewer in Gravel Lane, Houndsditch. His residence was at Barking in 1733, and the baptisms of his four youngest children are recorded there between 1733 and 1738. In 1755 he is described as of Mincing Lane, where he probably lived in the house of his father-in-law, Dr. Bamber, though still carrying on the brewhouse in Houndsditch in partnership with one Weston. Gascoyne was admitted a freeman of the Worshipful Company of Brewers by redemption (purchase) 17 December 1741, he took the clothing of the livery 8 March 1744, fined for the offices of steward and the three grades of wardenship 19 August 1746, and was elected an assistant 11 October 1745, and master of the company for 1746–1747.

== Political life ==
Gascoyne was elected alderman of Vintry ward 20 June 1745, and sworn into office on 2 July. He served the office of sheriff of London and Middlesex in 1747–1748. In December 1748 he took a prominent part, at the head of the committee of city lands, in passing through the common council an act for the relief of the orphans of the City of London, whose estates, vested in the guardianship of the corporation, had greatly suffered through the exactions of the Civil War period and the illegal closing of the exchequer by Charles II. Gascoyne became Lord Mayor in 1752, and was the first chief magistrate who occupied the present Mansion House, the building of which had been commenced in 1739 on the site of Stocks Market. Owing to the change of style, the date of the mayoralty procession was this year altered from 29 October to 9 November.

Gascoyne presided as lord mayor at the trial of the women Squires and Wells, convicted of kidnapping Elizabeth Canning. His suspicions being aroused he started further inquiries, which resulted in proving that Canning's accusation was false. The mob took Canning's part, insulted the lord mayor, breaking his coach windows, and even threatening his life. Gascoyne justified himself in an address to the liverymen of London, and received a vote of thanks from the common council at the end of his year of office.

Early in his mayoralty, 22 November 1752, Gascoyne was knighted on the occasion of presenting an address to the king; he was also a verderer of Epping Forest, in which office he was succeeded by his eldest son. He purchased large estates in Essex, including the buildings and grounds of an ancient hospital and chapel at Ilford, and the right of presentation to the living (see Impropriation).

== Death and estate ==
Gascoyne died on 28 December 1761, and was buried on 4 January 1762 in Barking Church, in the north aisle of which is a large monument with an inscription, erected to his memory by his four children. His will, dated 20 December 1761, was proved in the P.C.C. 4 January 1762 (St. Eloy, 13).

He married Margaret, daughter and co-heiress of Dr. John Bamber, a wealthy physician of Mincing Lane, who purchased large estates in Essex and built the mansion of Bifrons at Barking. A drawing of this house as it appeared in 1794 is preserved in the Guildhall Library copy of Daniel Lysons's Environs (vol. iv. pt. i. p. 88). Gascoyne had four surviving children—Bamber, Joseph, Ann and Margaret. His wife was buried in Barking Church 10 October 1740.

Dr. Bamber died in November 1753, and his property descended in entail to Bamber Gascoyne I (1725–1791), the eldest son. Bamber Gascoyne entered Queen's College, Oxford (1743); was barrister of Lincoln's Inn (1750); was M.P. for Malden 1761–63, Midhurst 1765–70, Weobly 1770–1774, Truro 1774–1784, and Bossiney 1784–1786; and was also receiver-general of customs and a lord of the admiralty. On his death in 1791 the Bamber estates descended to his son Bamber (1758–1824), M.P. for Liverpool 1780–96, who cut off the entail, pulled down the house of Bifrons, and sold the site and park. His daughter and heiress married the second Marquis of Salisbury, who took the name of Gascoyne before that of Cecil, and became possessed of the Bamber property, worth, it is said, £12000 a year (Munk's Roll). Their son was Robert Gascoyne-Cecil, 3rd Marquess of Salisbury, three times prime minister.

A mezzotint portrait of Crisp Gascoyne by James McArdell, from a painting by William Keable, was published in the London Magazine for July 1753. There is a smaller and anonymous print, probably of the same date.
