= Henry Rawlinson =

Henry Rawlinson may refer to:

- Henry Rawlinson (MP) (1743–1786), Member of Parliament for Liverpool in the late 18th century
- Sir Henry Rawlinson, 1st Baronet (1810–1895), British diplomat and Orientalist
- Henry Rawlinson, 1st Baron Rawlinson (1864–1925), his son, British general in the First World War
- Sir Henry Rawlinson, a fictional character created by Vivian Stanshall, used most notably on the 1978 album Sir Henry at Rawlinson End
