= William Keable =

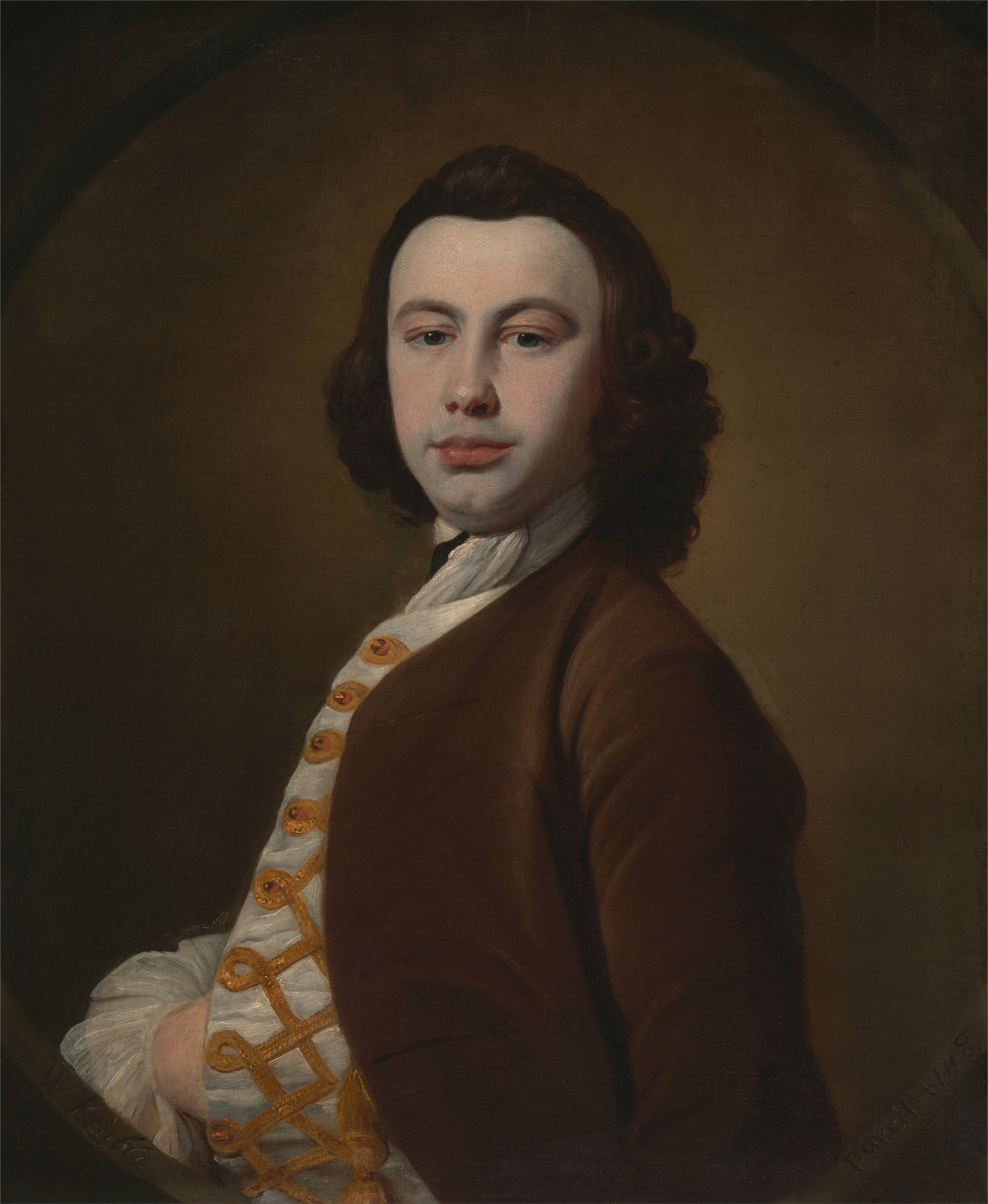
Self-Portrait, 1748

William Keable (or Keeble) (1715–1774) was an English painter of portraits and conversation pieces.

He was the son of John and Ann Keable and baptised at Cratfield, Suffolk in October 1715.

His main period of success as an artist was in the 1740s and 1750s; he was a member of the St Martin’s Lane Academy in 1754. He specialised in the painting of portraits, especially of American colonists, particularly from Charleston, South Carolina, who were visiting London. Typical of his work were the portraits of Mrs Benjamin Smith (1722-1760) and her brother-in-law Thomas Smith Jr (1719-1790) in 1749. He was also an amateur musician.

By 1761 he had left England to settle in Italy, where he continued to paint portraits, becoming a member of the Accademico della Clementina in 1770. He died in Italy in 1774 and was buried in Livorno.

== Works ==
- Self Portrait (1748). Yale Center for British Art
- Portrait of a Gentleman
- Mrs Benjamin Smith (1749). Gibbes Museum of Art, Charleston, South Carolina
- Thomas Smith Jnr (1749)
- Castruccio Bonamici Gandolfini (after 1761)
- A mezzotint portrait of Sir Crisp Gascoyne, Lord Mayor of London by James McArdell, from a painting by William Keable, was published in the London Magazine for July 1753.
