= James Ibbetson =

James Ibbetson, D.D., J.P. (1717–1781) was Archdeacon of St Albans in the Church of England from 13 September 1754 until his death on 12 August 1781.

== Life ==
He was the son of Ebenezer Ibbetson, of the parish of St Martin, Ludgate in the City of London, a silk merchant who imported mantuas from the Netherlands. He matriculated at Exeter College, Oxford in 1734, at age 16. He was a Fellow of the college from 1737 to 1749, graduating B.A. in 1740 and M.A. in 1741. He received the divinity degrees of B.D. in 1748 and D.D. in 1752.

Ibbetson was the incumbent at Merton, Oxfordshire in 1747. He was then presented to Bushey, Hertfordshire in 1748, by his father, who had a limited patronage under the will of Grace Smith.

== Works ==
- A Plea for the subscription of the Clergy to the thirty-nine articles of religion (1767). This work was an early criticism of the proposals by Francis Blackburne to relax the religious tests in the Church of England.

== Family ==
Ibbetson's children included:

- James (1755–1790), a barrister, and the husband of Agnes Ibbetson, the plant physiologist.
- Denzil (born 1756/7), cleric who became rector of Halstead.
- Charlotte, second daughter, married William Boscawen.

Church of England titles
Preceded by John Cole	Archdeacon of St Albans; 1754–1781	Succeeded by Samuel Horsley
