= Cratfield =

Village in Suffolk, England

Coordinates: 52.326475°N 1.390479°E

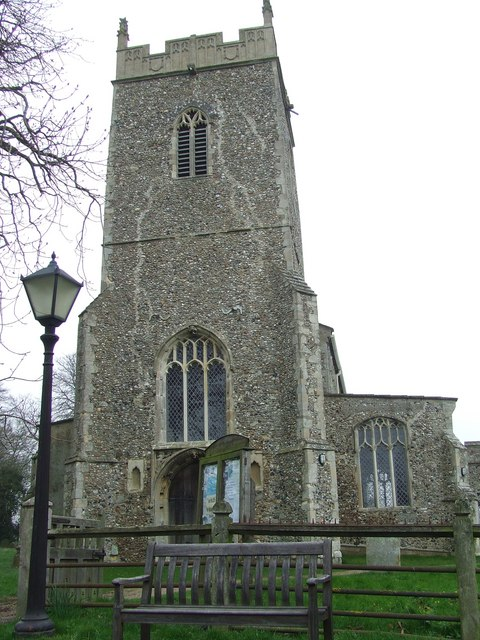
- Church of St Mary, Cratfield

- Location within Suffolk
- Population: 292 (2011)
- OS grid reference: TM 315 755
- District: East Suffolk
- Shire county: Suffolk
- Region: East
- Country: England
- Sovereign state: United Kingdom
- Post town: Halesworth
- Postcode district: IP19
- Dialling code: 01986
- UK Parliament: Suffolk Coastal

Cratfield is a village in northern Suffolk, England. "It has a population of 292 according to the 2011 census." Neighbouring villages include Laxfield, Metfield, Cookley, Huntingfield, Heveningham. The nearest town, Halesworth, is approximately 6.7 miles (10.7 km) away. Southwold is a nearby popular seaside resort. The market town of Framlingham is also close by.

Cratfield is a small farming and residential community. It currently has no shop but there are several bed and breakfast hotels. Its only pub, The Cratfield Poacher, closed in 2017. Cratfield is also home to the Grade I-listed St Mary's Church (14th/15th/16th century), built of flint and with a square tower.

Cratfield means 'Craeta open land', which refers to open country, land without trees, level ground, land without buildings) and arable land (from late tenth century).

== Geography ==
Cratfield is approximately 115 miles north-east of London, 29 miles north of Ipswich and 29 miles south of Norwich. Furthermore it is 7.5 miles from the coast and lies 49 metres above sea level. The area is built on a mixture of London Clay (which is very dense) and chalk and believed to be aged between 1.5 and 3.5 million years old. It is also mixed in with volcanic ash, which proves that there must have been volcanic activity in the past.

== Modern town ==
Cratfield currently has 26 listed buildings, 25 of them Grade II listed and St Mary's church Grade I listed. Cratfield has a village hall situated on Manse Lane, which can hold up to 100 people and is used for the 'Pop-up Pub' on the first Friday of each month along with regular clubs and societies.

The nearest primary school is All Saints Church of England primary school in Laxfield and the nearest secondary school is Stradbroke High School. Unfortunately Cratfield has no bus services apart from school transport contracts operating under Suffolk County Council to Stradbroke High and Thomas Mills in Framlingham. Cratfield has two holiday cottages (School farm cottages and Holly tree barns). The area also has a fairly high car and van count with the number being at 252, adding to the 77,473 other vehicles based in the Suffolk Coastal region.

Cratfield doesn't have much cultural diversity according to the 2011 census report, with 201 of its population being of a Christian background and another 86 with no religion or not stating their religion. There was one Buddhist and two of Jewish religion. This shows that Cratfield has not been culturally diversified, which could be to do with its lack of job prospects and housing.

Cratfield has had two churches and three cemeteries in the past but currently has one church (St Mary's) and two cemeteries (St Mary's and Burial ground). The oldest part of the church is 14th century and the tower is 15th century. In 1547, under Edward VI, "the parish sold all its silver rather than let it fall into government hands and therefore spent the proceeds on decorating the tower, for which they are to be commended and remembered."

== Historical writings ==
In 1870–72 John Marius Wilson's Imperial Gazetteer of England and Wales described the village as:

Cratfield, a parish in Blything district, Suffolk; 6 miles WSW of Halesworth r. station. It has a post office under Halesworth. Acres, 2, 085. Real property, £3, 964. P, 604. Houses, 139. The property is divided among a few. Part of the land is common. The living is a vicarage in the Diocese of Norwich. Value, £116. Patron, the Rev. E. Hollond. The church is later English, with square tower, and good; and there is an Independent chapel. A school has £9 from endowment; and other charities £171.

In 1887 John Bartholomew also wrote an entry on Cratfield in the Gazetteer of the British Isles with a much shorter description:

Cratfield, par., E. Suffolk, 6 miles SW. of Halesworth ry. sta., 2085 ac., pop. 495; P.O.

== Notable residents ==
- John Laney, politician, lawyer and member of parliament during Queen Elizabeth I's reign and especially in the years between 1586 and 1589 as he was occasionally made of use by the Privy Council to settle disputes in Suffolk.
- William Keable, 18th C. painter of portraits and conversation pieces

== Demography ==
According to the Census report for Cratfield, the biggest decline in population took part between 1891 and 1901, with the village decreasing by 75 people, 47 of whom were males and 28 females. this would have been due to a mixture of the elderly dying and poor health through diseases. On the other hand the biggest increase in population across the time scale was from 1801 to 1811 with an increase of 100 people, 35 male and 65 female. The population has stayed fairly consistent between males and females across the time series, however there has been a few anomalies such as in 1951 there was 32 more males (172 males to 140 females) and in 1811 where there was 2 more females (313 males to 338 females). Cratfield's area (in acres) has also expanded from 1,930 in 1831 to 2,127 which isn't a huge difference but still an expansion nevertheless.

The Index of Multiple Deprivation (IMD) ranks Cratfield as 13,041 out of 32,844 in England. It is believed that employment is better than 65% of areas in England, Health is better than 86%, education is better than 53%, crime is better than 74% and overall better than 39% of the country. Cratfield's population shows that it is one that is neither significantly of old age, but neither is it a youth population. The largest age group is the 45 to 59 and the second largest is 30 to 44, this shows that it is very middle aged and for people with family which explains the 70 people under the age of 19 living in Cratfield. The population density is 0.3 persons per hectare.

According to the 2011 census there is not a large difference of people working full-time and people working part-time (full-time 170 and part-time 112). However, for the people who are in full-time work, the highest number of people have to travel between 10 kilometres and 20 kilometres (between 6.2 and 12.4 miles) to get to work, furthermore according to the census 7 people have to travel over 60 kilometres ( 37.3 miles and over). This shows that Cratfield is a distance from most businesses and industrial areas, which are located in bigger towns such as Halesworth which is approximately 6.7 miles away.

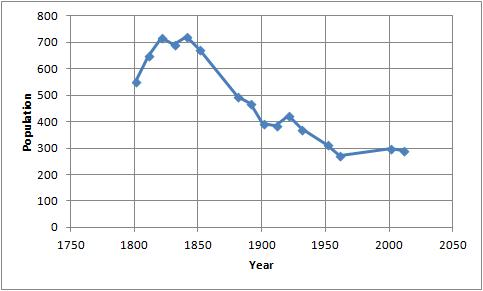
Total population of Cratfield Civil Parish, Suffolk, as reported by the census of population from 1801 to 2011.

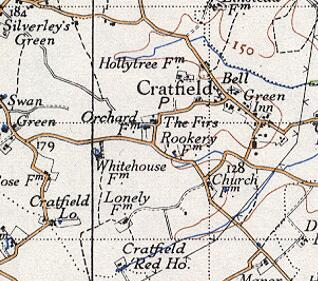
Cratfield 20th century map

== Economy ==
According to the 1831 occupation census in Cratfield, there were 22 professionals, 43 middling sorts, 103 servants and then 6 'others'. The 43 middling sorts were the middle class and meant that they were either craftsmen or farmers. In the case of Cratfield due to its open, arable land, most or all of them were small-scale farmers. To add to this, the 22 professionals that were in the area made up the upper class, whom would have employed a large number of the servants in the area.

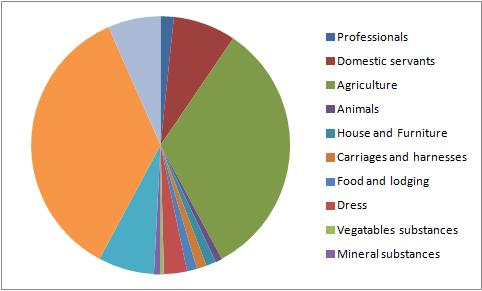
Occupation structure from 1881 census in Cratfield

The 1881 Occupation structure census shows that a large proportion of people worked in agriculture or construction of carriages. This is because, as explained in the name Cratfield (Craeta open land), there is arable land which can and is used for farming and agricultural needs. As well as this, there is a noticeable number of domestic servants which shows that there must have been a few wealthy people living in this area during this time period.

According to the 2011 census, the number of people aged between 16 and 74, in employment in Cratfield, was 141. To break down the 141 people employed in Cratfield, 18 of them are managers, directors, or senior officials. 20 of them are technical occupants which covers jobs in the public sector such as health and teaching, while 13 have administrative jobs, 34 have skilled trades which include jobs such as plumbers and builders. 12 are employed in care, leisure, 2 are in sales, 7 are in machine operations and 18 are in elementary occupations.
