= Sir William Meredith, 3rd Baronet =

British landowner and politician

Sir William Meredith, 3rd Baronet (c. 1725 – 2 January 1790), was a British landowner who sat in the House of Commons from 1754 to 1780. A Rockingham Whig, he served as a Lord of the Admiralty from 1765 to 1766.

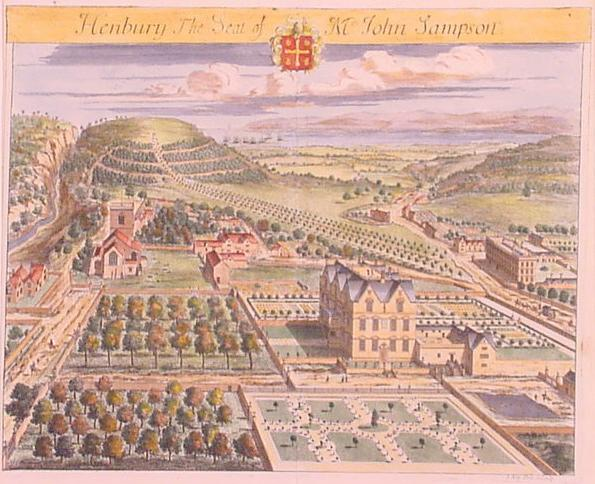
Depiction of Henbury Hall in 1707

== Early life ==
Meredith was the son of Amos Meredith (1688–1745) of Chester and Johanna Cholmondely, daughter of Thomas Cholmondely of Vale Royal, Chester. He matriculated at Christ Church, Oxford, on 24 March 1743, aged 18. His father died in 1744, and in 1752, he inherited his baronetcy and estates on the death of his grandfather, Sir William Meredith, 2nd Baronet.

== Political career ==
At the 1754 general election, Meredith was returned unopposed as one of the two Members of Parliament for Wigan. By the time of the 1761 general election, the opposition at Wigan had consolidated against him and he stood instead for Liverpool, where he was returned after a contest. As one of the Rockingham Whigs, he served as a Lord of the Admiralty from 1765 to 1766. He was returned unopposed for Liverpool at the 1768 general election. In 1774, he was sworn of the Privy Council and appointed Comptroller of the Household, and at the subsequent 1774 general election was again returned unopposed. Meredith was an extravagant man, and in 1779 was obliged to sell the family estate at Henbury, Cheshire, to John Bower Jodrell for £24,000. He did not stand in 1780 because of ill-health. In 1784 he stood again at Liverpool but withdrew before the end of the poll.

== Later life and legacy ==
Meredith died unmarried in Lyon, France, on 2 January 1790. His only brother Theophilus had died in 1775 leaving a daughter, and so the baronetcy became extinct. Of his sisters,

- Elizabeth married William Bankes of Winstanley Hall, whose son William was High Sheriff of Lancashire;
- Henrietta married Hon. Frederick Vane (brother of Henry Vane, 2nd Earl of Darlington);
- Anne married Barlow Trecothick, on 9 June 1770, while he was Lord Mayor of London;
- Anna-Margaretta was the third wife of Assheton Curzon, 1st Viscount Curzon;
- Mary married firstly Laurence Shirley, 4th Earl Ferrers, and secondly Lord Frederick Campbell.

The town of Meredith, New Hampshire, is named after him.

Parliament of Great Britain
| Preceded by Richard Clayton; Hon. Richard Barry | Member of Parliament for Wigan; 1754–1761; With: Hon. Richard Barry | Succeeded by Fletcher Norton; Simon Luttrell |
| Preceded by Sir Ellis Cunliffe; Charles Pole | Member of Parliament for Liverpool; 1761–1780; With: Sir Ellis Cunliffe 1761–1767; Richard Pennant 1767–1780 | Succeeded by Bamber Gascoyne; Henry Rawlinson |
Political offices
| Preceded by Thomas Pelham | Comptroller of the Household; 1774–1777 | Succeeded by The Lord Onslow |
Baronetage of Nova Scotia
| Preceded by William Meredith | Baronet (of Marston); 1752–1790 | Dormant |
