= Childwall Hall =

Coordinates: 53.3930°N 2.8829°W

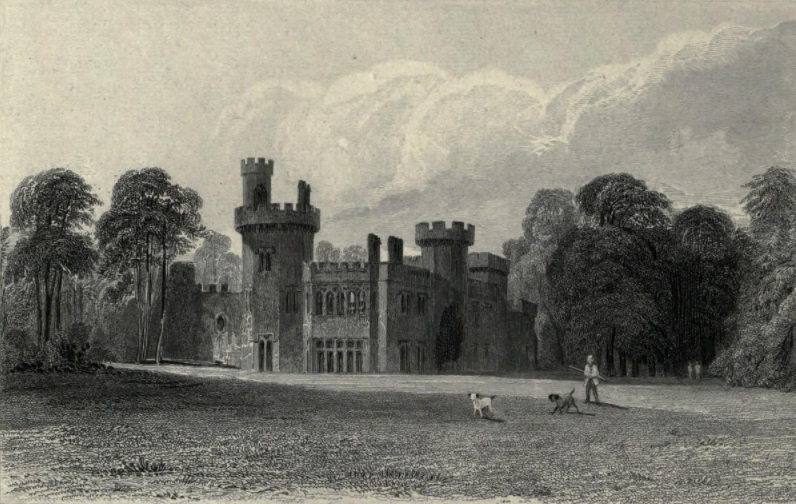
- Drawing from 1832
- Interactive map of the Childwall Hall area

General information
- Architectural style: Gothic Revival
- Location: Liverpool, England
- Completed: 1813
- Demolished: 1949

Design and construction
- Architect: John Nash

Childwall Hall was a 19th-century English country house located in Childwall, Liverpool, England. Built on the site of a previous mansion of the same name the Gothic Revival building was the seat of parliamentarian Bamber Gascoyne (the younger), a noted opponent of the abolition of slavery. The main building was demolished in 1949 and the current site is now occupied by a television production company Lime Pictures. A lodge building and a few ruins of the same style are all that remain of the hall.

== History ==
Ownership of an estate in Childwall can be traced as far back as the 13th century when William de Ferrers, 4th Earl of Derby became its heir upon his marriage to Agnes of Chester, daughter of Hugh of Cyfeiliog, 5th Earl of Chester. By 1303 the land had been obtained by Robert Holland, 1st Baron Holand and by 1361 was recorded as being the property of Henry of Grosmont, 1st Duke of Lancaster. The estate continued to pass between noblemen: from Robert de Lanthom to John Stanley (KG) before being obtained by the Le Grey family who sold it to lawyer Isaac Greene of Liverpool. Upon Greene's death in 1749 his daughter Mary inherited the estate and married Bamber Gascoyne (the elder). By 1780 their son Bamber Gascoyne (the younger) was elected MP for Liverpool and eventually inherited the family estate, which he decided to have rebuilt.

For the rebuild Bamber Gascoyne (the younger) employed architect John Nash, who at the time was architect to the Surveyor General of Woods, Forests, Parks, and Chases and rarely took private commissions. Nash's Gothic design, which was completed in 1813, was made of local Red Sandstone and built to resemble the battlements of a castle, similar to Nash's own previously built home of East Cowes Castle. The new interior of Childwall Hall included a drawing room, a dining room, a study and a well-furnished library at the request of Gascoyne, who was a keen reader. On the death of Bamber the younger in 1824, the hall and surrounding estate passed to his only child Francis Mary Gascoyne, who a few years previously had married James Gascoyne-Cecil, 2nd Marquess of Salisbury and moved away from the area. Subsequently the estate was put out to rent and became the residence of various wealthy families.

In 1922 the nearby Childwall Golf Club moved into the hall after the owners of its previous site at Woolton Hall announced their intention to sell the land. The Golf Club remained at Childwall Hall until 1938, at which point it relocated to its current home in Gateacre leaving the hall unoccupied. A year later the owner of Childwall Hall sold the surrounding 50 acres of land to Liverpool Corporation; now Liverpool City Council for £10,000 (£695,491 in 2021) and included the now derelict hall in the sale. Liverpool Corporation had initially intended to convert the hall into a further education college; however, the remaining structure proved unsuitable, and after the discovery of dry rot a decision was made to demolish it. A new building named Childwall Hall County College was built and opened on 25 February 1955. Decades later the land was sold to Mersey Television (now Lime Pictures) for £370,000 on 16 August 1990 who remain the current occupant.

=== Childwall Hall Lodge ===
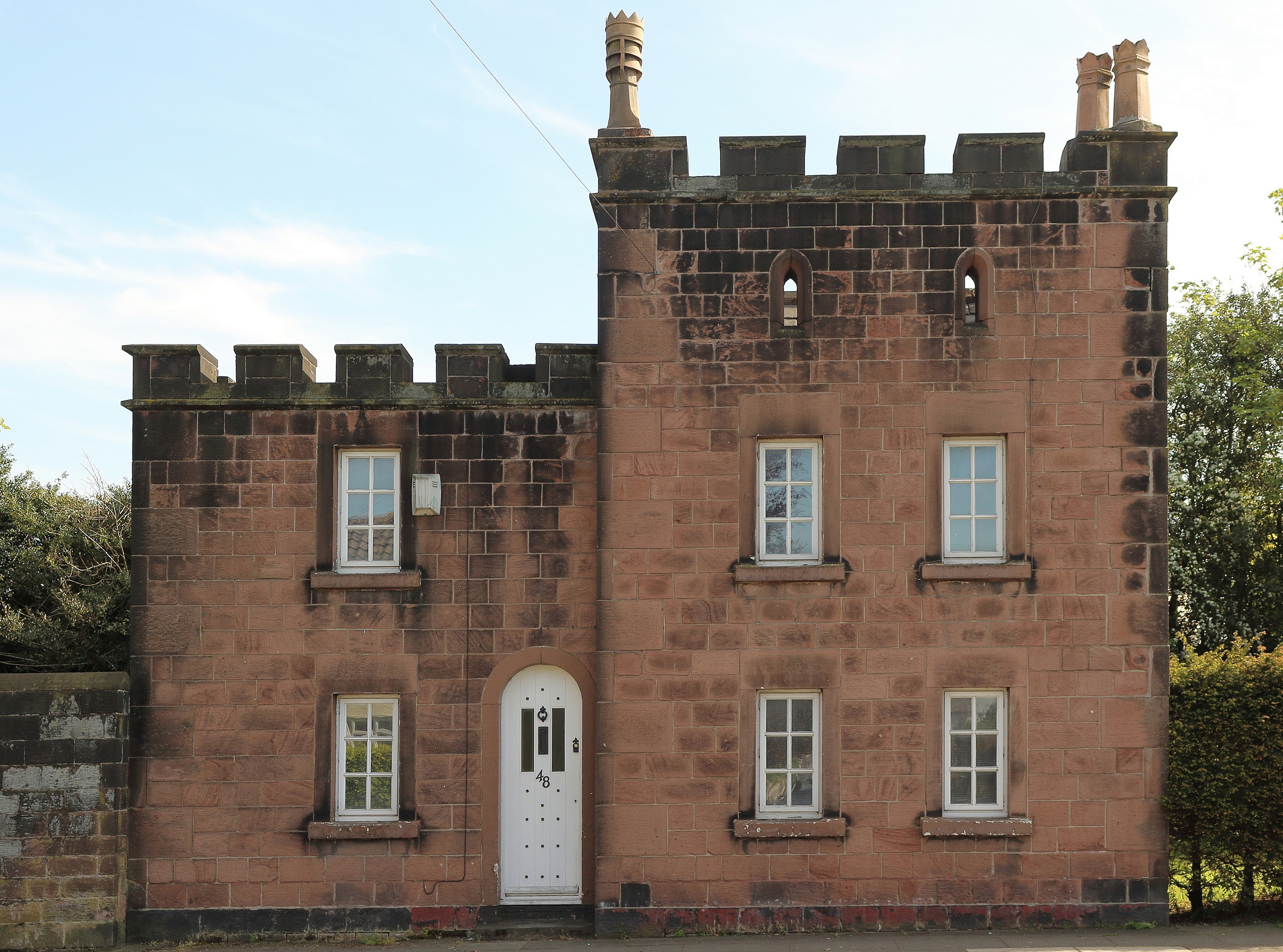
Childwall Hall Lodge

Although the main hall was demolished in 1949, a lodge building located to the west of the former hall remains intact. It has two storeys, and is in three bays, the first bay being lower and recessed, and containing a round-headed entrance. The windows are lancets containing casements. At the top of the building is an embattled parapet. The Lodge was designated a Grade II listed building on 14 March 1975.
