= William Boscawen =

English barrister, author and translator

William Boscawen (28 August 1752 – 8 May 1811) was an English barrister, author and translator.

== Life ==
Boscawen was a younger son of General George Boscawen and Anne Trevor, and nephew of Edward Boscawen. His elder brother was George Boscawen, M.P. He was educated at Eton College, under Dr. Barnard. He became a gentleman-commoner of Exeter College, Oxford, in 1770.

In London Boscawen entered the Middle Temple. He studied law under Francis Buller, and went the western circuit. He was appointed a commissioner in bankruptcy, and in 1785 was made a Victualling Commissioner.

Boscawen died of asthma, at Little Chelsea, aged 58.

== Works ==
Boscawen published legal works including Treatise on Convictions on Penal Statutes (1792). He translated works of Horace: the Odes, Epodes, Carmen Seculare; then the Satires, Epistles, and Art of Poetry. His notes owed much to John Foster, of Eton College. Thomas James Mathias was scathing about his ability as translator.

In the period 1798 to 1801, Boscawen published original poems and other works. He was also a contributor to the Gentleman's Magazine, and to the British Critic. For a long time he wrote annual verses for the Literary Fund.

== Family ==
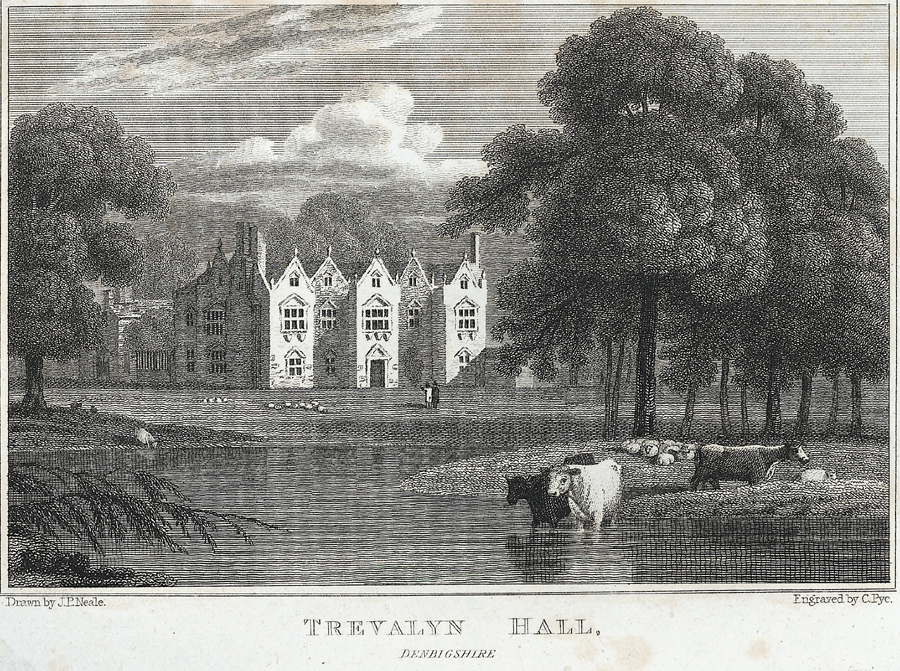
Trevalyn Hall, 1818 engraving

With his wife, Charlotte Ibbetson, daughter of the Rev. James Ibbetson, Boscawen had five daughters. They were:

1. Grace Trevor Charlotte, married 1828 William Fleming.
2. Anna Annabella (died 1825), married Rev. Christopher Parkins of Gresford.
3. Catherine Emily, married 1823 Henry Rowlands.
4. Elizabeth Mary, married 1830 Thomas Griffith of Chester.
5. Julia, died 1832.

His surviving daughters became heiresses to the Trevalyn Hall estate in Denbighshire of his mother, when his elder brother George died childless in 1833. Elizabeth Mary Griffith resided there, and was mother to Boscawen Trevor Griffith (born 1835).
