= Richard Pennant, 1st Baron Penrhyn =

British politician (1737–1808)

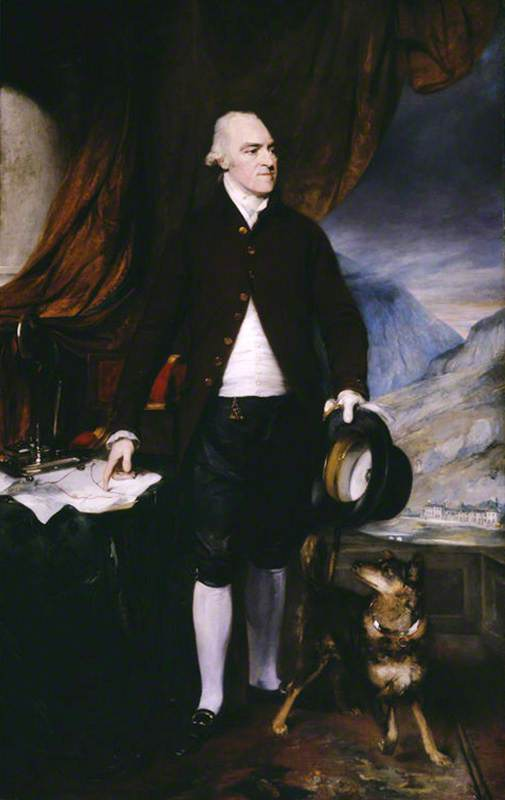
Portrait of Richard Pennant by Henry Thomson

Richard Pennant, 1st Baron Penrhyn (1737 – 21 January 1808) was a British politician who represented Petersfield and Liverpool in the House of Commons of Great Britain from 1761 to 1790. He was the owner of Penrhyn Castle, an estate on the outskirts on Bangor, North Wales. Pennant was also an absentee owner of six sugar plantations and slaves in Jamaica. In Parliament, Pennant opposed the British abolitionist movement. In Wales, Pennant was a major figure in the development of the Welsh slate industry. He received an Irish peerage from George III in 1783, and died in 1808, leaving his estates to George Hay Dawkins.

== Early life ==
Pennant was the second son of John Pennant, a Liverpool-based merchant, and his wife Bonella Hodges, a wealthy heiress from the British colony of Jamaica. He was educated at Newcome's School in Hackney, and was admitted to Trinity College, Cambridge on 18 January 1754.

== Political career ==
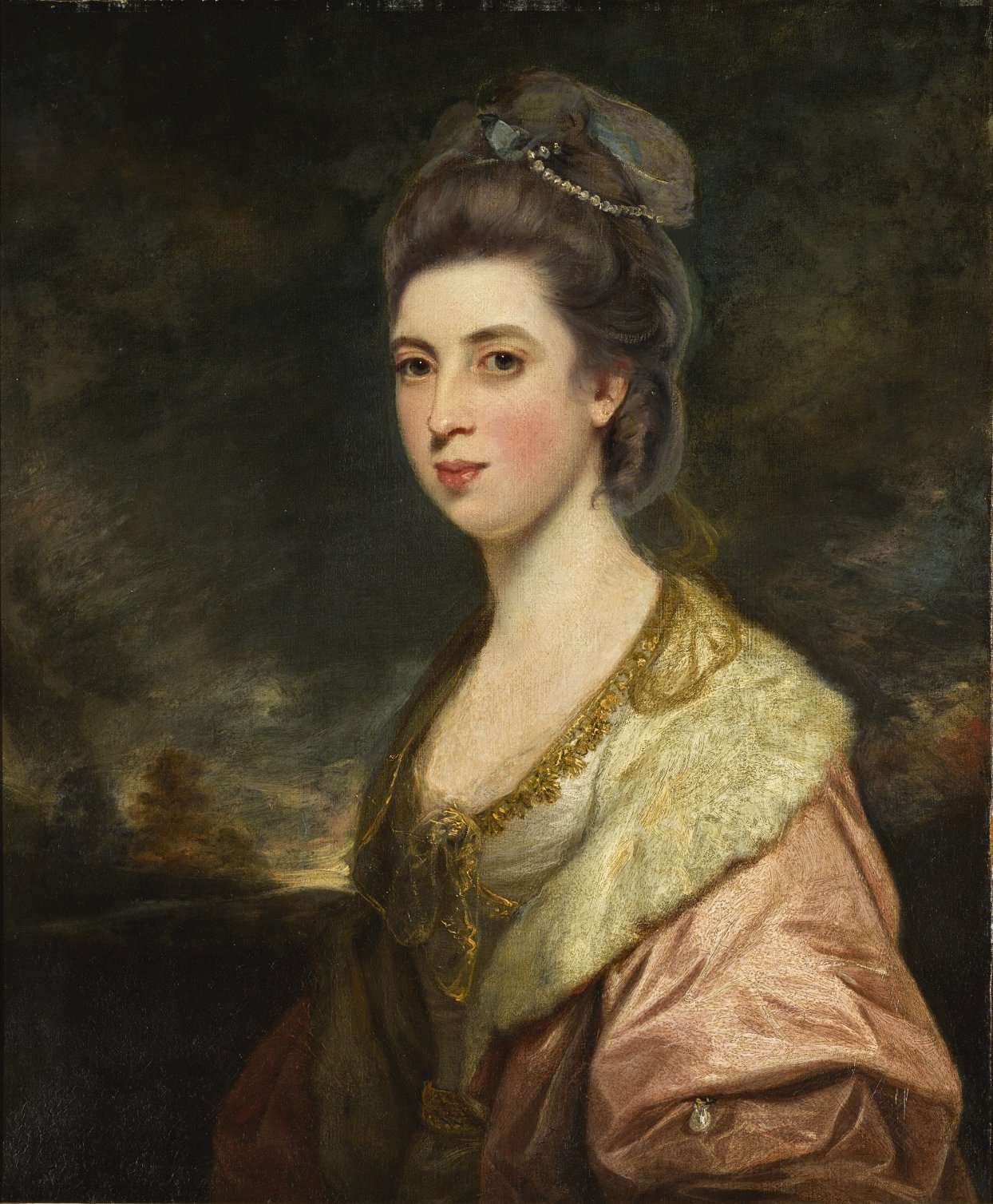
A portrait of Richard's wife, Anne Susanna Pennant, by Joshua Reynolds

Pennant entered the House of Commons as an MP representing Petersfield at the 1761 general election alongside William Jolliffe under an arrangement with William Beckford. He intended to represent Liverpool in the House of Commons at the next election, but when a vacancy arose in 1767, he was returned unopposed at a by-election on 4 December 1767. He successfully contested Liverpool in 1768, and again in 1774. In the 1780 general election, he was defeated at Liverpool. On the recommendation of Charles James Fox, he was granted an Irish peerage from King George III and created 1st Baron Penrhyn of Penrhyn in the county of Lough, Ireland in 1783. Holding an Irish peerage did not disqualify him from standing for elections to the House of Commons as, both before and after the Acts of Union, Irish peerages were used to create peers who could not sit in the House of Lords but who could do so in the House of Commons.

In the 1784 general election, Penrhyn again contested Liverpool and was returned as MP to Parliament. In the ensuing parliament he is said to have made over thirty speeches relating to the West Indies and trade in Liverpool. There was a debate on the slave trade in May 1788, and it was reported that the only two MP's who spoke in favor of the trade were Penrhyn and Bamber Gascoyne. He stood again for Liverpool at the 1790 general election and was ahead in the poll, but withdrew in favour of Sir Banastre Tarleton.

== Estates and involvement in slate industry ==
Pennant owned numerous properties in Caernarfonshire, Wales, half of which he inherited from his wife, Ann Susannah Pennant née Warburton, the daughter of British Army officer Hugh Warburton; the other half he inherited from his father, who was Warburton's business partner. As the owner of Penrhyn quarry, he was prominent in the development of the Welsh slate industry.

Pennant was also the absentee owner of six sugar plantations in Jamaica, which were operated with the forced labour of over six hundred enslaved Africans. Despite this, Pennant never visited the island, managing them from his estates in Britain. The wealth Pennant generated from his sugar plantations were invested by him into road and dock construction, alongside the Welsh slate industry- most prominently the Penrhyn quarry.

== Death and legacy ==
On his death on 21 January 1808, Penrhyn's entire estate went to his second cousin, politician George Hay Dawkins, who subsequently adopted the surname of Dawkins-Pennant. Dawkins' daughter Juliana and her husband were named as co-heirs of the estate on the condition that they also took the surname Pennant, which they duly accepted. Dawkins' son-in-law, Edward Gordon Douglas, was later created 1st Baron Penrhyn of Llandygai. The widowed Lady Penrhyn moved to a home in Grosvenor Square.

Parliament of Great Britain
Preceded by Sir John Philipps, Bt; William Gerard Hamilton	Member of Parliament for Petersfield; 1761–1767; With: John Jolliffe	Succeeded by John Jolliffe; Richard Croftes
Preceded by Ellis Cunliffe; William Meredith	Member of Parliament for Liverpool; 1767–1780; With: Bamber Gascoyne	Succeeded by Bamber Gascoyne; Henry Rawlinson
Preceded by Bamber Gascoyne; Henry Rawlinson	Member of Parliament for Liverpool; 1784–1790; With: Bamber Gascoyne	Succeeded by Bamber Gascoyne; Sir Banastre Tarleton
Peerage of Ireland
New creation	Baron Penrhyn; 1783–1808	Extinct
