= Frederick Gascoyne =

New Zealand Armed Constabulary officer and magistrate

Frederick John William Gascoyne (1837 or 1838 – 13 December 1926) was a New Zealand Armed Constabulary officer and Magistrate.

== Biography ==
Gascoyne was born in Cawnpore, India, in 1837 to Charles Manners Gascoigne and his wife Isabella Gascoigne (née Campbell). His paternal great-grandfather was the english politician Bamber Gascoyne (1725–1791).

He married Marion Carr in 1872. They had no children. Gascoyne published Soldiering in New Zealand in 1916. Gascoyne died in Hastings on 13 December 1926.
