= John Laney =

English politician

John Laney (died 1633), of Cratfield and Ipswich, Suffolk, was an English politician.

He was a Member of Parliament (MP) for Ipswich in 1586.
