= Agnes Ibbetson =

British physiologist (1757–1823)

Agnes (née Thomson) Ibbetson (1757–1823) was an English plant physiologist.

== Life ==
She was the daughter of Andrew Thomson Esq., of Roehampton, a London merchant, and was born in London in 1757 and educated at home. In 1783 she married James Ibbetson at Bushey in Hertfordshire. He was the eldest son the Rev. James Ibbetson, rector of Bushey and Archdeacon of St. Albans. James, junior, was a barrister and amateur antiquary who had been admitted to Lincoln's Inn in 1771, but he died in 1790 aged 35 leaving Agnes a widow. Sometime after James's death she moved to Devon where she lived for the rest of her life. She died on 9 February 1823 in Exmouth, aged 66. Her nephew was Charles Poulett Thomson, who was a politician and become the first Governor of Canada, being raised to the peerage as Baron Syndenham. Ibbetson was left with an annuity and comfortable financial circumstances.

=== Work ===
Though isolated from the contemporary scientific community, Ibbetson began publishing her plant physiology in her fifties, and approached her work with an observational and experimental bent. Ibbetson made extensive use of microscopes, plant dissection, and other technology to pursue her studies, and believed that plant functions had mechanical explanations. Between 1809 and 1822 Mrs. Ibbetson contributed more than fifty papers to Nicholson's Journal and the Philosophical Magazine on the microscopic structure and physiology of plants, including such subjects as air-vessels, pollen, perspiration, sleep, winter-buds, grafting, impregnation, germination, and the Jussieuean method. In the botanical department of the British Museum are preserved some specimens of woods and microscopic slides prepared by her, with a manuscript description stating that they represent twenty-four years' work, and illustrating her erroneous belief that buds originate endogenously and force their way outward.

== Legacy ==
The leguminous genus Ibbetsonia was dedicated to her by John Sims, but is now considered identical with the Cyclopia of Ventenat.
