= Bamber Gascoyne (the elder) =

18th-century English politician

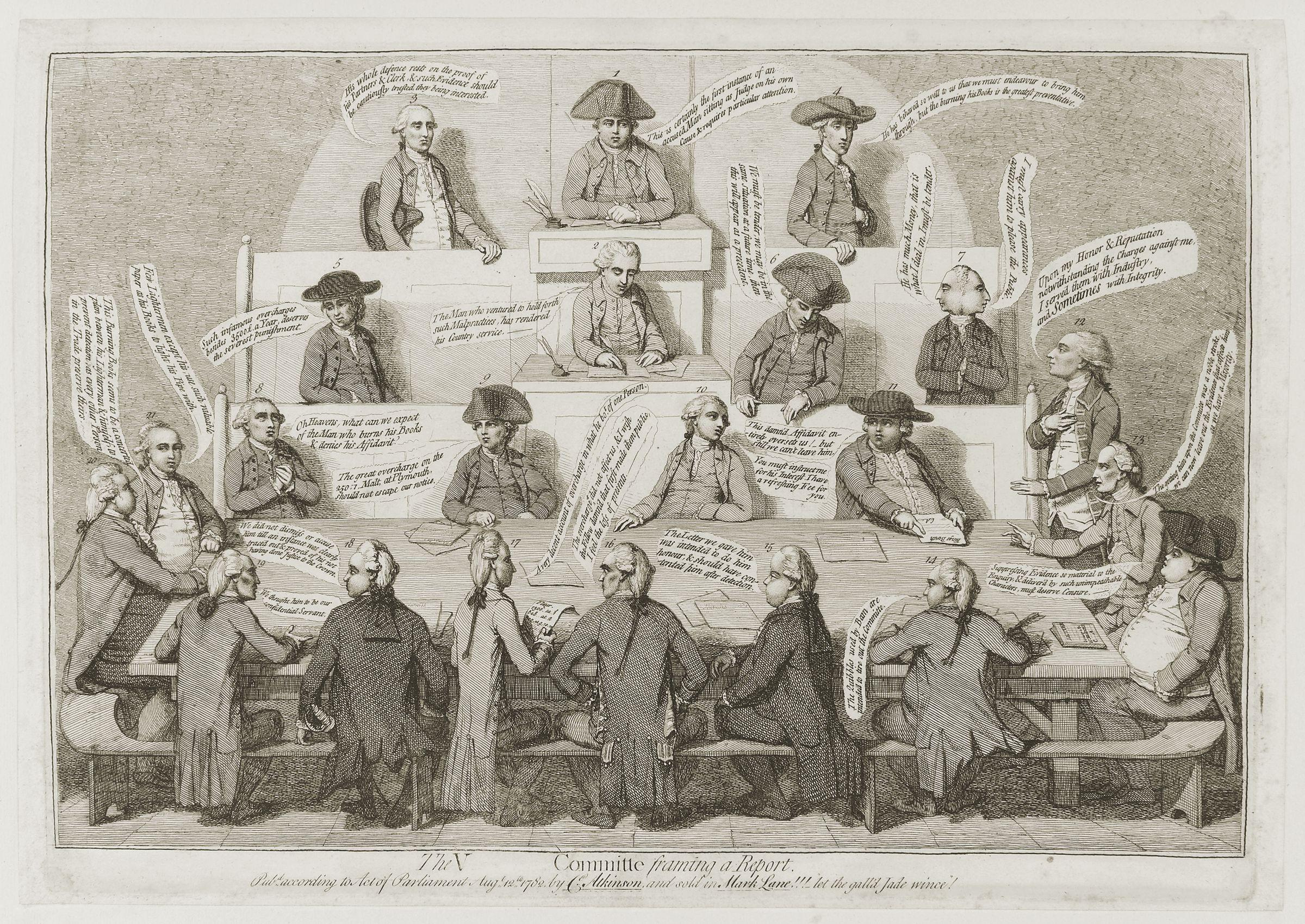
Bamber Gascoyne (1725–1791) was a Lord of the Admiralty and is represented in this cartoon as the two-faced man on the right.

Bamber Gascoyne of Childwall Hall, Lancashire (1725–1791), was an 18th-century English politician who sat in the House of Commons of Great Britain between 1761 and 1786.

Gascoyne was the son of Sir Crisp Gascoyne and Margaret Bamber. After his education at Felsted School, he matriculated at Queen's College, Oxford, in 1743.

Gascoyne served as member of Parliament for several constituencies including Maldon (1761–1763), Midhurst (1765–1768), and Truro (1774–1784). From 1779 to 1782 he was a Lord Commissioner of the Admiralty in the administration of Lord North.

He married Mary Green, daughter of Isaac Green, a Lancashire lawyer, and his wife Mary Aspinwall. He was the father of Bamber Gascoyne (junior) and Isaac Gascoyne, and an ancestor of TV quizmaster Bamber Gascoigne. He was a great-grandfather of Frederick Gascoyne.

Parliament of Great Britain
Preceded by John Bullock; Robert Colebrooke	Member of Parliament for Maldon; 1761–1763; With: John Bullock	Succeeded by John Bullock; John Huske
Preceded by William Hamilton; John Burgoyne	Member of Parliament for Midhurst; 1765–1768; With: John Burgoyne	Succeeded by Lord Stavordale; Hon. Charles James Fox
Preceded by Simon Luttrell; Hon. Henry Thynne	Member of Parliament for Weobley; 1770–1774; With: Simon Luttrell	Succeeded by Sir William Lynch; John St Leger Douglas
Preceded by Edward Hugh Boscawen; Hon. George Boscawen	Member of Parliament for Truro; 1774–1784; With: George Boscawen 1774–1780; Henry Rosewarne 1780–1783; John Pollexfen Bastard 1783–1784; Sir John St Aubyn, Bt Feb–Apr 1784	Succeeded by William Macarmick; William Augustus Spencer Boscawen
Preceded by Hon. Charles Stuart; Hon. Henry Luttrell	Member of Parliament for Bossiney; 1784–1786; With: Hon. Charles Stuart	Succeeded by Hon. Charles Stuart; Matthew Montagu
