= George Boscawen (British Army general) =

British Army general

Lieutenant-General George Boscawen (1 December 1712 – 3 May 1775) was a British Army officer and politician, the fourth son of Hugh Boscawen, 1st Viscount Falmouth.

Believed to have been educated at Eton College, he was commissioned as an ensign in the First Foot Guards in 1728, and promoted to captain in 1738. He saw active service during the War of the Austrian Succession, distinguishing himself at the battles of Fontenoy and Dettingen.

On 3 February 1743, he was married to Ann Trevor, the daughter of John Morley Trevor. The couple would go on to have two sons, politician George Boscawen and author William Boscawen; and two daughters. Shortly after his marriage, on 22 February, he was elected as Member of Parliament for Penryn, following the decision of Edward Vernon (who had been simultaneously elected for three different constituencies) to take up his seat at Ipswich. He was promoted to the rank of colonel on 18 August 1749, and appointed as Aide-de-camp to King George II on 14 October the same year. In 1750 he was made Lieutenant-Governor of the Scilly Isles, a post he would occupy until his death.

On 4 March 1752 he was named colonel of the 29th Regiment of Foot and led that regiment during a lengthy posting to Ireland. He was promoted to the rank of major general on 14 January 1758, and to lieutenant general on 22 February 1760. On 16 January 1761, he was transferred to become colonel of the 23rd Regiment of Foot.

In the general election of 1761, he stood down at Penryn and was elected, on 1 April 1761, to represent Truro instead. This constituency was controlled by his brother, Lord Falmouth, and generally returned members of the Boscawen family. Boscawen would sit for Truro until the election of 1774, when he would leave parliament to be replaced by his son George. During his 31-year parliamentary career, he only once voted against the government of the day – voting against the Cider Act in 1764 – and waited until 1770 to make his only recorded contribution to a debate.

Boscawen died in York Street, St James's, London, in 1775.

Military offices
Preceded by Hon. John Huske	Colonel of the 23rd Regiment of Foot; 1761–1775	Succeeded by William Howe, 5th Viscount Howe
Preceded by Peregrine Thomas Hopson	Colonel of the 29th Regiment of Foot; 1752–1761	Succeeded by Hon. George Forbes, 4th Earl of Granard
Parliament of Great Britain
Preceded by John Evelyn; Edward Vernon	Member of Parliament for Penrhyn; 1743–1761; With: John Evelyn 1743–1747; Henry Seymour Conway 1747–1754; Richard Edgcumbe 1754–1758; John Plumptre 1758–1761	Succeeded by Sir Edward Turner; George Brydges Rodney
Preceded by Edward Boscawen; John Boscawen	Member of Parliament for Truro; 1761–1774; With: John Boscawen 1761–1767; Edward Hugh Boscawen 1767–1774	Succeeded by George Boscawen; Bamber Gascoyne
