= Henry Rawlinson (MP) =

Henry Rawlinson (1743–1786) was Member of the Parliament of Great Britain for Liverpool from 1780 to 1784.

He was born on 8 April 1743, son of Abraham Rawlinson and Ellen Godsalve, and died 28 January 1786. Henry Rawlinson was a slave trader and owned property in the West Indies. The Rawlinson family traded out of the port of Lancaster, as well as having interests in Liverpool. He is referred to in records as "of Grassyard Hall, Caton", which was the family estate near Lancaster.

His father was uncle to Abraham Rawlinson (1738–1803), MP for Lancaster, and these two first cousins were sometimes confused in records of parliament.

Parliament of Great Britain
Preceded by Sir William Meredith; Richard Pennant	Member of Parliament for Liverpool; 1780–1784; With: Bamber Gascoyne	Succeeded by Bamber Gascoyne; Richard Pennant
