= Anne Hoo =

Great grandmother to Anne Boleyn, Queen of England

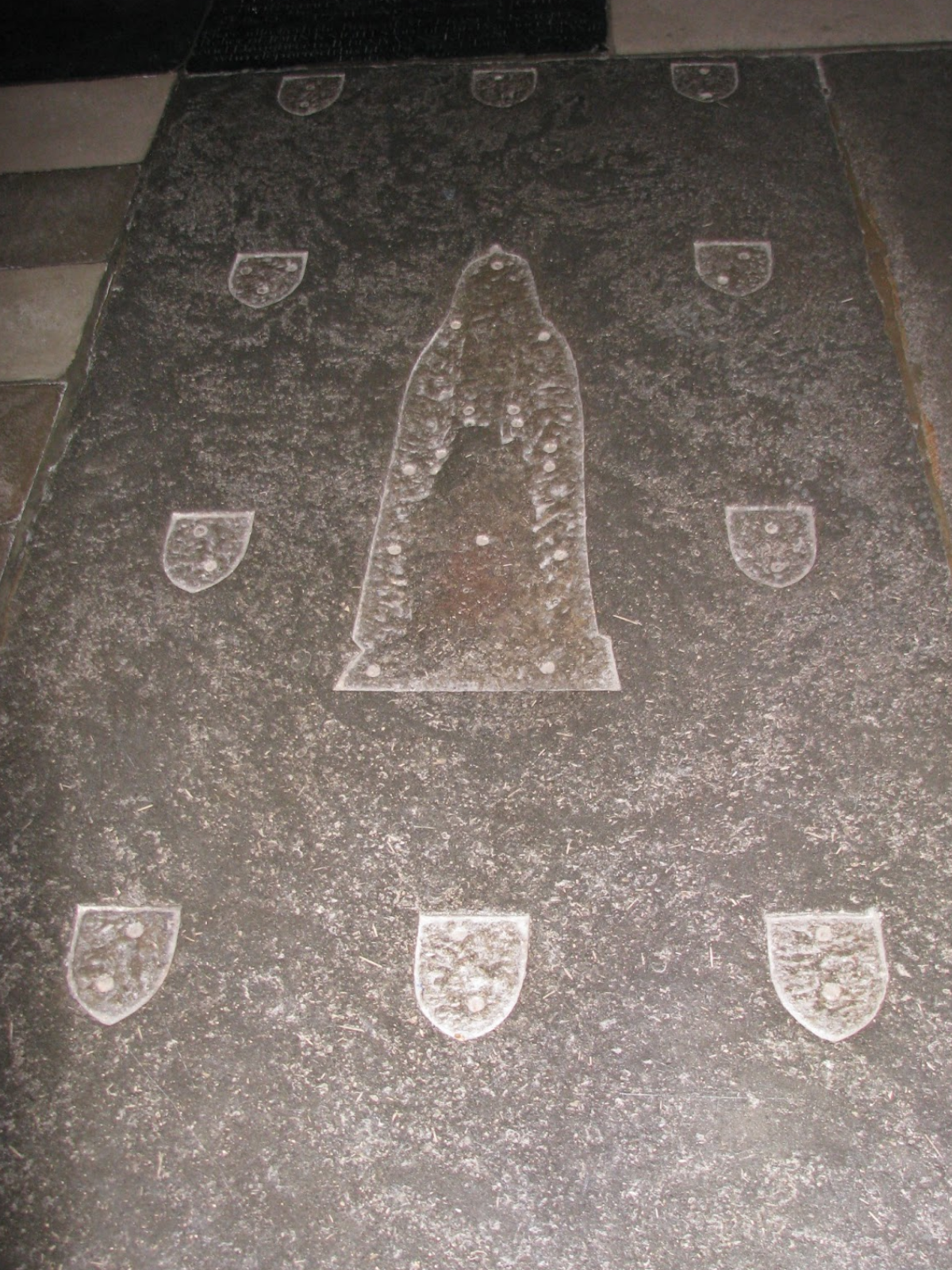
- Anne's grave. The monumental brass fixtures were lost in the 16th century.
- Born: c.1424
- Died: 6 June 1484–85
- Buried: Norwich Cathedral, Norwich, Norfolk
- Noble family: Hoo (by birth); Boleyn (by marriage)
- Spouse: Sir Geoffrey Boleyn (m. 1445; d. 1463)
- Issue: Thomas Boleyn; Sir William Boleyn; Isabel Boleyn; Alice Boleyn; Anne Boleyn
- Father: Thomas Hoo, Baron Hoo and Hastings
- Mother: Elizabeth Wychingham

Lady Anne Boleyn (née Hoo; c. 1424 – 6 June 1485) was an English noblewoman, noted for being the great grandmother of Anne Boleyn and therefore the maternal great-great grandmother of Elizabeth I of England. She was the only child of Thomas Hoo, Baron Hoo and Hastings, and his first wife Elizabeth Wychingham. She married Sir Geoffrey Boleyn in c.1445.

== Early life and family ==
Anne was born c.1424 into the Hoo family, was the only child and co-heiress to Thomas Hoo, Baron Hoo and Hastings, and his first wife, Elizabeth Wychingham. Her father was created Baron of Hoo and Hastings in 1445 which brought more importance to her family.

She was the only child to her father's first marriage. However, she later had three half sisters from her father's second marriage to Eleanor Welles, the daughter of Lionel de Welles, 6th Baron Welles, and his first wife, Joan Waterton. Her half sisters were:

- Anne Hoo the younger (born c.1447), married
  - (1) Roger Copley, Esquire (died 1482/1488), Citizen and mercer of London, of Roughey (Roffey) in Horsham, Sussex, by whom she had issue.
  - (2) William Greystoke, Gentleman (living 1498), of London and St. Olave, Southwark, Surrey, They had no issue.
  - ?(3) Sir Thomas Fiennes. Had no issue.
- Eleanor Hoo, who married
  - (1) Thomas Echingham, son and heir of Sir Thomas Echingham. Had no issue.
  - (2) Sir James Carew of Beddington, Surrey. Had one son, Richard.
- Elizabeth Hoo, who married
  - (1) Thomas Massingberd, citizen and Mercer of London, and
  - (2) Sir John Devenish of Horselunges manor, Hellingly.

it is uncertain if Elizabeth had children from her marriages.

== Marriage and issue ==
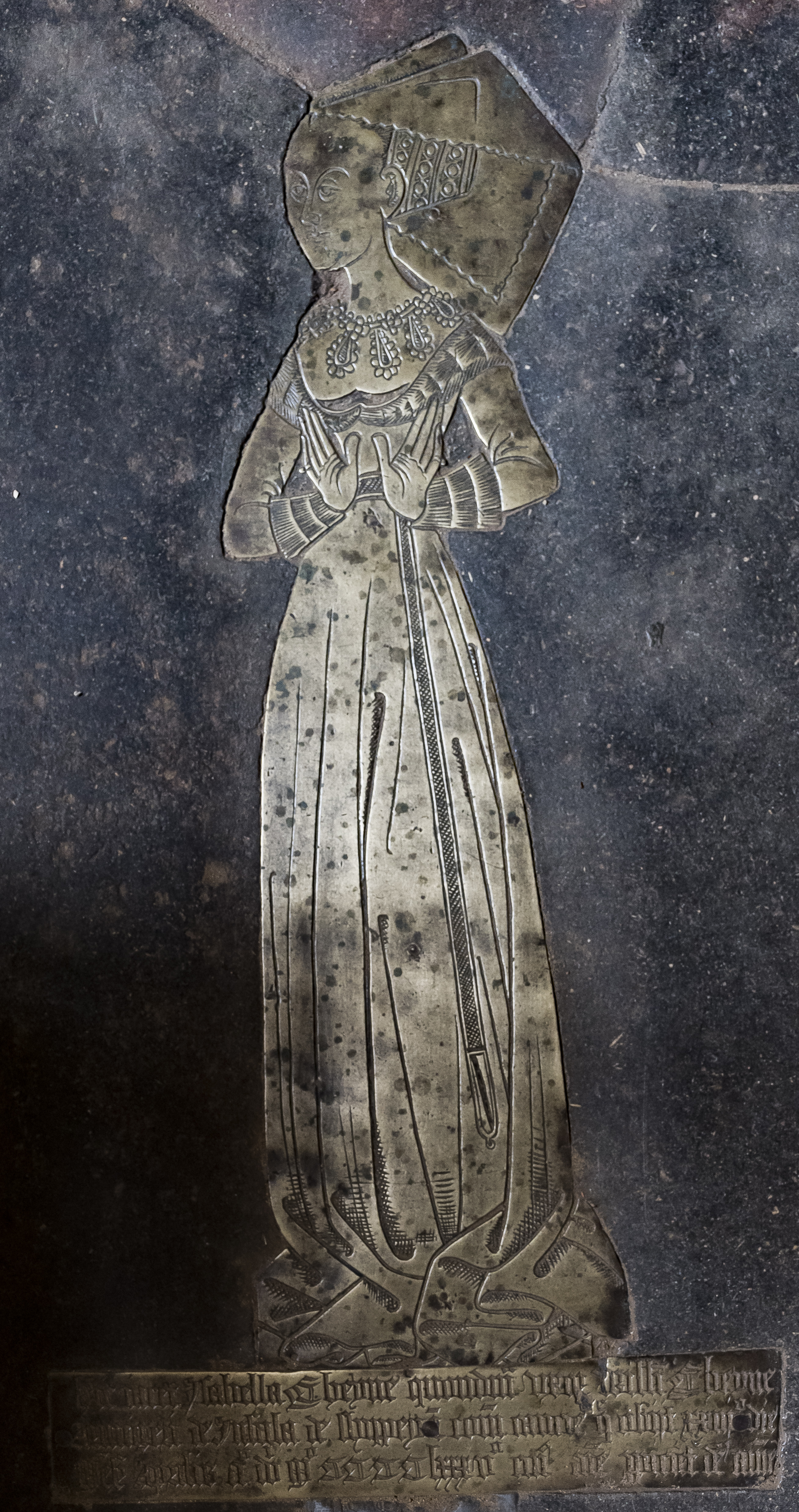
Monumental brass of Isabel Cheyney (d.1485), eldest daughter of Anne, Blickling Church

She married in c.1445 in Salle, Norfolk to Sir Geoffrey Boleyn, mercer and Lord Mayor of London: (1406–1463). He was the son of an elder Geoffrey Boleyn (died 1440) and his wife Alice, née Bracton. The marriage produced five known children:

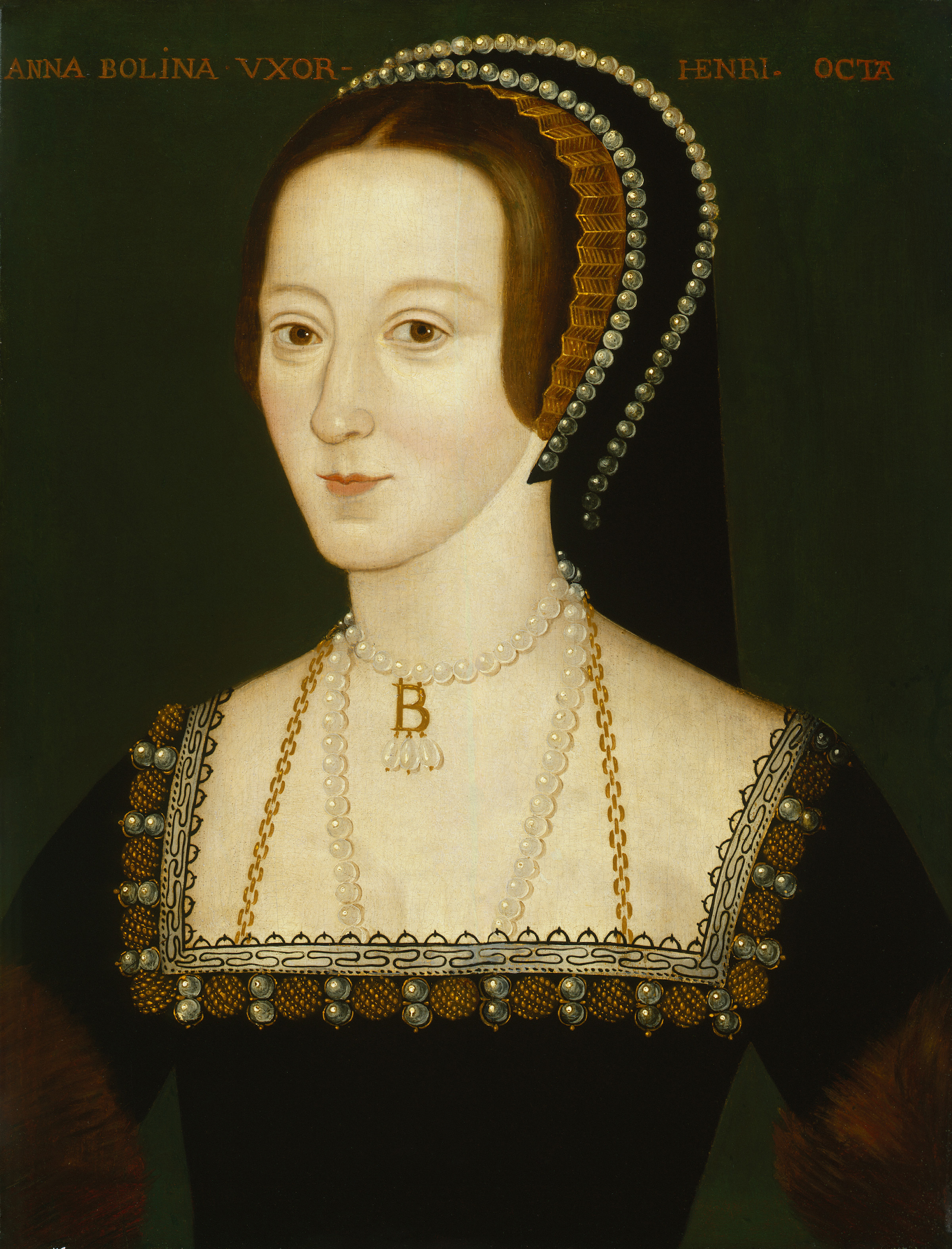
Anne's great granddaughter, Anne Boleyn

- Thomas Boleyn (died 30 April 1471), of the City of London. Never married. Buried in the Church of St Lawrence Old Jewry, beside his father.
- Sir William Boleyn (1451–1505), married Lady Margaret Butler, daughter and co-heiress of Thomas Butler, 7th Earl of Ormond, by whom he had issue including Thomas Boleyn, 1st Earl of Wiltshire and was therefore the grandfather to Anne Boleyn, second wife of Henry VIII, King of England.
- Isabel Boleyn (died 1485), married William Cheyney (1444–1487) and had no issue.
- Alice Boleyn (died c.1480), married Sir John Fortescue (d.1500) of Ponsborne Park Newgate Street, Hertfordshire and had issue.
- Anne Boleyn (died May 1510), married Sir Henry Heydon (1425–1504) of Baconsthorpe, Norfolk and had issue.

She became a widow in 1463 after the death of her husband and never remarried.

== Death and burial ==
Anne died on 6 June 1484 or 1485 aged about 61. She was laid to rest in Norwich Cathedral, Norwich, Norfolk in which her son William Boleyn was later buried beside her as he had requested. Her resting place was later moved during the 16th century, however her monumental brass fixtures were lost in the process.

== Ancestry ==
Ancestors of Anne Hoo

8. Sir William Hoo (1335–1410)
4. Sir Thomas Hoo (c. 1370–1420) of Luton Hoo in Bedfordshire
9. Alice de St Omer
2. Thomas Hoo, Baron Hoo and Hastings
10. Thomas de Felton
5. Eleanor de Felton (c. 1361–1400)
11.Joan Walkfare
1. Anne Hoo
12. William Wychingham
6. Nicholas Wychingham
13. Margaret de Woodrising
3. Elizabeth Wychingham
14. Bartholomew Antingham
7. Joan Antingham

== Sources ==
- The Boleyn Women, a book by Elizabeth Norton (2013)
