= George Boscawen (MP for St Mawes) =

English politician

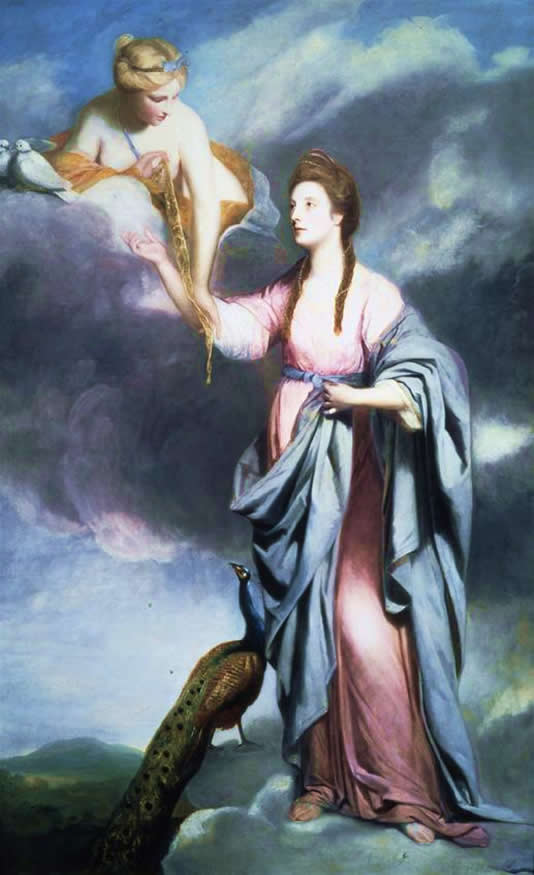
Annabella, Lady Blake, as Juno Receiving the Cestus from Venus by Joshua Reynolds, c.1769.

George Boscawen (4 September 1745 – 14 October 1833) was an English politician who sat in the House of Commons from 1768 to 1780.

Boscawen was the son of Lieutenant-General Hon. George Boscawen and grandson of Hugh Boscawen, 1st Viscount Falmouth. His younger brother was the author William Boscawen. He attended Eton College from 1754 to 1761.

In 1768 he was elected to Parliament for St Mawes, and in 1774 for Truro. In the latter year he was commissioned an ensign in the 4th Regiment of Foot.

In May 1776, he quit England to France with Annabella Bunbury, former wife of Sir Patrick Blake, 1st Baronet, and daughter of Sir William Bunbury, 5th Baronet. They remained abroad until 1779, when they married in Chislehurst, Kent.

Boscawen did not stand in the general election of 1780.

He died in Teignmouth, Devonshire, aged 88.

Parliament of Great Britain
Preceded by Edmund Nugent; Richard Hussey	Member of Parliament for St Mawes; 1768–1774; With: Edmund Nugent 1768–1770; Michael Byrne 1770–1772; James Edward Colleton 1772–1774	Succeeded by Viscount Clare; Hugh Boscawen
Preceded by Edward Hugh Boscawen; Lt.Gen. Hon. George Boscawen	Member of Parliament for Truro; 1774–1780; With: Bamber Gascoyne	Succeeded by Henry Rosewarne; Bamber Gascoyne
