= Bamber Gascoyne (the younger) =

British politician

Bamber Gascoyne of Childwall Hall, Lancashire (1758 – 17 January 1824), was a British politician. He was an ancestor of two British Prime Ministers, Robert Gascoyne-Cecil, 3rd Marquess of Salisbury, and Arthur Balfour.

He was the son of Bamber Gascoyne (senior) and Mary Green.

He was Member of Parliament for Liverpool from 1780 to 1796. He was succeeded as MP for Liverpool by his brother Isaac.

He spoke in Parliament against the abolition of the slave trade, and led the opposition to the Sierra Leone settlement bill, which successfully incorporated the Sierra Leone Company in 1791.

He was married to Sarah Bridget Frances Price, born in 1767, daughter of Chase Price and Susan Glanvile. Their daughter Frances Mary Gascoyne (c. 1806 – 15 October 1839) married, on 2 February 1821, James Gascoyne-Cecil, 2nd Marquess of Salisbury. They became the parents of Prime Minister Robert Gascoyne-Cecil, 3rd Marquess of Salisbury, and the grandparents of Prime Minister Arthur Balfour.

Parliament of Great Britain
Preceded by Sir William Meredith, 3rd Bt; Richard Pennant	Member of Parliament for Liverpool; 1780–1796; With: Henry Rawlinson 1780–1784; Richard Pennant 1784–1790; Banastre Tarleton 1790–1796	Succeeded by Isaac Gascoyne; Banastre Tarleton
