= Mary Lassells =

English gentlewoman

Mary Hall (née Lassells or Lascelles) was an English gentlewoman whose report of the 'light' behaviour in her youth of Henry VIII's fifth Queen, Katherine Howard, initiated the process which ended with Queen Katherine's execution.

== Life ==
Mary Lassells was the daughter of Richard, or George, Lassells of Gateford, Nottinghamshire (d. 1520), gentleman. She was in the household of Agnes Tilney, the Dowager Duchess of Norfolk at Lambeth while Katherine Howard, later the fifth wife of King Henry VIII, was a young girl there under the lax guardianship of the Duchess, her step-grandmother.

After Katherine became Queen, Mary's brother, the religious reformer John Lassells, suggested that his sister seek a place in her household. Mary refused, giving as a reason Katherine's former 'light' behaviour. John Lassells informed Archbishop Thomas Cranmer of Mary's comment while King Henry and Queen Katherine were on progress in the fall of 1541. Cranmer questioned Mary, who provided details of the Queen's earlier sexual indiscretions with her music master, Henry Manox, and a Howard kinsman, Francis Dereham, in the Dowager Duchess's household. On 1 November 1541 Cranmer revealed these indiscretions in a letter to the King, who immediately ordered that Queen Katherine be confined to her apartments, and never saw her again. The Dowager Duchess, hearing reports of what had happened while Katherine had been in her charge, reasoned that 'If there be none offence sithence the marriage, she cannot die for that was done before'. Unfortunately for the Queen and the Dowager Duchess, further investigations by Cranmer and the Council revealed that with the connivance of one of her attendants, Lady Rochford, Katherine had allegedly had an affair with Thomas Culpeper, one of the King's favourite gentlemen of the privy chamber, after her marriage to the King.

Dereham, Manox and other members of the Dowager Duchess's household were arrested and interrogated by the council. On 22 December 1541 the Dowager Duchess's eldest son, William Howard, his wife, and a number of servants who had been witnesses to the Queen's misconduct were arraigned for misprision of treason 'for concealing the evil demeanour of the Queen, to the slander of the King and his succession'. All were sentenced to life imprisonment and loss of goods, although most were pardoned after Queen Katherine's execution. The Dowager Duchess, although included in the indictment, was not brought to trial as she was 'old and testy', and 'may die out of perversity to defraud the King's Highness of the confiscation of her goods', but like the others she was sentenced to imprisonment and forfeiture of lands and goods. On 6 February 1542 a bill of attainder against Queen Katherine and Lady Rochford received final reading, and on 13 February 1542 the Queen and Lady Rochford were beheaded on Tower Green. The King was of the view that there was as much reason to convict the Dowager Duchess of treason as there had been to convict Dereham. However the Council urged leniency, and she was eventually released from the Tower on 5 May 1542.

Mary Lassells married a Mr. Hall of Lambeth.

Her brother was later executed.

== Appearances ==
In Literature

- The Rose Without a Thorn by Jean Plaidy
- Murder Most Royal by Jean Plaidy

In Film

- Henry VIII (TV serial); portrayed by Catrin Rhys
