= Wives of Henry VIII =

Queens consort of Henry VIII of England

Six wives of Henry VIII
and years of marriage

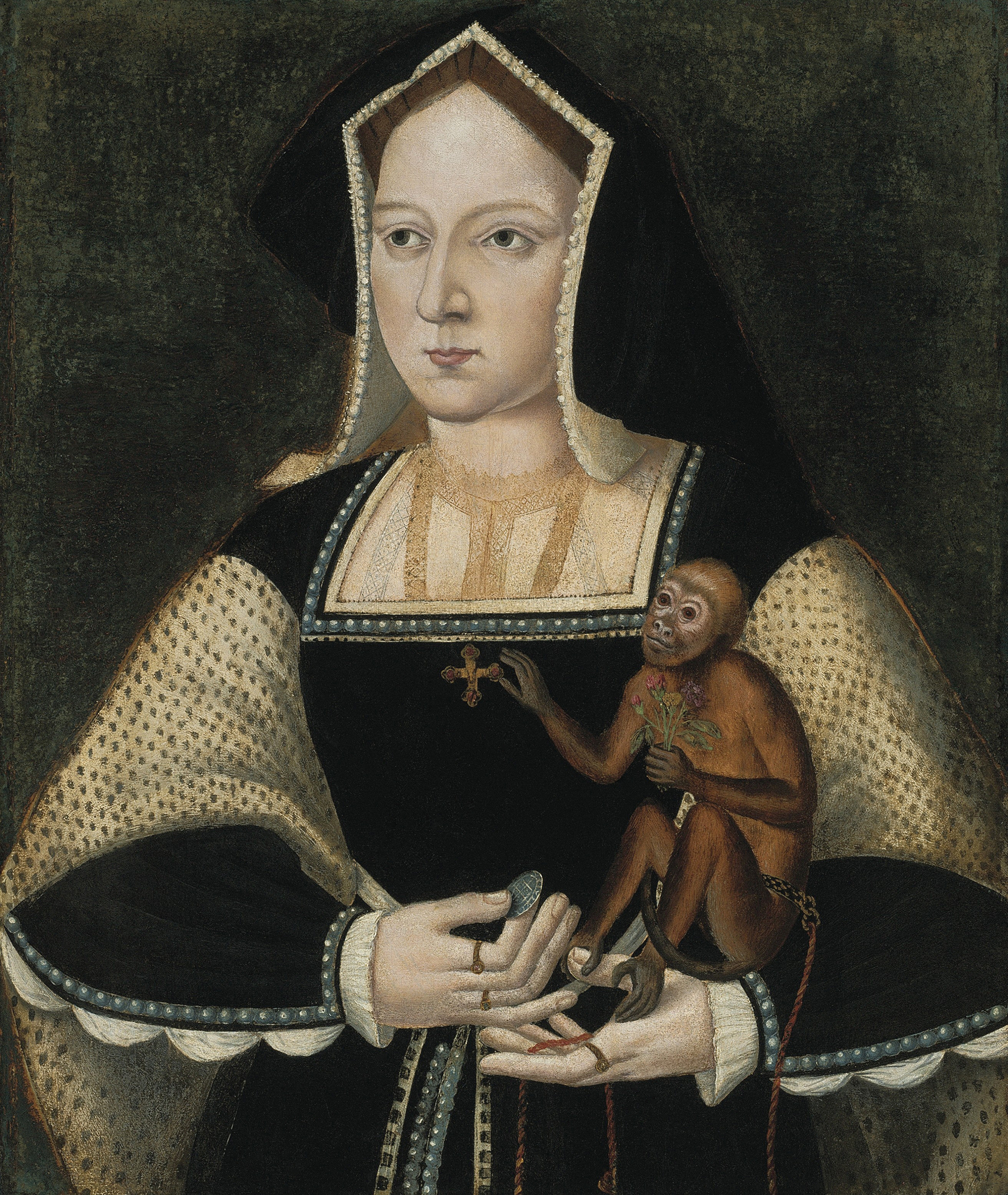
Catherine of Aragon
m. 1509–1533

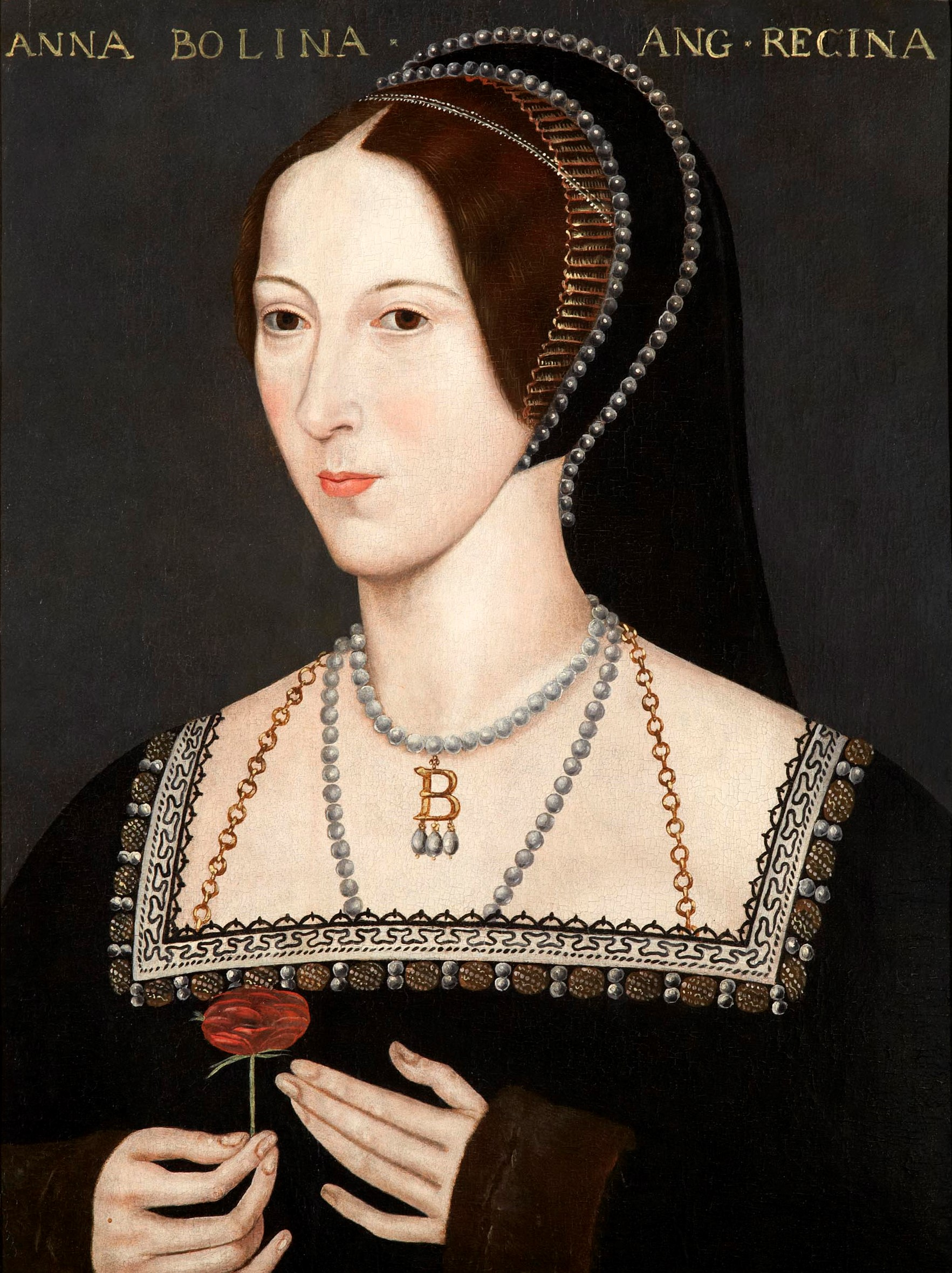
Anne Boleyn
m. 1532/1533–1536

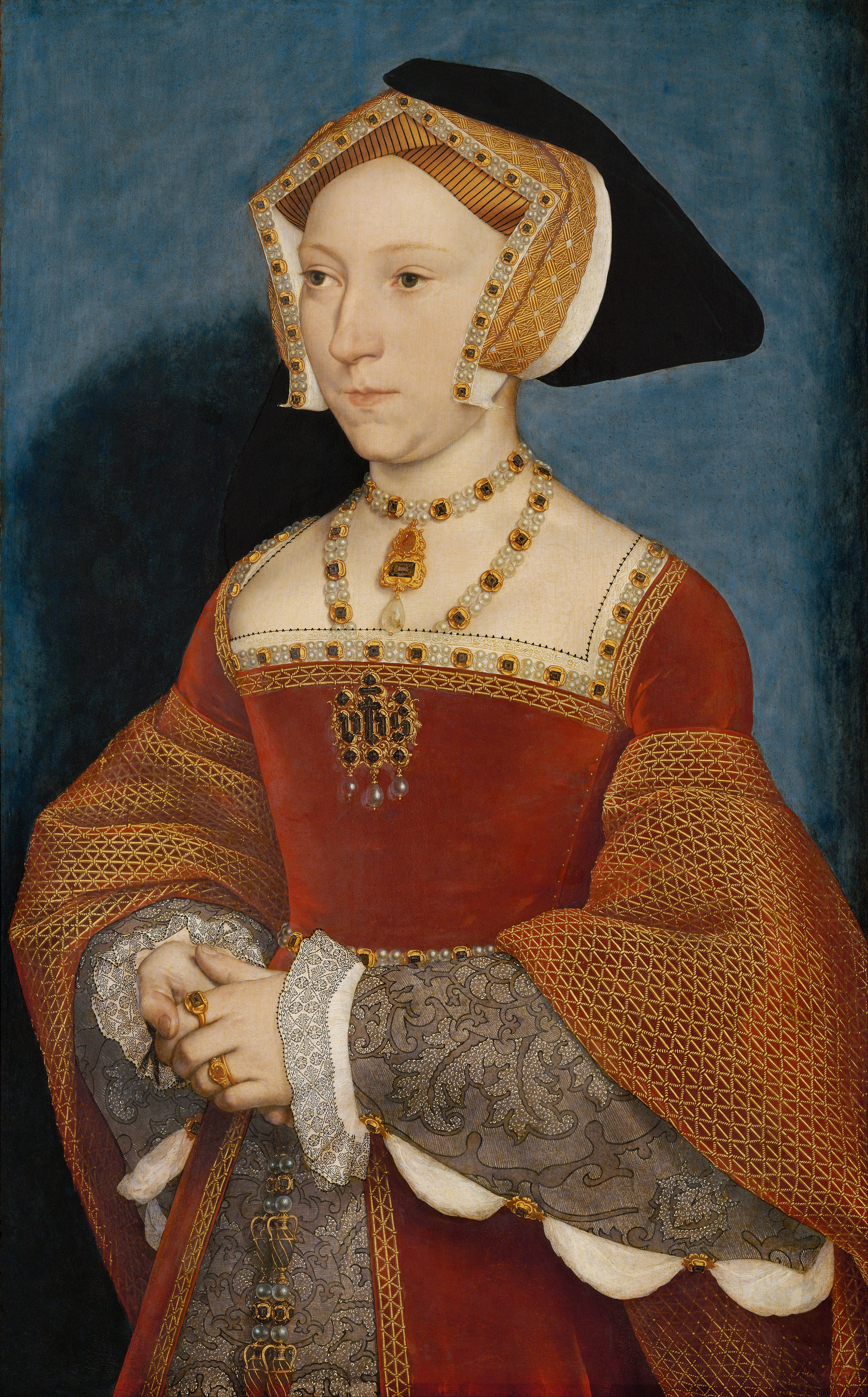
Jane Seymour
m. 1536–1537

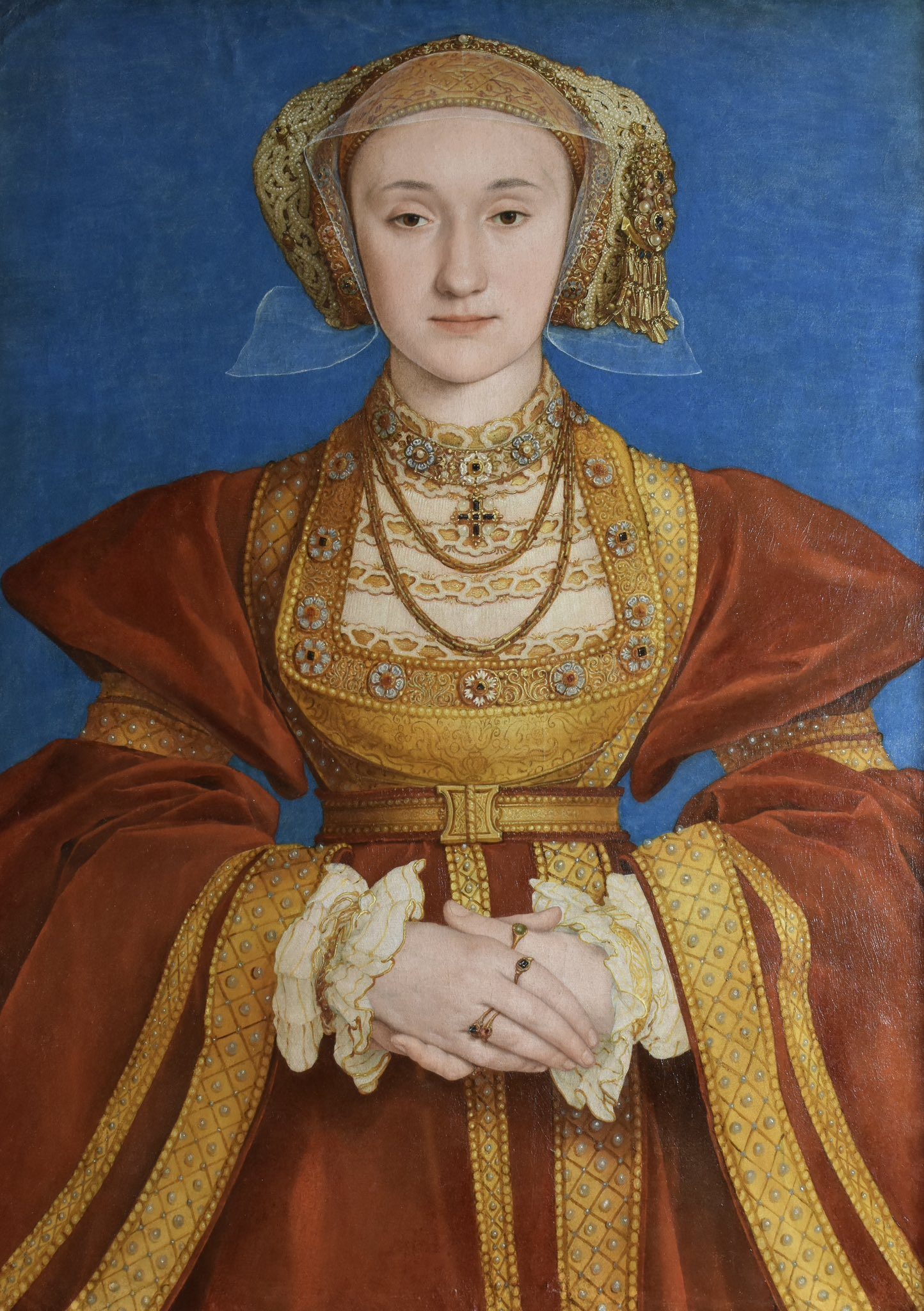
Anne of Cleves
m. 1540

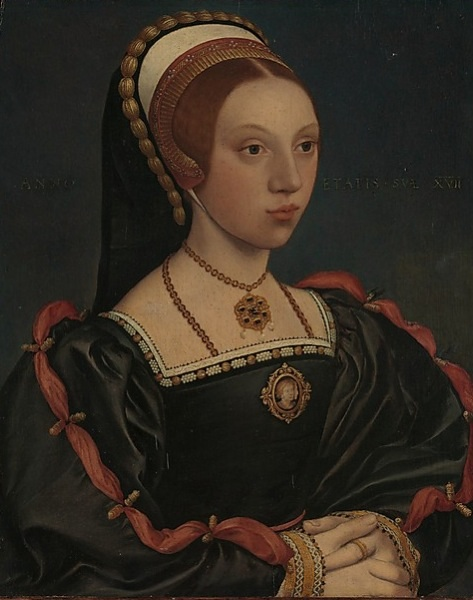
Catherine Howard
m. 1540–1542

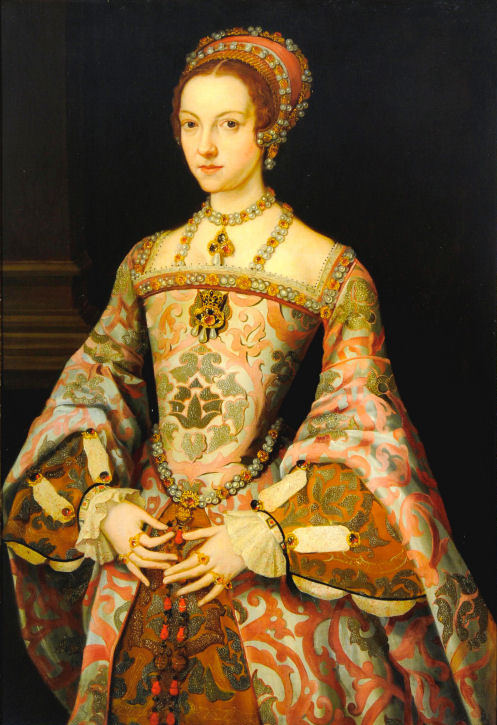
Catherine Parr
m. 1543–1547

King Henry VIII of England had six wives between 1509 and his death in 1547. In legal terms (de jure), Henry had only three wives and no divorces during his life. Instead, three of his marriages were annulled by the Church of England, declaring that a true marriage never took place (unlike a divorce, in which a married couple end their union). Henry VIII was granted an annulment by the church in England, instead of one by the Pope, as he desired, for his marriage to Catherine of Aragon, his first wife, substantially leading to the English Reformation. This legal action was later revoked during the reign of their daughter Mary I. Along with his six wives, Henry took several mistresses.

== Overview ==
The six women who were married to Henry VIII, in chronological order of their marriages, were:

No.	Name	Lifespan	Marriage dates and length	Fate of marriage	Issue and fate
1	Catherine of Aragon	16 December 1485 – 7 January 1536	11 June 1509 – 23 May 1533 (23 years, 11 months and 12 days)	Annulled (annulment posthumously reversed)	Mother of Queen Mary I. Died 7 January 1536.
2	Anne Boleyn	c. 1501 or 1507 – 19 May 1536	14 November 1532 (1st wedding)/ 25 January 1533 (2nd wedding) – 17 May 1536 (3 years, 6 months and 3 days/3 years, 3 months and 22 days)	Annulled 2 days prior to Boleyn's execution	Mother of Queen Elizabeth I. Beheaded 19 May 1536 at the Tower of London.
3	Jane Seymour	c. 1508 – 24 October 1537	30 May 1536 – 24 October 1537 (1 year, 4 months and 24 days)	Ended with Seymour's death	Mother of King Edward VI. Died 24 October 1537, due to complications (childbed fever) twelve days after giving birth.
4	Anne of Cleves	28 June or 22 September 1515 – 16 July 1557	6 January 1540 – 12 July 1540 (6 months and 6 days)	Annulled	No children. Did not remarry. Outlived Henry and the other wives. Died 16 July 1557.
5	Catherine Howard	c. 1523 – 13 February 1542	28 July 1540 – 13 February 1542 (1 year, 6 months and 16 days)	Ended with Howard's execution	No children. Beheaded 13 February 1542 at the Tower of London.
6	Catherine Parr	c. July/August 1512 – 5 September 1548	12 July 1543 – 28 January 1547 (3 years, 6 months and 16 days)	Ended with Henry's death	No children. Widowed by Henry VIII. Remarried to Thomas Seymour (brother of Jane Seymour, third wife of Henry VIII); Died 5 September 1548.

Henry's first marriage to Catherine of Aragon lasted nearly 24 years, while the following five lasted just over 10 years combined.

=== Details ===
English historian and House of Tudor expert David Starkey describes Henry VIII as a husband:

What is extraordinary is that in the beginning of Henry's marriages, he was usually a very good husband. He was very tender to them, research shows that he addressed some of his wives as "sweetheart". He was a good lover, he was very generous: the wives were given huge settlements of land and jewels. He was immensely considerate when they were pregnant. However, if his current wife did not please him or did anything to fire his short temper, there would be consequences. Two of Henry's wives were beheaded by his command.

A mnemonic device to remember the order of Henry's consorts is "Arrogant Boys Seem Clever, Howard Particularly", indicating their "last names", as known to popular culture: Catherine of Aragon, Anne Boleyn, Jane Seymour, Anne of Cleves, Catherine Howard, Catherine Parr.

A rhyme for their fates is "Divorced, beheaded, died; Divorced, beheaded, survived". This is well known to British schoolchildren but oversimplifies the story.

The basis of the Catherine of Aragon annulment was a retcon of the previous narrative of her transition from Arthur to Henry; the basis of the Anne of Cleves annulment was non-consummation. While Catherine Parr outlived Henry and was widowed when he died during their marriage, long-since annulled Anne of Cleves also survived him and was the last of his wives to die.

Modern historians note that such rhymes reflect cultural memory rather than historical accuracy, since each generation has reinterpreted the wives as victims, saints, seductresses, or feminist icons depending on contemporary values.

=== Ancestry and relationships ===
Catherine of Aragon, Anne Boleyn, and Jane Seymour each gave Henry VIII one child who survived infancy: two daughters and one son, respectively. All three of these children eventually ascended to the throne, as King Edward VI, Queen Mary I, and Queen Elizabeth I. In addition, Henry had a relationship with Bessie Blount, resulting in a son – Henry FitzRoy.

Anne Boleyn and Catherine Howard, who were both beheaded due to accusations of infidelity, were first cousins. Jane Seymour was second cousin to both Boleyn and Howard. Several of Henry's wives worked in service to another wife, typically as a lady-in-waiting. Boleyn served Catherine of Aragon. Seymour served both of her predecessors, Aragon and Boleyn. Howard also served her predecessor, Anne of Cleves.

Henry VIII and his wives all descended from King Edward I ten generations earlier. See also the chart below.

== Catherine of Aragon ==
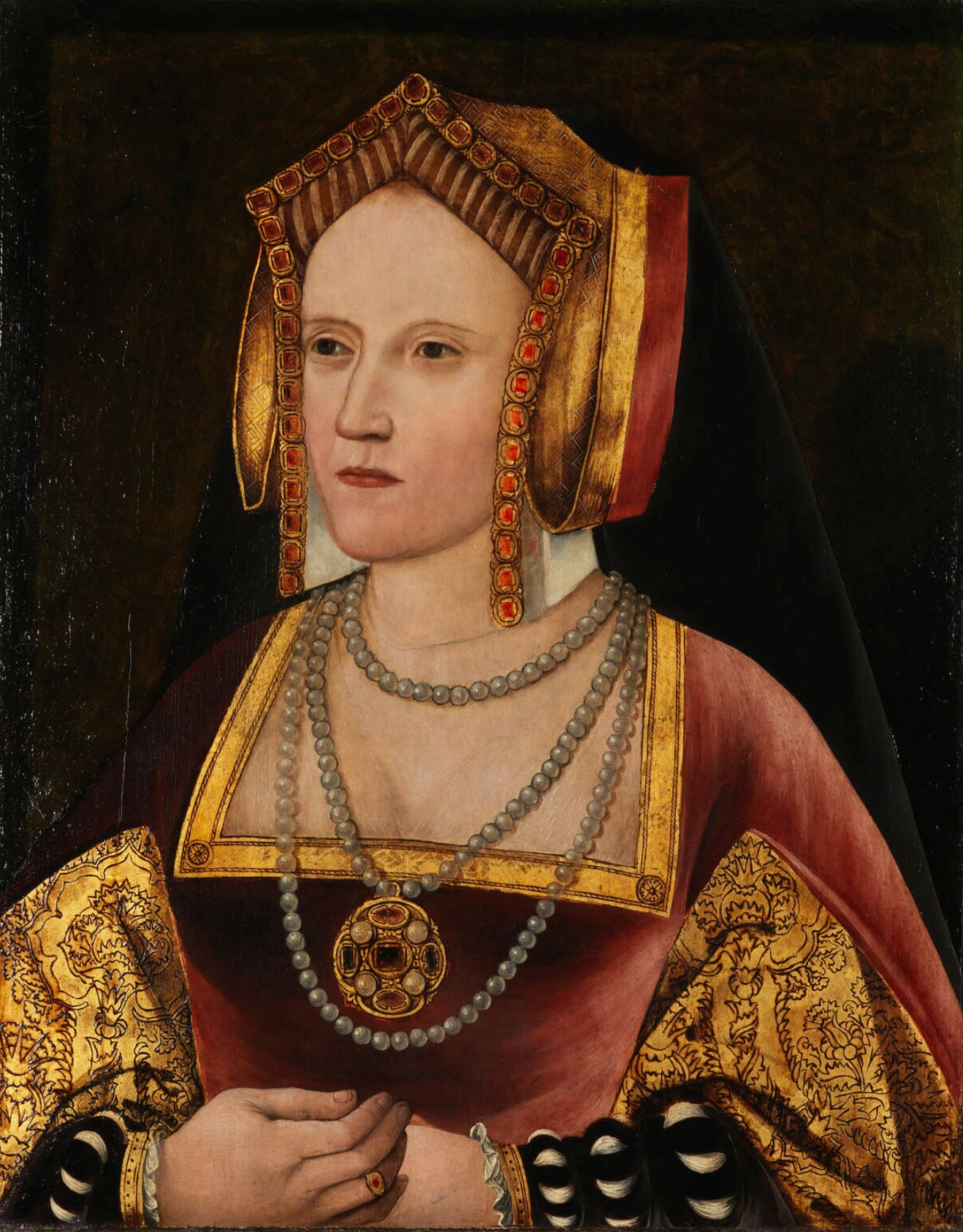
Catherine of Aragon

Catherine of Aragon (16 December 1485 – 7 January 1536; Spanish: Catalina de Aragón) was Henry's first wife. In modern sources, her name is most commonly spelled Catherine, although she spelled and signed her name with a "K", which was an accepted spelling in England at the time.

Catherine was originally married to Arthur, Henry's older brother. She was a year older than Arthur and six years older than Henry. After Arthur died of sweating sickness in 1502, a papal dispensation by Henry VII was obtained to enable her to marry Henry, though the marriage did not occur until he came to the throne in 1509, when Henry was 17 years old and Catherine was 23. Catherine became pregnant soon after, but the girl was stillborn. She became pregnant again in 1510 and gave birth to Henry, Duke of Cornwall in 1511, but he died almost two months later. She gave birth to a stillborn boy in 1513, and to another boy who died within hours in 1515. Finally, at age 30, she bore a healthy daughter, Mary, in 1516. After giving birth to Mary, Catherine is quoted as saying, "We are both young. If it was a daughter this time, by the Grace of God the sons will follow". She never had any sons that survived to adulthood. It was two years before she conceived again; the pregnancy ended with a short-lived girl.

It is said that Henry truly loved Catherine of Aragon, as he professed it many times. However, Henry became concerned he did not have a son to continue the Tudor dynasty.

Henry took several mistresses throughout this marriage, including Elizabeth Blount, with whom he fathered an illegitimate son, Henry FitzRoy. He also had an affair with Mary Boleyn – the daughter of Thomas Boleyn, English Ambassador to France. Later, Henry turned his attention to Mary's younger sister, Anne Boleyn, a lady-in-waiting to Catherine. Unlike her sister, Anne refused to become his mistress. Henry wrote many love letters to Anne, and quickly became infatuated with her. By the late 1520s, it was clear Catherine (now in her mid-40s) would not bear any more children, and Henry, increasingly desperate for a legitimate son, planned to marry Anne.

Henry, at the time a Roman Catholic, sought the Pope's approval for an annulment on the grounds that Catherine had first been his brother's wife. He used a passage from the Old Testament (Leviticus Chapter 20 Verse 21): "If a man shall take his brother's wife, it is an impurity; he hath uncovered his brother's nakedness; they shall be childless." Despite the Pope's refusal to annul the marriage, Henry separated from Catherine in 1531; Catherine was 45, Henry was 39. He ordered Thomas Cranmer, Archbishop of Canterbury, to convene a court. On 23 May 1533, Cranmer ruled the marriage to Catherine null and void. On 28 May 1533, he pronounced the King legally married to Anne (with whom Henry had already secretly exchanged wedding vows). This led to England breaking from the Roman Catholic Church and the establishment of the Church of England.

Shortly after marrying Anne Boleyn, Henry sent Catherine away. She did not see Henry, or their daughter Mary, again before her death in isolation at age 50.

Catherine was posthumously declared lawful wife of Henry – and thus rightful Queen consort – once again by parliament during the reign of Mary.

William Shakespeare, in the play Henry VIII, called Catherine "The queen of earthly queens" (2.4.138).

== Anne Boleyn ==
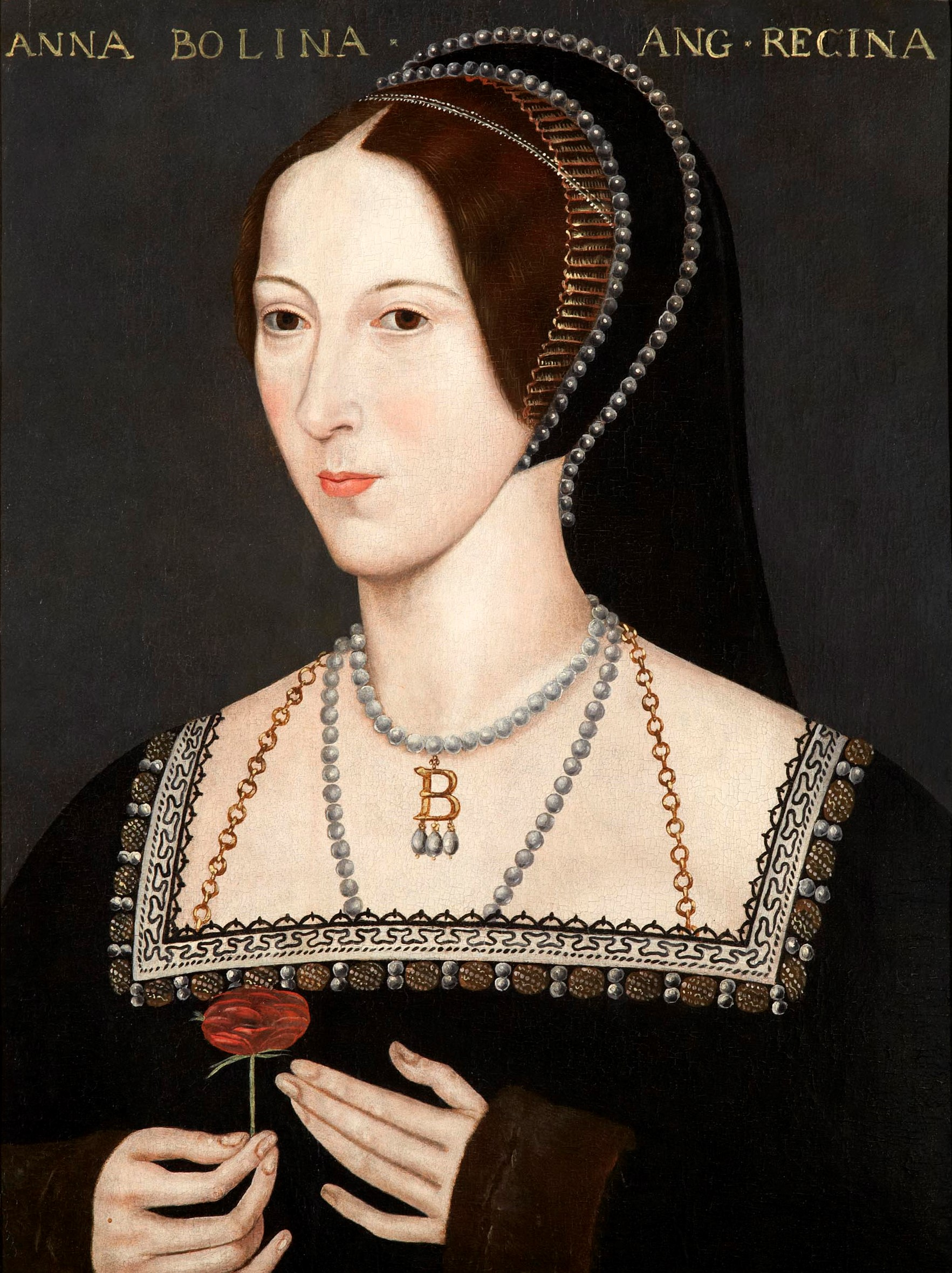
Anne Boleyn

Anne Boleyn (c. 1501 or 1507 – 19 May 1536) was Henry's second wife and the mother of Elizabeth I. Henry's marriage to Anne and her later execution made her a key figure in the political and religious upheaval at the start of the English Reformation. She was the daughter of Sir Thomas Boleyn and Elizabeth Howard, daughter of Thomas Howard, 2nd Duke of Norfolk. She was dark-haired with beautiful features and lively manners; she was educated in Europe by Margaret of Austria. She then moved to France, and lived there for some years, largely as a lady-in-waiting to Queen Claude.

Anne resisted the king's attempts of letters to seduce her and refused to become his mistress as her sister Mary Boleyn had been. It soon became the one absorbing object of the King's desires to secure an annulment from his wife Catherine of Aragon so that he could marry Anne. He wrote a love letter that provides evidence of some level of intimacy between them, in which he admires her "pretty duckies" (breasts). It eventually became clear that Pope Clement VII was unlikely to give the king an annulment, so Henry began to break the power of the Catholic Church in England for the current obsession he had with Anne Boleyn. This sparked the English Reformation.

Henry dismissed Cardinal Wolsey from public office and later had the Boleyn family's chaplain Thomas Cranmer appointed Archbishop of Canterbury. On 14 November 1532, Henry and Anne hosted a secret wedding service. Henry was 41, and Anne was in her mid 20s. She soon became pregnant and there was a second, official wedding service in London on 25 January 1533. On 23 May 1533, Cranmer declared the marriage of Henry and Catherine null and void. Five days later, Cranmer declared the marriage of Henry and Anne to be good and valid. Soon after, the Pope gave sentence of ex-communication against the King and the Archbishop. As a result of Anne's marriage to the King, the Church of England was forced to break with Rome and brought under the King's control. Anne was crowned Queen consort of England on 1 June 1533, and she gave birth to Henry's second daughter Elizabeth on 7 September. By 1536, she had suffered several miscarriages, and had failed to give birth to a son. Henry grew tired of Anne and waiting for a son; he looked around for another mistress while Thomas Cromwell, Anne's former ally, devised a plot to eliminate her.

Despite unconvincing evidence, she was found guilty of engaging in sexual relations with her brother, George Boleyn, and other men, and Anne was beheaded on 19 May 1536 for adultery, incest, and high treason after Henry had his marriage to her annulled just two days before. After the accession of her daughter, Elizabeth I, in 1558, Anne was venerated as a martyr and heroine of the English Reformation, particularly due to the works of John Foxe. Over the centuries, she has inspired or been mentioned in numerous artistic and cultural works.

== Jane Seymour ==
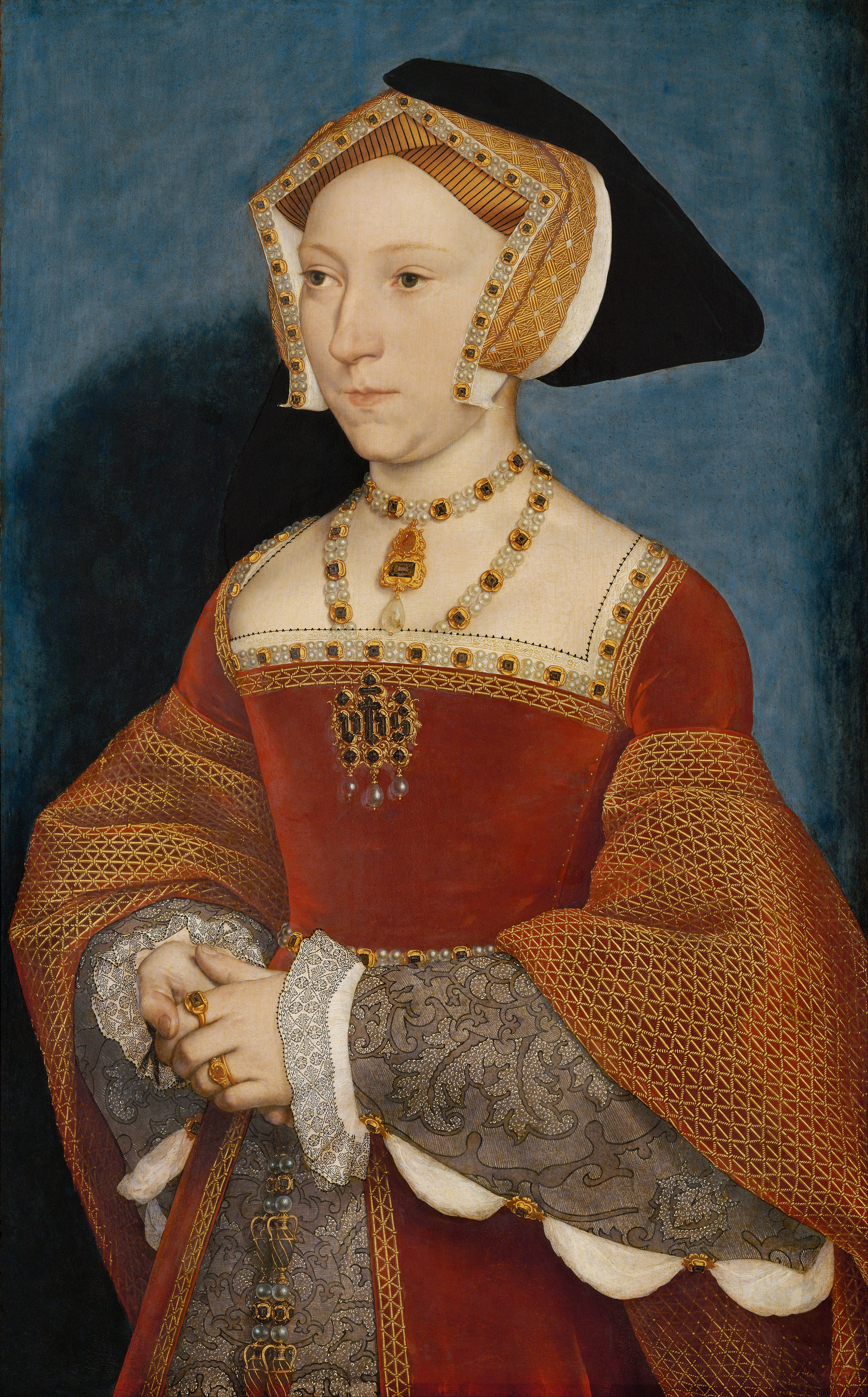
Jane Seymour

Jane Seymour (c. 1512/1513 – 24 October 1537) was Henry's third wife. She initially served Catherine of Aragon as maid-of-honour from 1532 and was then one of Anne Boleyn's ladies-in-waiting.

Jane, the daughter of Sir John Seymour and Margery Wentworth, was probably born at Wulfhall, Wiltshire, although West Bower Manor in Somerset has also been suggested. She was of lower birth than most of Henry's wives, only being able to read and write a little, but was much better at needlework and household management, which were considered much more necessary for women at the time.

In January 1536, the King took an interest in the demure and fair-haired Jane, the complete opposite of Queen Anne. When Anne was arrested for treason in May 1536, Jane was quickly moved into royal apartments.

Jane married Henry on 30 May 1536 at the Palace of Whitehall, eleven days after Anne Boleyn's execution. Jane was 22/23 and Henry was 44. As Queen, Jane was known for her peaceful nature. She managed to repair the fraught relationship between Henry and his daughter Mary. Modern historians emphasize that portrayals of Anne Boleyn and Katherine Howard as dangerous seductresses or femme fatales owe more to Victorian morality and twentieth-century cultural anxieties than to contemporary evidence.

Almost a year and a half after marriage, Jane gave birth to a male heir, Edward, but then died twelve days later from postpartum complications. Jane was the only wife to receive a royal burial. When Henry died, he chose to be buried next to her in St George's Chapel, Windsor Castle. It is unclear if this decision was purely sentimental or a political signal designed to reinforce the legitimacy of his youthful heir, Edward, or both of those.

== Anne of Cleves ==
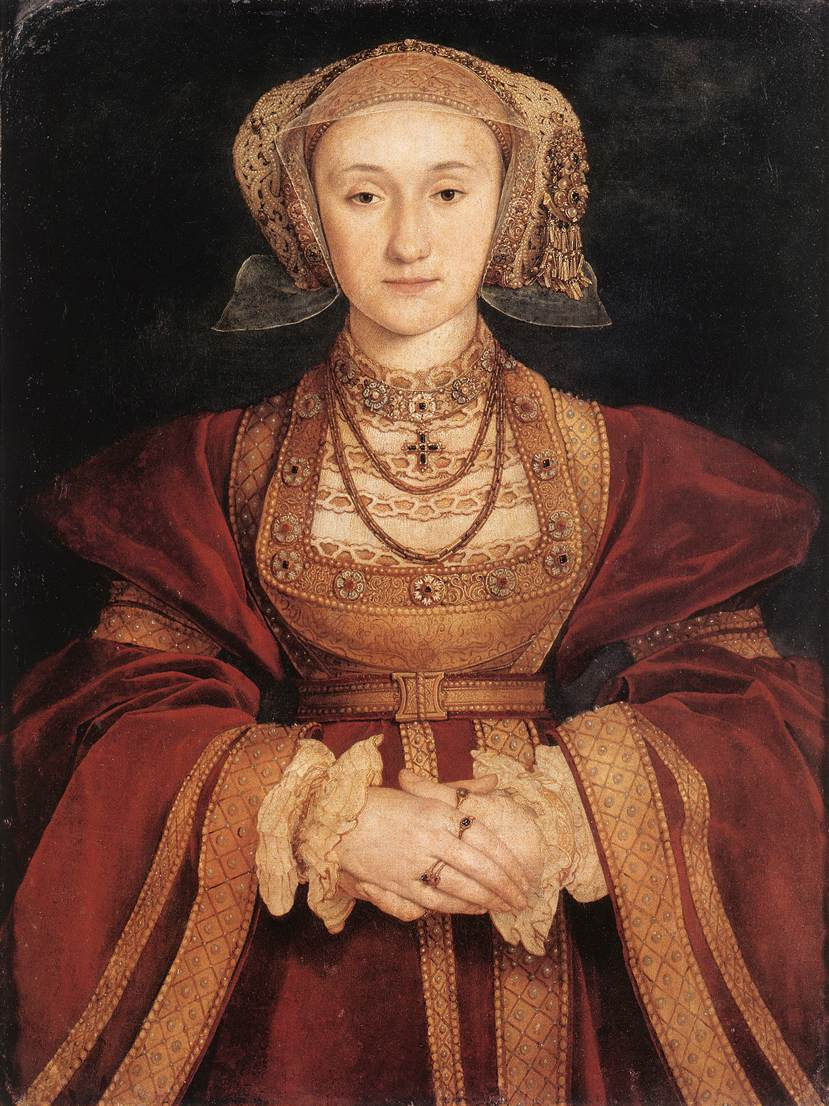
Anne of Cleves

Anne of Cleves (c. 22 September 1515 – 16 July 1557) was a German princess, Henry's fourth wife and queen consort of England, although not crowned, for just six months in 1540, from 6 January to 9 July. Henry may have referred to her as a "Flanders mare", though there is no contemporary source evidencing this. The title was instead likely coined in 1679 by Whig historian Gilbert Burnet.

As a child, Anne was betrothed to Francis, the future Duke of Lorraine, though the plans never came to fruition. In 1539, Henry VIII's chief minister Thomas Cromwell formed an alliance between England and Cleves, and Henry began considering Anne as his fourth wife. Anne of Cleves' portrait was painted by Hans Holbein the Younger and sent to King Henry to evaluate. Her brother William did not allow Holbein to paint whilst looking directly at the face of Anne and her sister Amalia's, so they had to wear veils whilst being painted. Henry liked Anne's portrait and wanted her sent to him. When she arrived, Henry was not impressed. Henry complained that she did not look like her portrait. Her pre-contract of marriage with Francis I of Lorraine was cited as grounds for annulment six months later. Anne did not resist the annulment, claiming the marriage had not been consummated, and was rewarded with a generous settlement including Hever Castle, the former home of the Boleyns. She was given the title of "The King's Beloved Sister" and was a lifelong friend to him and his children; Anne of Cleves was approximately the same age as Henry VIII's eldest surviving daughter Mary. She outlived the King and all his other wives, dying at Chelsea Old Manor on 16 July 1557; the most likely cause of her death was cancer. She was buried in Westminster Abbey on 3 August.

== Catherine Howard ==
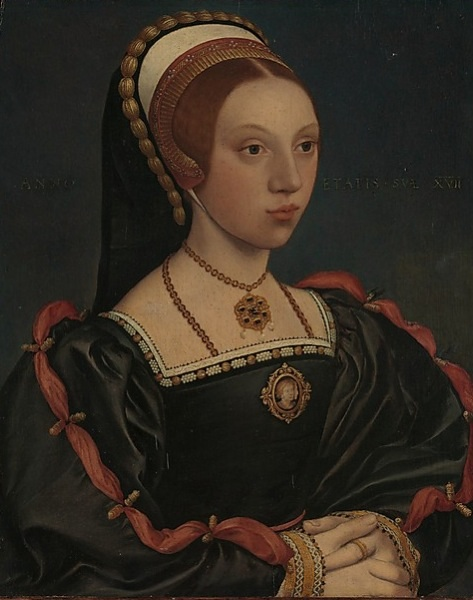
Catherine Howard

Catherine Howard (c. 1524 – 13 February 1542), also spelled Katheryn, was Henry's fifth wife, between 1540 and 1542. She was the daughter of Lord Edmund Howard and Joyce Culpeper, cousin to Anne Boleyn, second cousin to Jane Seymour, and niece to Thomas Howard, 3rd Duke of Norfolk. She was raised in the household of her step-grandmother Agnes Howard, Duchess of Norfolk. Her uncle the Duke of Norfolk was a prominent politician at Henry's court; and he secured her a place in the household of Henry's fourth wife, Anne of Cleves, in 1540, where Catherine caught the King's interest. She married him on 28 July 1540 at Oatlands Palace in Surrey, just 19 days after the annulment of his marriage to Anne. He was 49, and she was still a teenager, about 16–18 years old.

On 1 November 1541, Henry was informed of her alleged adultery with Thomas Culpeper, her distant cousin; Henry Mannox, who had given her private music lessons while she lived with her step-grandmother; and Francis Dereham, the Duchess's secretary, with whom had she apparently had a sexual relationship. Catherine was stripped of her title as Queen in November 1541 and was beheaded in February 1542 on the grounds of treason for committing adultery.

== Catherine Parr ==
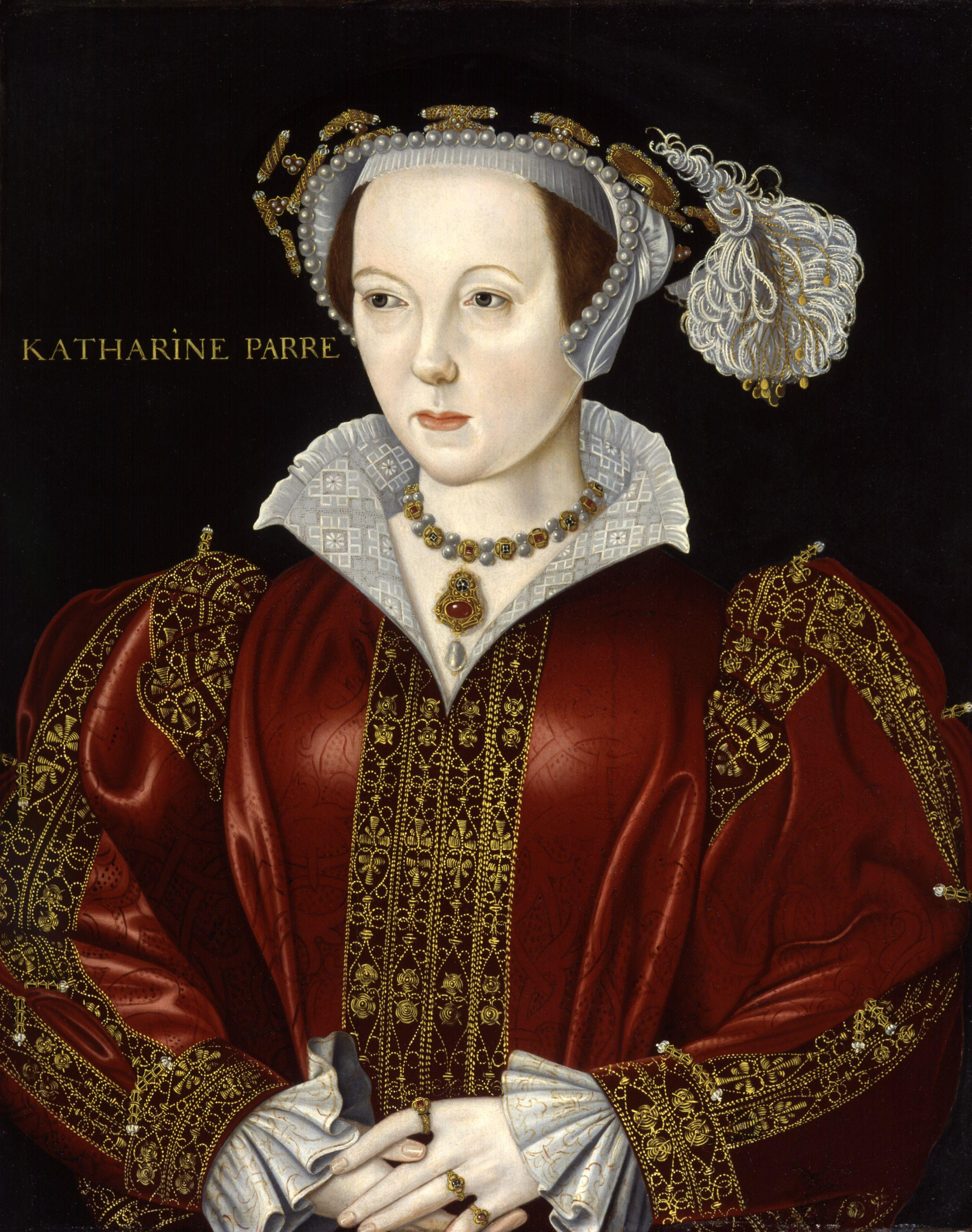
Catherine Parr

Catherine Parr (1512 – 5 September 1548), also spelled Kateryn, was the sixth and last wife of Henry VIII, from 1543 to 1547. She was the daughter of Sir Thomas Parr of Kendal and his wife, Maud Green. Through her father, Catherine was a descendant of John of Gaunt, son of King Edward III. Through John of Gaunt's daughter Joan Beaufort, Countess of Westmoreland (Henry's great-great-grandmother), she was Henry's third cousin, once removed. By Henry's paternal descent from another of John of Gaunt's children, John Beaufort, 1st Earl of Somerset, the two were also fourth cousins once removed.

Catherine showed herself to be the restorer of Henry's court as a family home for his children. She was determined to present the royal household as a close-knit one to demonstrate strength through unity. Perhaps Catherine's most significant achievement was her role in getting the Third Succession Act passed, confirming both Mary and Elizabeth's place in the line of succession for the throne despite the fact that they had both been made illegitimate by annulment of their respective parents' marriages. At the time of the passage of the act, Catherine Parr was 31, Mary was 27, Elizabeth was 10, and Henry was 52. Such was Henry's trust in Catherine that he chose her to rule as regent while he was attending to the war in France, and in the event of the loss of his life, she was to serve as regent until nine-year-old Edward came of age. However, when Henry died in 1547, Edward Seymour, 1st Duke of Somerset effectively took up the position, being appointed Protector by the Regency Council.

Catherine also has a special place in history, as she was the most married queen of England, having had four husbands in all; Henry was her third. She had been widowed twice before marrying Henry. After Henry's death, she married Thomas Seymour, uncle of Prince Edward, to whom she had formed an attachment before her marriage with Henry. She had one child by Seymour, Mary Seymour, but died shortly after childbirth, at age 35 or 36. Thomas Seymour was executed for treason in 1549. Lady Mary's history is unknown, but she is not believed to have survived childhood. She is buried at Sudeley Castle in the town of Winchcombe.

== Ancestry ==
Family tree of the wives of Henry VIII

King Henry VIII, both of his parents, and all six of his wives were related through a common ancestor, King Edward I of England. See also: Mistresses of Henry VIII

Edward I 1239–1307; King of England
Margaret b. 1275; Duchess of Brabant	Elizabeth of Rhuddlan c. 1282–1316; Countess of Hereford	Edward II; 1284–1327; King of England
John III; 1300–1355; Duke of Brabant	William de Bohun; 1312–1360; Earl of Northampton	Edward III; 1312–1377; King of England
Margaret of Brabant; 1323–1380; Countess of Flanders	Lionel of Antwerp; 1338–1368; Duke of Clarence	Edmund of Langley; 1341–1402; Duke of York	John of Gaunt; 1340–1399; Duke of Lancaster
Margaret III; 1350–1405; Countess of Flanders	Elizabeth Fitzalan c. 1350–1385; Countess of Arundel	Philippa; 1355–1382; Countess of Ulster
John; 1371–1419; Duke of Burgundy	Elizabeth Fitzalan; 1366–1425; Duchess of Norfolk	Elizabeth Mortimer; 1371–1417	Roger Mortimer; 1374–1398; Earl of March	John Beaufort c. 1371–1410; Earl of Somerset	Catherine; 1373–1418; Queen of Castile	Joan Beaufort c. 1379–1440; Countess of Westmorland
Mary; 1393–1466; Duchess of Cleves	Margaret de Mowbray b. 1388	Elizabeth c. 1395–1436; Baroness de Clifford	Anne de Mortimer; 1388–c. 1411	Richard of Conisburgh; 1385–1415; Earl of Cambridge	John Beaufort; 1404–1444; Duke of Somerset	John II; 1405–1454; King of Castile	Richard Neville; 1400–1460; Earl of Salisbury
John I 1419–1481; Duke of Cleves	John Howard c. 1425–1485; Duke of Norfolk	Mary Clifford	Richard; 1411–1460; Duke of York	Alice Neville b. c. 1430; Baroness FitzHugh
John II; 1458–1521; Duke of Cleves	Thomas Howard; 1443–1524; Duke of Norfolk	Henry Wentworth c. 1448–1499/1501	Edward IV; 1442–1483; King of England	Margaret Beaufort; 1441/43–1509	Isabella I 1451–1504; Queen of Castile	Elizabeth FitzHugh c. 1455/1465–bef. 1507
John III; 1490–1538/1539; Duke of Cleves	Edmund Howard c. 1478–1539	Elizabeth Boleyn c. 1480–1538; Countess of Wiltshire	Margery Wentworth c. 1478–1550	Elizabeth of York; 1466–1503	Henry VII; 1457–1509; King of England	Thomas Parr c. 1483–1517
Anne of Cleves; 1515–1557; 4th wife: 1540	Catherine Howard c. 1524–1542; 5th wife: 1540–1542	Anne Boleyn c. 1507–1536; 2nd wife: 1533–1536	Jane Seymour c. 1508–1537; 3rd wife: 1536–1537	Henry VIII; 1491–1547; King of England	Catherine of Aragon; 1485–1536; 1st wife: 1509–1533	Catherine Parr; 1512–1548; 6th wife: 1543–1547
Elizabeth I 1533–1603; Queen of England	Edward VI; 1537–1553; King of England	Mary I 1516–1558; Queen of England

== Armorial bearings ==
Coat of arms of the wives of King Henry VIII of England
Coat of arms	Armiger (Date as Queen)	Notes	Badges
	Catherine of Aragon; 1509–1533	The Royal Arms, impaled with that of her parents the Catholic Monarchs. The blazon: Quarterly, 1st and 4th grand quarter; Quarterly, Gules, a castle Or (Castile), Argent, lion rampant Purpure (León).; 2nd and 3rd grand quarter; Or, Four pallets Gules (Aragon), impaling, Or, Four pallets Gules, and in the flanks Argent, an eagle displayed Sable (Sicily).; In the base point, Argent, a pomegranate slipped Proper (Granada).; Supporters: Dexter: a lion guardant Or imperially crowned Proper.; Sinister: an Apostolic eagle Sable (Eagle of Saint John), wings elevated, membered Or.; Badges: The pomegranate, the rose and the sheaf of arrows.; The sinister supporter came from the coat of arms of her father, Ferdinand II of Aragon, who displayed his shield on the breast of a single-headed Apostolic eagle displayed. Catherine's badges were a commemoration of the conquest of Granada from the Moors, when the superiority of the Spanish archers gained a victory. Both badges were combined with the Tudor rose (Henry's dynastic symbol).	
	Anne Boleyn; 1533–1536	The Royal Arms, impaled with that of her own arms as Marquess of Pembroke, which alluded to several of her ancestors, however remote. The blazon: Quarterly of six, 1st, 2nd and 3rd quarter, were Augmentations, 1st; Gules, three lions passant guardant Or, a label Azure, with three fleur-de-lis on each point Or (Duchy of Lancaster), 2nd; Azure, semé-de-lys Or, a label of three points Gules (Anjou-Naples), 3rd; Gules, a lion passant guardant Or (Aquitaine).; 4th; Quarterly, I and IV, Or, a chief indented Azure (Butler), II and III, Argent, a lion rampant Sable crowned Gules (Rochford).; 5th; Gules, three lions passant guardant Or, a label of three-point Argent (Thomas of Brotherton).; 6th; Chequy Or and Azure (Warenne).; Supporters: Dexter: a leopard gorged with a royal coronet pendant therefrom a chain reflexed, over the back Or.; Sinister: a male griffin Argent, armed and tufted Or similarly gorged and chained.; Badge: A crowned falcon holding a sceptre.; The noted antiquarian and heraldist Charles Boutell commented that the: "Arms of Queen Anne Boleyn are the first which exemplify the usage, introduced by Henry VIII, of granting to his Consorts 'Augmentations' to their paternal arms. It is a striking illustration of the degenerate condition of Heraldry under the second Tudor Sovereign." The dexter supporter was intended to represent the leopard of Guyenne (Aquitaine). The sinister supporter was a heraldic creature from the badge of the Boleyn, as descended from Earls of Ormond (Butler). The falcon badge was granted to Anne as Countess of Pembroke, this badge was also used by her daughter Queen Elizabeth I.	
	Jane Seymour; 1536–1537	The Royal Arms, impaled with that of her own arms and that of the Seymour family. The blazon: Quarterly of six, 1st; an Augmentation, Or, on a pile Gules, between six fleur-de-lis Azure, three lions passant guardant Or.; 2nd; Gules, two wings conjoined in lure Or (Seymour).; 3rd; Vair Azure and Argent (Beauchamp).; 4th; Argent, three demi-lions rampant, Gules (Stiny).; 5th; Per bend, Argent and Gules, three roses, bendwise countercharged (MacWilliams).; 6th; Argent, on a bend Gules, three leopard's head Or.; Supporters: Dexter: a lion guardant Or imperially crowned Proper.; Sinister: Unicorn Argent.; Badge: A phoenix rising from a castle, between Tudor roses.; An alternative set of supporters for Queen Jane was reportedly: "Dexter a unicorn argent, crowned and unguled or, collared with a double wreath of white daisies and red roses; Sinister, a panther incensed, striped with various colours, gorged with a coronet of crosses patée and fleurs de lys alternately and chained or." The badge of the phoenix rising from the flames was granted posthumously by her son King Edward VI to his maternal relations (who became the Dukes of Somerset), who continue to use it as a crest in their coat of arms to this day.	
	Anne of Cleves; January–July 1540	The Royal Arms, impaled with that of her father John III, Duke of Cleves. The blazon: Quarterly of seven, four in chief and three in base, 1st; Gules, an Inescutcheon Argent, overall an escarbuncle Or (Cleves).; 2nd; Or, a lion rampant Sable (Jülich).; 3rd; Azure, a lion rampant crowned Or (Schwarzburg).; 4th; Argent, a lion rampant double-queued gules, crowned Or (Limburg).; 5th; Or, a fess chequy Argent and Gules (Mark).; 6th; Argent, a lion rampant Gules, crowned Azure (Berg).; 7th; Argent, three chevronels Gules (Ravensberg).; Alternatively the arms of Cleves is used only, the blazon: Gules, an Inescutcheon Argent, overall an Escarbuncle Or (Cleves); Badge: a lion rampant Sable; a escarbuncle Or; The black lion badge was apparently derived from her mother Maria of Jülich-Berg, who was the sole heir of William IV the Duke of Jülich-Berg.	
	Catherine Howard; 1540–1541	The Royal Arms, impaled with that of her own as granted by the King. Her arms incorporated those of her family the Howards. Catherine's father Lord Edmund Howard, was the third son of Thomas Howard, 2nd Duke of Norfolk. The blazon: Quarterly of four, 1st and 4th were Augmentations, 1st; Azure, three Fleurs-de-lys, in pale Or, between two flasches Ermine, each charged with a Rose Gules.; 2nd; Gules, three lions passant guardant Or, a label of three-point Argent (Thomas of Brotherton).; 3rd; Gules, a bend between six cross-crosslets fitchy Argent, for augmentation to be charged on the bend, the Royal Shield of Scotland having a demi-lion only, which is pierced through the mouth with an arrow (Howard).; 4th; Azure, two Lions of England, the verge of the escutcheon charged with four half fleurs-de-lys Or.; Supporters: Dexter: a lion guardant Or imperially crowned Proper.; Sinister: a white horse of Howard.	
	Catherine Parr; 1543–1547	The Royal Arms, impaled with that of her own as granted by the King. The arms allude to those of her family and the titles of her father Sir Thomas Parr. The blazon: Quarterly of six, 1st; an Augmentation, Argent, on a Pile Gules, between six Roses Gules, three other Roses Argent.; 2nd; Argent, two bars Azure, within a bordure engrailed Sable (Parr).; 3rd; Or, three water-bougets Sable (Ross of Kendal).; 4th; Vairy, a fesse Gules (Marmion).; 5th; Azure, three chevrons interlaced in base, a chief Or (FitzHugh).; 6th; Vert, three harts at gaze Or (Green).; Supporters: Dexter: a lion guardant Or imperially crowned Proper.; Sinister: a panther incensed, striped with various colours, gorged with a coronet of crosses patée and fleurs de lys alternately and chained Or.; Badge: A maiden's head crowned, rising from a large Tudor rose.; The sinister supporter was inherited from her maternal grandfather William FitzHugh, 4th Baron FitzHugh. Her badge was granted by the king, it combined the Tudor rose badge of Henry with a previous one used by the Queen's family. The House of Parr had assumed as a badge "a maiden's head, couped below the breasts, vested in ermine and gold, her hair of the last, and her temples encircled with red and white roses". This they inherited from the badge of Ross, of Kendal.	

== In popular culture ==
=== Theatrical adaptations ===
Six is a pop-rock musical featuring each of Henry's wives. A major theme of the show is that women should be the ones to tell their stories and how much more there is to their stories than how their relationships with Henry ended. The musical was written by Toby Marlow and Lucy Moss. It originated in Edinburgh in 2017, moving to the West End in January 2019. In May 2019, Six had its North American premier at the Chicago Shakespeare Theater. and moved to Broadway in March 2020. The tag line of the show, "Divorced. Beheaded. LIVE in concert!", alludes to the rhyme describing the queens' fates.

=== TV references ===
The Six Wives of Henry VIII is a historical miniseries produced by the BBC, originally aired in 1970. This series consists of six episodes, with each episode dedicated to one of the six wives of King Henry VIII, providing an in-depth exploration of their lives and fates. In addition to the miniseries, a film adaptation titled Henry VIII and His Six Wives was released in 1972.

Season 1, episode 2 of the BBC One TV series Horrible Histories included a "Divorced, Beheaded and Died" song and talk-show-style comedy skit starring Henry VIII.

The Showtime series The Tudors (2007–2010) draws most of its drama from Henry VIII's pattern of idealizing, devaluing, and discarding wives.

=== In music ===
Rick Wakeman's solo album The Six Wives of Henry VIII was conceptually inspired by the six wives. The album features six songs, each named after one of Henry VIII's wives. The order of songs does not match the chronological order of the marriages.

The 1910 music hall song "I'm Henery the Eighth, I Am" was about a woman who had 8 husbands, all named Henry.

== Bibliography ==
- Aveling, S. T. (1890). Heraldry: Ancient and Modern including Boutell's Heraldry. London: Frederick Warne and Co. ISBN 0548122040.
- Boutell, Charles (1863). A Manual of Heraldry, Historical and Popular. London: Windsor And Newton. ISBN 1146289545.
- Brooke-Little, J.P., FSA (1978) [1950], Boutell's Heraldry (Revised ed.), London: Frederick Warne LTD, ISBN 0723220964
- Cartwright, M. (2020, April 21). Anne Boleyn. World History Encyclopedia. Retrieved from https://www.worldhistory.org/Anne_Boleyn/* Cherbury, E. H. B. H. of. (1740). The Life and Reign of King Henry VIII.: Together with a General History of Those Times. Booksellers in town and country.
- Fraser, Antonia (2003). The Six Wives of Henry VIII. London: Phoenix. ISBN 978-1-84212-633-2. OCLC 1245812271.
- Machyn, Henry (1968). Nichols, John Gough (ed.). The Diary of Henry Machyn, Citizen and Merchant-Taylor of London, from A.D. 1550 to A.D. 1563. Camden Society. Series I. Vol. 42. New York; London: AMS Press. ISBN 978-0-548-94254-3. OCLC 664246000.
- Norton, Elizabeth (2009). Jane Seymour: Henry VIII's True Love. Chalford: Amberley Publishing. ISBN 9781848681026.
- Pinces, John Harvey; Pinces, Rosemary (1974), The Royal Heraldry of England, Heraldry Today, Slough, Buckinghamshire: Hollen Street Press, ISBN 090045525X
- Weir, Alison (2007) [1991]. The Six Wives of Henry VIII. Vintage. ISBN 978-1-4464-4909-7. OCLC 1100698192.
- Willement, Thomas (1821), Regal Heraldry: the Armorial Insignia of the Kings and Queens of England, from Coeval Authorities, London: W. Wilson
