= The Six Wives of Henry VIII (1970 TV series) =

1970 British television drama series

- Genre: History; Drama
- Developed by: Maurice Cowan
- Written by: Rosemary Anne Sisson; Nick McCarty; Ian Thorne; Jean Morris; Beverley Cross; John Prebble
- Directed by: John Glenister; Naomi Capon
- Starring: Keith Michell; Annette Crosbie; Dorothy Tutin; Anne Stallybrass; Elvi Hale; Angela Pleasence; Rosalie Crutchley
- Country of origin: United Kingdom
- Original language: English
- No. of series: 1
- No. of episodes: 6

Production
- Producers: Ronald Travers; Mark Shivas
- Running time: 6 × 90 minutes

Original release
- Network: BBC 2
- Release: 1 January – 5 February 1970

Related
- Elizabeth R

The Six Wives of Henry VIII is a series of six television plays produced by the BBC and first transmitted between 1 January and 5 February 1970. The series later aired in the United States on CBS from 1 August to 5 September 1971 (with narration added by Anthony Quayle).

Each of the six plays focuses on a single wife, often from their perspective, and was written by a different dramatist. The series was produced by Mark Shivas and Ronald Travers and directed by Naomi Capon and John Glenister.

== Cast ==
- Keith Michell as Henry VIII
- Wolfe Morris as Thomas Cromwell
- Annette Crosbie as Catherine of Aragon
- Dorothy Tutin as Anne Boleyn
- Anne Stallybrass as Jane Seymour
- Elvi Hale as Anne of Cleves
- Angela Pleasence as Catherine Howard
- Rosalie Crutchley as Catherine Parr
- Patrick Troughton as the Duke of Norfolk
- Bernard Hepton as Archbishop Thomas Cranmer
- Sheila Burrell as Lady Rochford
- Basil Dignam as Bishop Gardiner
- John Woodnutt as Henry VII
- Valentine Palmer as Lord Willoughby
- Mollie Sugden as Lotte, handmaid to Anne of Cleves
- Robert James as Robert Barnes
- Catherine Lacey as Dowager Duchess of Norfolk
- Howard Goorney as Will Sommers, court fool to Henry VIII

== Episodes ==
No.	Title	Directed by	Written by	Runtime	Original release date	US air date
1	"Catherine of Aragon"	John Glenister	Rosemary Anne Sisson	90 minutes	1 January 1970	1 August 1971
Spanish Princess Catherine's brief marriage to Arthur, Prince of Wales, ends with his early death. Over the next few years, Catherine faces financial difficulties, and arrangements for her to marry Prince Henry are undecided. When King Henry VII dies, Henry VIII chooses Catherine as his wife, as his father requested. After a short scene of Catherine and Henry mourning their infant son's death (their second loss after a stillbirth), the programme jumps years ahead to when Henry falls in love with Lady Anne Boleyn. Henry desperately desires a male heir but after numerous pregnancies, only Catherine and Henry's daughter, Princess Mary (the future Mary I), has survived. Catherine is heartbroken when Henry wants to dissolve their marriage. There are several court scenes discussing an annulment. Cardinal Thomas Wolsey fails to fulfil Henry's desire to obtain a divorce from Catherine (and later dies while en route to the Tower of London). Henry attempts a papal trial in England to judge the validity of his marriage based on Catherine having been married to his brother. Henry claims this makes their marriage incestuous, while Catherine insists that her marriage to Arthur was never consummated, thereby invalidating it. When Rome and the Pope refuse Henry's request, he begins his break with the Catholic Church and sows the seeds for the eventual English Reformation. Catherine is eventually told her marriage to Henry has been annulled, making her daughter Mary illegitimate and removed as Henry's heir, and that the king has married Anne. Catherine is sent away from court. Later, news arrives that Anne has given birth to a daughter, the future Elizabeth I. Catherine dies, her faithful servant María de Salinas at her bedside. Henry reads Catherine's loving final letter, then crushes it and callously walks away.
2	"Anne Boleyn"	Naomi Capon	Nick McCarty	88 minutes	8 January 1970	8 August 1971
Anne's rise having been shown in the preceding episode, the focus is primarily on her downfall, documenting her disintegrating marriage to Henry amid two miscarriages and the king's infidelities. Anne's brother, George Boleyn, Viscount Rochford (with whom she is eventually accused of committing incest), is shown anxiously trying to advise and counsel her to be more prudent and cautious in her conduct with the king. Anne's continual berating Henry for his affairs elicits threats from him in return. Anne's final failure to give Henry a son seals her doom, and she is tried, convicted on the basis of false evidence, and beheaded. The storyline was heavily influenced by academic theories which presented Anne as the victim of a factional and political plot, concocted by her many enemies (among them, Thomas Cromwell and Lady Rochford, Anne's sister-in-law), who capitalised on the king's disillusionment with her. The scriptwriter used Anne's final confession of her sins (a burden that Archbishop Thomas Cranmer would have to bear to the end of his days), to suggest her innocence on charges of adultery, incest, treason and witchcraft.
3	"Jane Seymour"	John Glenister	Ian Thorne	90 minutes	15 January 1970	15 August 1971
After a long and difficult labour, Queen Jane gives birth to Prince Edward, (the future Edward VI). When she is taken to her son's christening, she is in pain and near death; while in her sickbed, the events of her life flash before her in a feverish dream. Henry, still married to Queen Anne, falls in love with Jane. Her relations (and some of Henry's councillors like Thomas Cromwell, Bishop Stephen Gardiner and others), plot Anne Boleyn's downfall and Jane's ascension to queen. Days after Anne's execution, Henry and Jane are married. During her short time as queen, Jane has some success reconciling Princess Mary with Henry. Her pregnancy is guilt-ridden, knowing her predecessor was innocent, the victim of false witness. After Jane gives birth to the prince, she falls ill with childbed fever; this brings the episode full circle. Jane dies, and the last images are her body lying in state with Henry sobbing next to the funeral bier.
4	"Anne of Cleves"	John Glenister	Jean Morris	90 minutes	22 January 1970	22 August 1971
With three dead wives and only one legitimate son, Henry's councillors urge him to marry again and further secure the succession. Thomas Cromwell proposes an alliance with Protestant Cleves (now part of modern Germany), so he considers the Duke of Cleves' two sisters, Anne and Amelia. He sends artist Hans Holbein, who paints both girls. Based on the portrait and good reports of her, Henry chooses Anne. When she reaches England, Henry, wishing to surprise her, arrives in disguise. As he is unannounced, Anne is frightened and then horrified upon realising that the obese and bawdy "messenger" is really her betrothed. Henry, rattled by her reaction, declares her ugly and attempts to nullify the marriage contract, but this proves impossible and the wedding proceeds with two unwilling participants. When the time comes to consummate their union, Anne sees a possible escape from the marriage by stalling the already unenthusiastic king. In the following weeks, Anne and Henry live separate lives at court, although Anne is shown as being close to his children, especially young Elizabeth. Politics then take centre stage as Thomas Howard, Duke of Norfolk, plots Cromwell's downfall by playing on Henry's infatuation with Norfolk's young niece, Catherine Howard. The reasons for the Cleves alliance have also shifted, making the marriage to Anne politically inconvenient. Cromwell, the alliance's architect, knows he is doomed and warns the queen, who plans an exit from the marriage rather than risk a worse fate. Archbishop Cranmer offers Anne advice and sympathy; they both regret Cromwell's and Robert Barnes' downfall. Encouraging Henry to believe it is his own idea, Anne tells Henry that she understands his demands for an annulment, and suggests that he give her a household of her own, with continued contact with Henry's children, of whom she is fond. She points out that if they both agree that the marriage was never consummated, an annulment should be easy. Given a graceful exit from the marriage and wife he is uninterested in, Henry gradually agrees, saying "Good night, my dear sister." The episode ends on Anne's bittersweet but relieved expression. The portrayal of Anne of Cleves is based largely on the writer's interpretation of obscure historical events. She is shown to have a strong grasp of politics. It provides an interpretation of the facts of the annulment and the reason why Anne survived her marriage to Henry to live long into the reign of his daughter, Mary.
5	"Catherine Howard"	Naomi Capon	Beverley Cross	90 minutes	29 January 1970	29 August 1971
The Duke of Norfolk visits his elderly mother to see if one of his nieces would be a suitable enticement for King Henry. His ambition is clear: he wants a Howard on the throne of England. We see Catherine Howard, a pretty and foolhardy teenager, who confides in her cousin, Anne Carey, that she had sexual relations with a young man named Francis Dereham the previous summer. Her governess, Lady Rochford (the former sister-in-law of the late queen Anne Boleyn), takes her to the duke, who informs her that she will be the next queen of England. She states her concerns arising from Anne Boleyn's fate, but her uncle assures her all will be well if she follows his instructions and does not show fear or timidity when addressing the king. Norfolk is unaware of his niece's sexual past, as Catherine claims she is a virgin. She meets King Henry, who is now in ill-health with a perpetual ulcer on his leg. She flirts with and charms the king, who is immediately taken with her. They are married, but on their wedding night Henry's impotence is revealed. Another difficulty arises when Dereham blackmails the queen regarding their past romance. She makes him her private secretary to quieten him. To secure her future, Norfolk insists she produce a male heir in any way possible. Catherine (with Lady Rochford as a go-between) begins a desperate affair with Thomas Culpeper, Henry's young and dashing gentleman of the privy chamber. Months pass with no sign of a pregnancy, and rumours spread throughout the court regarding the affair, as well as about Catherine's past indiscretions with both Dereham and a music teacher named Henry Mannox. With disclosure threatened, Norfolk betrays his niece to the king before his enemies can. Culpeper and Dereham are taken to the Tower of London, tortured, and later executed. Norfolk and the king's guards come to arrest Catherine and Lady Rochford. Catherine demands to see the king, but is denied. After being condemned, she is confined to the Tower where she rehearses a speech to give at her execution, and practises laying her head on a block. The episode ends with the king preparing for treatment on his ulcerated leg and banishing Norfolk, who has fallen far from favour. Henry warns Norfolk that if he ever looks upon him again, it will only be upon his head.
6	"Catherine Parr"	Naomi Capon	John Prebble	88 minutes	5 February 1970	5 September 1971
Catherine Parr, the recently widowed Lady Latimer, is summoned before the king. Though only in his 50s, Henry looks older, is morbidly obese, sick and lonely. He takes to the mature twice-widowed lady, and her honesty and calmness entice him. She declines his marriage offer. However, the ambitious Edward and Thomas Seymour (brothers of the late Queen, Jane Seymour) urge her to accept Henry's proposal. Thomas, even though he and Catherine share romantic feelings, is especially eager that she should marry Henry. Archbishop Cranmer also encourages the devoutly Protestant Catherine to marry the king. Catherine soon becomes queen of England; her natural maternal instinct is put into practice with the king's children, Mary, Elizabeth, and Edward. However, Catholic Bishop Gardiner dislikes Catherine's religious views. He plots her downfall and questions her ladies. Gardiner even has one woman, Anne Askew (not one of Catherine's ladies, but a notable religious writer and speaker whose works Catherine had read), put to the rack. Catherine is horrified by Askew's story and confronts her husband and Gardiner. Henry is angered by her liberal opinions and angrily rejects her. Soon, an arrest warrant for the queen to be "examined" (which is practically a death sentence) is issued. Catherine is terrified, but Cranmer advises her to assume a modest, humble and apologetic attitude to the king, resulting in Henry forgiving her. Soon after, Henry collapses, obviously near death. After a long bedside vigil, the king dies. Thomas Seymour proposes to Catherine. Still in mourning, Catherine berates him for attempting to take the king's place, but she accepts.

== Reception ==
Historian Eric Ives commended the interpretation of writers Rosemary Sisson and Nick McCarty as leading the modern audience to a better understanding of the actions and values of King Henry and Anne Boleyn.

=== Awards and honours ===
Year	Award	Category	Recipient(s)	Result
1970	Prix Italia	Original Dramatic Program	Jane Seymour	Won
1971	BAFTA Awards	Best Actor	Keith Michell	Won
1971	BAFTA Awards	Best Actress	Annette Crosbie	Won
1971	BAFTA Awards	Best Production Design	Peter Seddon	Won
1971	BAFTA Awards	Best Costume Design	John Bloomfield	Won
1971	BAFTA Awards	Special Award	Ronald Travers; Mark Shivas	Won
1971	BAFTA Awards	Best Drama Production	Ronald Travers; Mark Shivas	Nominated
1971	BAFTA Awards	Best Drama Production (Single Program)	John Glenister (Catherine of Aragon)	Nominated
1971	BAFTA Awards	Best Actress	Dorothy Tutin	Nominated
1972	24th Primetime Emmy Awards	Outstanding Single Performance by an Actor in a Leading Role	Keith Michell	Won
1972	24th Primetime Emmy Awards	Outstanding Continued Performance by an Actor in a Leading Role in a Dramatic Series	Keith Michell	Nominated
1972	24th Primetime Emmy Awards	Outstanding Drama Series	Ronald Travers; Mark Shivas	Nominated
1972	24th Primetime Emmy Awards	Outstanding New Series	Ronald Travers; Mark Shivas	Nominated
1972	24th Primetime Emmy Awards	Outstanding Single Program, Drama or Comedy	Ronald Travers; Mark Shivas	Nominated

== Legacy ==
The series spawned a sequel, Elizabeth R (1971), starring Glenda Jackson, which included several performers reprising their roles in the first episode: Ronane, Hepton, Dignam and Crutchley. A prequel, The Shadow of the Tower (1972), starred James Maxwell and Norma West as Henry's parents, Henry VII and Elizabeth of York.

Jane Seymour writer Ian Thorne adapted the series into the film Henry VIII and His Six Wives (1972). Michell reprises his role, with the wives being portrayed by Frances Cuka, Charlotte Rampling, Jane Asher, Jenny Bos, Lynne Frederick and Barbara Leigh-Hunt. Cromwell is played by Donald Pleasence, and the Dukes of Norfolk and Suffolk by Michael Gough and Brian Blessed.

== See also ==
- Wives of Henry VIII
- Cultural depictions of Henry VIII
- Cultural depictions of Anne Boleyn
