= John Lassells =

English Protestant martyr (died 1546)

John Lassells (also Lascelles; died 1546) was an English sixteenth-century courtier and Protestant martyr. His report to Archbishop Thomas Cranmer initiated the investigation which led to the execution of Queen Katherine Howard.

== Life ==
Lassells was the son of Richard, or George, Lassells (d. 1522), gentleman, and his wife Dorothy, the daughter of Sir Brian Sandford; he was most probably born at Sturton le Steeple and from about 1520 was a ward of Sir John Hercy of Grove. He entered the household of Sir Francis Bryan in the 1530s after studying law at Furnival's Inn, but was dismissed in 1538 because of his advocacy of religious reform. He was in the service of Henry VIII's chief minister, Thomas Cromwell, an advocate of religious reform, as a messenger in 1538–9. In late 1539 Lassells, a client-friend of the Earl of Surrey, was appointed as a Sewer in the King's Privy Chamber. After Cromwell's execution on 28 July 1540, Lassells is recorded as having advised his fellow reformers in September of that year that although Bishop Stephen Gardiner and Thomas Howard, 3rd Duke of Norfolk, the principal members of the conservative faction at court, were obstacles to further religious reform, they would eventually overthrow themselves if left alone.

Despite this advice to his co-religionists to let matters take their own course, Lassells was personally involved in the following year in the downfall of Norfolk's niece, Queen Katherine Howard. Before her marriage to John Hall, Lassells' sister Mary had been in the household of Norfolk's stepmother, the Dowager Duchess of Norfolk at Lambeth while Katherine was a young girl under the lax guardianship of the Duchess, her step-grandmother. When Katherine became Queen, Lassells, an ardent reformist, had suggested to his sister that she should seek a place in Katherine's household, but Mary refused, giving as her reason that she knew Katherine to be "light both in living and in condytions", and describing the Queen's several sexual indiscretions before her marriage. They included that with her music master, Henry Manox, and a Howard kinsman, Francis Dereham, in the Dowager Duchess's household. Lassells immediately reported Mary's words to Archbishop Thomas Cranmer, setting in motion a process which ended with the Queen's execution. According to Ryrie, Lassells "maintained that he revealed the information to avert a charge of misprision of treason, which may well be true, but he can hardly have regretted the destruction of so prominent a Howard".

By 1546 Lassells was dissatisfied with the pace of religious reform, and about 11 May of that year he was arrested and sent to the Tower. He was denounced as a patron of Richard Laynam, "a London prophet who predicted the imminent overthrow of the King", is described by John Bale as the "instructour" of his friend, the sacramentarian Anne Askew, and is considered by a modern historian, A. G. Dickens, to have been the "leading spirit" of the radical group at court. Lascells was arraigned for heresy on 12 July, refused to recant, and on 16 July 1546 was burned at Smithfield with Anne Askew and two others. While in prison he wrote a Protestation which was printed after his death. His story is recorded in Foxe's Book of Martyrs.
