= Murder Most Royal =

Novel by Eleanor Hibbert (as Jean Plaidy)

First edition (publ. Robert Hale)

Murder Most Royal (a.k.a. The King's Pleasure) (1949) is a historical fiction novel by Jean Plaidy. It is the fifth volume of The Tudor Saga, which began with Uneasy Lies the Head and ends with Lord Robert.

The novel focuses on two of Henry VIII's wives, Anne Boleyn and Catherine Howard. It begins with Anne as a young woman leaving for Brussels, then returning to England; her rise to power in the English court; her marriage to Henry VIII as his second wife; and her subsequent execution. In parallel, the life of Catherine Howard, Anne's first cousin, is also recounted. She becomes Henry VIII's fifth wife, but, after claims of adultery, is also executed.

== Characters ==
- Anne Boleyn
- Catherine Howard
- Henry VIII
- Thomas Wolsey
- Thomas Cromwell
- Catherine of Aragon
- Anne of Cleves
- Jane Seymour
- George Boleyn
- Elizabeth Boleyn
- Thomas Boleyn
- Jane Parker
- Agnes Howard
- Thomas Howard
- Mark Smeaton
- Thomas Culpepper
- Henry Mannox
