= West Bower Manor =

Building in Durleigh, Somerset, England

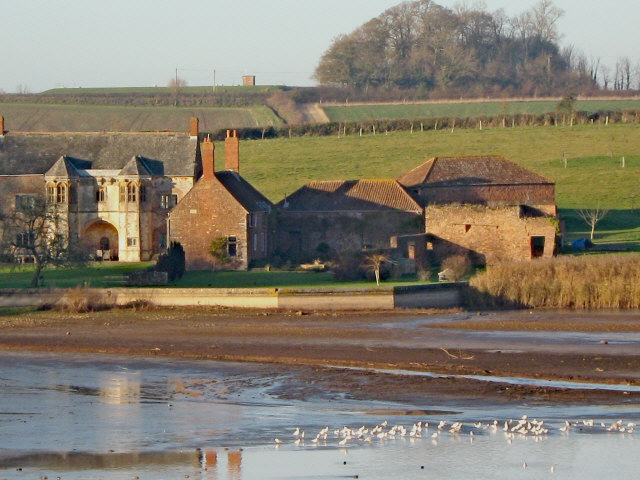
- West Bower Manor on the banks of Durleigh reservoir

- Location within Somerset
- 51.1223°N 3.0507°W
- Location: Durleigh, Somerset, England

Listed Building – Grade II*
- Official name: West Bower Manor with barn
- Designated: 29 March 1963
- Reference no.: 1058940

West Bower Manor (also known as Durleigh Manor) in Durleigh within the English county of Somerset was largely built in the 15th century. It is a Grade II* listed building.

== History ==
West Bower Manor is all that remains of a large manorial property, the majority of which has been demolished. Parts of the building date from the 15th century though the core of the fabric may even be earlier, further parts were built in the 17th and 19th centuries.

It was the seat of the historical estate of "West Bower" (Bower Delamere) once held by Edward Seymour, 1st Duke of Somerset, the brother of Jane Seymour, Henry VIII`s Queen, who is reputed to have been born at West Bower Manor. Seymour had inherited it from his cousin Margaret Coker, the last of the Cokers a local landowning family who had been lord of the manor since the Cokers had been granted the land by King Stephen. Coker had been granted the right to add an oratory in 1339.

The estate became part of the estate of Halswell House in the second half of the 16th century and has been used as a farm since then.

It stands on the banks of Durleigh reservoir which was built in 1938.

== Architecture ==
The principal surviving element from the Medieval manor is the gatehouse. It is an example of Decorated-Perpendicular architecture.

The stone building has been extensively restored, but is a good example of a former courtyard gatehouse with a pair of faceted turrets on either side of the former entrance passageway. The adjacent farmhouse was built in the 19th century.
