= Henry VIII (TV serial) =

- DVD cover art
- Genre: Historical drama
- Written by: Peter Morgan
- Directed by: Pete Travis
- Starring: Ray Winstone; Helena Bonham Carter
- Narrated by: Derek Jacobi
- Composer: Rob Lane
- Country of origin: United Kingdom
- Original language: English
- No. of series: 1
- No. of episodes: 2

Production
- Executive producers: Justin Bodle; Rebecca Eaton; Andy Harries; Peter Morgan; Bill Shephard
- Producer: Francis Hopkinson
- Running time: 193 minutes
- Production companies: Granada Television; Powercorp; WGBH Boston; ABC

Original release
- Network: ITV
- Release: 12 October – 19 October 2003

Henry VIII is a two-part British television serial produced principally by Granada Television for ITV from 12 to 19 October 2003. It chronicles the life of King Henry VIII of England from the disintegration of his first marriage to an aging Spanish princess until his death following a stroke in 1547, by which time he had married for the sixth time. Additional production funding was provided by WGBH Boston, Powercorp and the Australian Broadcasting Corporation.

It stars Ray Winstone in his first role in a costume drama. His co-star is Helena Bonham Carter who played Henry VIII's second wife, Anne Boleyn; her character dominates the first episode and her dramatic death brings the first part of the story to its conclusion. David Suchet also makes an appearance as Henry's first chief minister, Cardinal Thomas Wolsey. The second episode, which follows the last eleven years of Henry's life, sees Winstone act opposite Emilia Fox, as his docile third wife Jane Seymour, Sean Bean as Robert Aske, leader of the Pilgrimage of Grace, and Emily Blunt (in her first major appearance) as Catherine Howard, the teenager coerced into becoming Henry's fifth queen.

== Plot ==
=== Episode 1 ===
The first episode opens to reveal a dying Henry VII mistaking his heir Henry VIII for his late son Arthur Tudor. Concerned for the fragile chances of his family's dynasty, the dying king implores his son to marry his brother's widow Catherine of Aragon and have a son to secure the family line. Fifteen years later Henry VIII is the most popular King to ever sit on the throne, but he still does not have a son by his Queen, only a daughter Mary. Elsewhere at Hever Castle in Kent the Boleyn Family celebrate the engagement of their daughter Anne to Henry Percy the future Earl of Northumberland. The head of the family the Duke of Norfolk assures her father, Thomas Boleyn, that he has the king's ear on the match and that he will give them permission to marry but once the roving eye of the king falls upon Anne, he quickly finds a reason for the marriage to be cancelled and wastes no time in persuading her for himself, even riding from his secluded coastal castle to Kent during an outbreak of illness. Resolved that Anne will not become his mistress, but his wife, the King instructs his chancellor Cardinal Wolsey to find a way for his marriage to his devoted wife to be annulled, prompting two opportunistic Protestant reformers, Thomas Cromwell and Thomas Cranmer, to provide a way for the king to marry Anne Boleyn and bring untold wealth to his pocket but only if he breaks with the Catholic Church. Finally, his wife Anne is soon pregnant, only for Henry's hopes to be dashed. Instead of the longed for son and heir, Anne delivers a daughter, Elizabeth, and Henry's ardour cools towards her, even more so when he meets the sister of two of his courtiers, Jane Seymour. Despite the growing tensions between the King and Queen, Anne becomes pregnant once more but goes into premature labour and delivers a stillborn son. The first episode ends with an angry King Henry demanding Cromwell get rid of Anne which results in her subsequent trial and execution.

=== Episode 2 ===
The second episode begins with Jane Seymour being dressed for her wedding and her subsequent introduction to the people who take her to their hearts, whilst the King and Cromwell differ on the dissolution of the monasteries which have angered the English Catholics and united them into a huge army to march on London in protest calling it, the Pilgrimage of Grace, headed by the King's former comrade Robert Aske whom the King tricks into incriminating himself into treason and is sentenced to a gruesome traitor's death. The country is on edge as the Queen goes into labour and finally gives birth to a son, much to Henry's joy, although it is cut short when the Queen dies. Two years after the Queen's death, Cromwell, whose power has steadily risen through the days of Anne Boleyn encourages the King to consider marrying the Protestant Anne of Cleves but once he sets sights on her, the King is repulsed and immediately seeks a way out of the marriage. Seeing the decline of Protestant influence, the Duke of Norfolk devises a way to snatch the reins of power and arranges for his teenage niece Catherine Howard to enchant the increasingly obese and terrifying King and to eventually marry him.

It soon transpires that the young Queen has a promiscuous history and is having an affair with a man in the king's service which the Protestant reformers seize as their opportunity to rid themselves of the Catholic faction. The Queen and her family are arrested and the young Queen dies at the hands of the executioner, like her cousin Anne Boleyn. With the demise of Catholic peers the reformers take the opportunity to consolidate their power, enhanced by the wedding of the king to Catherine Parr who attempts to unite the royal family. The film closes as the King reflects on his past loves. His obsession with Anne Boleyn, his quiet but steady affection for Jane Seymour and his lust for the young Catherine Howard. Finally the king's over indulgent life catches up with him and he suffers a seizure and later dies in a scene reminiscent of the film's opening, imploring his son to be successful as a man before he can be successful as a king. He dies with his son and last wife beside him.

The closing scene of the film provides a summary of the lives of the remaining characters,

Edward became King Edward VI, but his health was frail. He died of consumption aged fifteen. Edward Seymour, Lord Protector of England, he ruled by proxy until 1551 when he was imprisoned in the Tower and beheaded. Thomas Seymour did finally marry Catherine Parr, but broke her heart when he attempted to seduce the fourteen-year-old Princess Elizabeth. He was executed for treason in 1549. Bloody Mary came to the throne in 1553. She burned hundreds of Protestants as heretics and died embittered and unloved in 1558. Anne of Cleves outlived all the wives. Widely liked and respected, she was buried rich and popular with full honours. Thomas Cranmer continued to lay the foundations for the Church of England, only to be arrested for treason on the orders of Mary I and burnt as a heretic. And what of Henry? After a lifelong struggle to give England an heir, his glorious successor was not a son, but a daughter. Elizabeth I, daughter of Henry and Anne Boleyn came to the throne in 1558 and ruled England for 45 years.

== Cast ==
- Ray Winstone as King Henry VIII
- Helena Bonham Carter as Anne Boleyn
- Joss Ackland as King Henry VII
- Sid Mitchell as the young Henry VIII
- Charles Dance as the Duke of Buckingham
- Mark Strong as the Duke of Norfolk
- Assumpta Serna as Catherine of Aragon
- Thomas Lockyer as Edward Seymour
- William Houston as Thomas Seymour
- David Suchet as Thomas Wolsey
- Danny Webb as Thomas Cromwell
- Scott Handy as Henry Percy
- Dominic Mafham as George Boleyn
- Benjamin Whitrow as Thomas Boleyn
- John Higgins as Robert Barnes
- Michael Maloney as Thomas Cranmer
- Lara Belmont as Mary Tudor
- Emilia Fox as Jane Seymour
- Sean Bean as Robert Aske
- Joseph Morgan as Thomas Culpeper
- Marsha Fitzalan as the Duchess of Norfolk
- Terence Harvey as Bishop Gardiner
- Kelly Hunter as Lady Rochford
- Pia Girard as Anne of Cleves
- Emily Blunt as Catherine Howard
- Tom Turner as Francis Dereham
- Clare Holman as Catherine Parr
- Hugh Mitchell as Edward VI
- David Gwillim as Physician
- Derek Jacobi as the Narrator (uncredited)

== Production ==
The serial was announced in 2001, with Alan Bleasdale as the writer. Granada Television's controller of drama Andy Harries could secure only £750,000 for each hour of Henry VIII from ITV, so had to attract co-production funding from other companies. He approached the American CBS network for the money. CBS executives wanted to replace Helena Bonham Carter with Sarah Michelle Gellar and dub all of the actors' voices with American accents. Harries declined CBS's funding and got the money from Powercorp, WGBH Boston and the Australian Broadcasting Corporation instead. The final budget was £5.2 million. Bleasdale had originally scripted an opening scene that featured Henry confronting the devil in hell. ITV's director of drama commissioning Nick Elliott told Harries, "I'm not having the devil on ITV. You'd better ring him and tell him I'm not paying £5 million to have the devil on ITV." Bleasdale then quit the project. He was replaced by Peter Morgan, who had written the Granada drama The Jury.

Filming took place at Pinewood Studios with exteriors filmed at Leeds Castle in Kent. Post-production took six months.

== Accolades ==
Year	Award	Category	Nominee	Result
2004	Fantasporto	Best Actress	Helena Bonham Carter	Won
2004	Zee Cine Awards	Best Actress	Helena Bonham Carter	Won
2004	Royal Television Craft & Design Award	Visual Effects – Special Effects	Lee Sheward	Nominated
2004	Television and Radio Industries Club Award	TV Drama Programme		Nominated
2004	International Emmy Award	Best TV Movie/Mini-series		Won
