= Durleigh =

Village in Somerset, England

Coordinates: 51.123°N 3.037°W

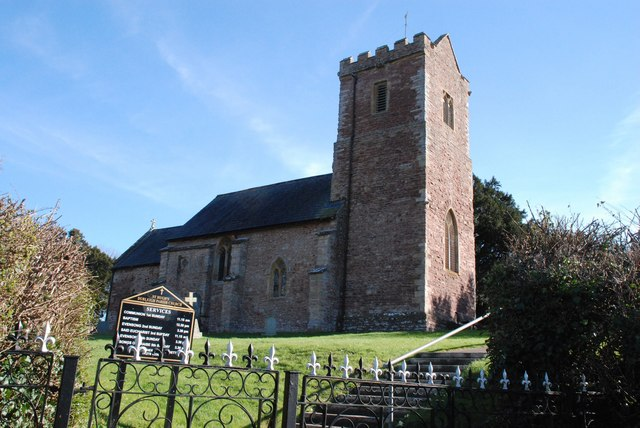
- Durleigh Church

- Location within Somerset
- Population: 548
- OS grid reference: ST275365
- Unitary authority: Somerset Council
- Ceremonial county: Somerset
- Region: South West
- Country: England
- Sovereign state: United Kingdom
- Post town: BRIDGWATER
- Postcode district: TA5, TA6
- Dialling code: 01278
- Police: Avon and Somerset
- Fire: Devon and Somerset
- Ambulance: South Western
- UK Parliament: Bridgwater

Durleigh is a village and civil parish on the outskirts of Bridgwater in Somerset, England. According to the 2011 Census, it had a population of 548. Its nearest town is Bridgwater, which lies approximately 1.6 miles (2.6 km) north-east from the village.

The village lies on Durleigh brook, a tributary of the River Parrett, which was dammed in 1938 to form Durleigh reservoir.

== History ==
The name Durleigh means wood frequented by deer.

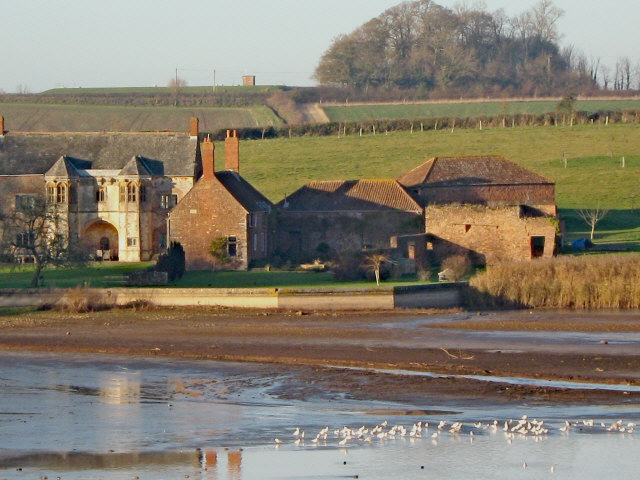
West Bower Manor

Durleigh was part of the hundred of Andersfield.

West Bower Manor (also known as Durleigh Manor) is all that remains of a large manorial property, the majority of which has been demolished. Parts of the building date from the 15th century though the core of the fabric may even be earlier, further parts were built in the 17th and 19th centuries. It was the seat of the historical estate of "West Bower" (Bower Delamere) once held by Edward Seymour, 1st Duke of Somerset, the brother of Jane Seymour, Henry VIII's Queen.

Eight people from the parish were accused of complicity in the Monmouth Rebellion of 1685.

== Governance ==
The parish council has responsibility for local issues, including setting an annual precept (local rate) to cover the council's operating costs and producing annual accounts for public scrutiny. The parish council evaluates local planning applications and works with the local police, district council officers, and neighbourhood watch groups on matters of crime, security, and traffic. The parish council's role also includes initiating projects for the maintenance and repair of parish facilities, as well as consulting with the district council on the maintenance, repair, and improvement of highways, drainage, footpaths, public transport, and street cleaning. Conservation matters (including trees and listed buildings) and environmental issues are also the responsibility of the council.

For local government purposes, since 1 April 2023, the village comes under the unitary authority of Somerset Council. Prior to this, it was part of the non-metropolitan district of Sedgemoor, which was formed on 1 April 1974 under the Local Government Act 1972, having previously been part of Bridgwater Rural District.

It is also part of the Bridgwater county constituency represented in the House of Commons of the Parliament of the United Kingdom. It elects one Member of Parliament (MP) by the first past the post system of election, and was part of the South West England constituency of the European Parliament prior to Britain leaving the European Union in January 2020, which elected seven MEPs using the d'Hondt method of party-list proportional representation.

== Religious sites ==
Durleigh Church dates from the 11th century but was substantially rebuilt in the late 19th century. It has been designated by English Heritage as a Grade II* listed building.
