= Church of St Hugh, Durleigh =

Church in Somerset, England

Church of St Hugh
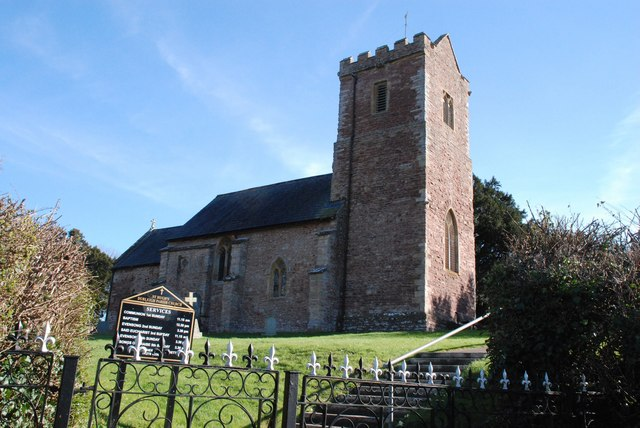

- Location within Somerset
- 51.1199°N 3.0375°W -->
- Location: XXXX, Somerset, England

Listed Building – Grade II*
- Official name: Durleigh Church
- Designated: 29 March 1963
- Reference no.: 1177147

The Church of St Hugh at Durleigh in the English county of Somerset was built in the 11th century. It is a Grade II* listed building.

== History ==
The building was first constructed in the 11th century and then revised and restored in the 14th and 15th centuries. It underwent Victorian restoration in the late 19th century.

The parish is part of the benefice of Bridgwater Holy Trinity and Durleigh Saint Hugh within the Diocese of Bath and Wells.

== Architecture ==
The stone church consists of a two-bay nave and a chancel. The two-stage tower dates from the 14th century. The tower has six bells.

Inside the church is a 15th century octagonal font.

== See also ==
- List of ecclesiastical parishes in the Diocese of Bath and Wells
