= Henry VIII and His Six Wives =

- Original British quad poster
- Directed by: Waris Hussein
- Written by: Ian Thorne
- Produced by: Roy Baird; Mark Shivas
- Starring: Keith Michell; Donald Pleasence; Charlotte Rampling; Jane Asher; Lynne Frederick
- Cinematography: Peter Suschitzky
- Edited by: John Bloom
- Music by: David Munrow
- Production company: BBC
- Distributed by: Anglo-EMI
- Release date: 13 July 1972 (UK)
- Running time: 125 min
- Country: United Kingdom
- Language: English

Henry VIII and His Six Wives is a 1972 British historical drama film directed by Waris Hussein, adapted from the 1970 miniseries, The Six Wives of Henry VIII. Keith Michell, who plays Henry VIII in the TV series, reprised his role. His six wives are portrayed by Frances Cuka, Charlotte Rampling, Jane Asher, Jenny Bos, Lynne Frederick, and Barbara Leigh-Hunt. Donald Pleasence portrays Thomas Cromwell and Bernard Hepton portrays Archbishop Thomas Cranmer, a role he had also played in the miniseries and briefly in its follow-up Elizabeth R.

== Plot ==
On his deathbed, Henry VIII reflects upon his long reign, and especially the crucial part his six marriages have played. The bulk of the film is depicted in flashback, while the dying Henry is surrounded by his family and courtiers.

Henry's first queen is the Spanish princess Catherine of Aragon. The young pair are in the midst of celebrating the birth of their son, only to be told that he has died. Henry and Catherine mourn their child together, and hope for another soon. Many years pass, during which time Catherine only produces one living daughter, Mary. Henry confides to Thomas More that he fears the marriage is cursed by God, as Catherine was previously wed to Henry's late older brother, Arthur, although Catherine proclaimed the marriage was not consummated.

Henry woos Anne Boleyn, a lady at court, who refuses to sleep with him unless she is his wife. Henry presses the Vatican to annul his marriage to Catherine. When that fails, he has Cardinal Thomas Wolsey removed from office and himself made head of the new Church of England. The marriage annulled, Catherine is sent away from court, and Anne is crowned the new queen. Anne also fails to produce a male heir, giving birth to a daughter, Elizabeth. Henry loses interest in Anne and starts courting Jane Seymour, another lady of the court. Thomas Cromwell, protégé of Cardinal Wolsey, observes Henry's interest in Jane and assists him by presenting a false case of Anne's infidelity with various men of the court, including her own brother, George Boleyn. Anne is beheaded in the Tower of London.

Henry marries Jane Seymour, who successfully returns Princess Mary to royal favour and has opinions on the matter of religion, asking for pardons for the participants of the Pilgrimage of Grace. Jane gives birth to Henry's long-sought male heir, Edward, but she dies soon after.

Henry's courtiers advise him to marry again for diplomatic reasons, with Cromwell pushing for the German Protestant Anne of Cleves, of whose portrait Henry approves. However, when she arrives Henry is disappointed that her appearance does not match the image. After a reluctant wedding, he arranges an annulment. Cromwell, a self-made man whose acquisition of power, wealth and titles have angered his aristocratic rivals, falls from power and is arrested at the Privy Council.

At court, Henry is drawn to Catherine Howard, young cousin of Anne Boleyn. Catherine is flattered by Henry's attention. Her uncle, Thomas Howard, Duke of Norfolk, urges her to return his affections. Henry and Catherine marry, with Henry lavishing her with many gifts and jewels. Archbishop Thomas Cranmer discovers that Catherine has had liaisons before her marriage, and presents this knowledge to Henry, who initially disbelieves the charges. Cranmer secures a confession from Catherine, who also admits an affair with Thomas Culpeper during her marriage to Henry. Catherine is beheaded.

Henry, now elderly, approaches Catherine Parr, a widow from two previous marriages. Catherine is reluctant, citing her religious views which differ from Henry's, but Henry admits his need for companionship in his old age. The pair marry, and Catherine becomes a loving stepmother to the royal children Mary, Elizabeth, and Edward.

At the end of the flashbacks, Catherine Parr is shown waiting by Henry's beside with Princess Mary. Archbishop Cranmer is summoned for Henry's final confession, and Henry dies holding his hand. All assembled kneel, praying for Henry’s soul on command of Cranmer, and Edward Seymour leads Prince Edward and Princess Elizabeth away, comforting them as they go.

== Main cast ==
- Keith Michell as Henry VIII
- Frances Cuka as Catherine of Aragon
- Charlotte Rampling as Anne Boleyn
- Jane Asher as Jane Seymour
- Jenny Bos as Anne of Cleves
- Lynne Frederick as Catherine Howard
- Barbara Leigh-Hunt as Catherine Parr
- Donald Pleasence as Thomas Cromwell
- Brian Blessed as the Duke of Suffolk
- Bernard Hepton as Thomas Cranmer
- Michael Gough as the Duke of Norfolk
- Michael Goodliffe as Sir Thomas More
- John Bryans as Cardinal Thomas Wolsey
- Michael Byrne as Edward Seymour
- Peter Madden as John Fisher
- Garfield Morgan as Stephen Gardiner
- Richard Warner as William Warham

== Production ==
After the success of Keith Michell's performance in the original BBC series, which focused on the individual wives, it was decided to make a feature film from Henry VIII's point of view. Nat Cohen asked Mark Shivas to produce the film, and John Bloomfield returned to design the costumes for the new production.

Waris Hussein was offered the job of directing. He was unsure what "to do that hasn't already been done... especially as Keith Michell was gonna play the lead" but felt "it's very hard to just turn something like that down because it's one of my favourite periods in history." He and the writer decided to approach the story "on a psychological basis. Who was this man? What was he capable of? What was his big problem? Big problem was that he couldn't have sons... So this whole thing of feeling betrayed by up there, by the people around him and trying to keep himself together when he's got the ability to destroy? That's what we made. Yeah. And it kind of worked."

=== Locations ===
- Hatfield House Old Palace, Park & River Lea flowing through the park, Hatfield, Hertfordshire, England, UK used in scenes featuring Anne Boleyn & Catherine Howard
- Woburn Abbey, Woburn, Bedfordshire, England, UK
- Allington Castle, Maidstone, Kent, England, UK used in scenes featuring Anne Boleyn
- Eton College, Eton, Berkshire, England, UK used as Hampton Court and as Tower Green in execution scenes
- EMI-MGM Elstree Studios, Borehamwood, Hertfordshire, England, UK

A playing field at St. Neot's Preparatory School in Eversley, Hampshire was also used as a shooting location.

== Release ==
The film was given a royal premiere. Hussein recalled, "It was very funny because I deliberately put on my Nehru jacket and presented myself as an all Indian director."
