= Durleigh reservoir =

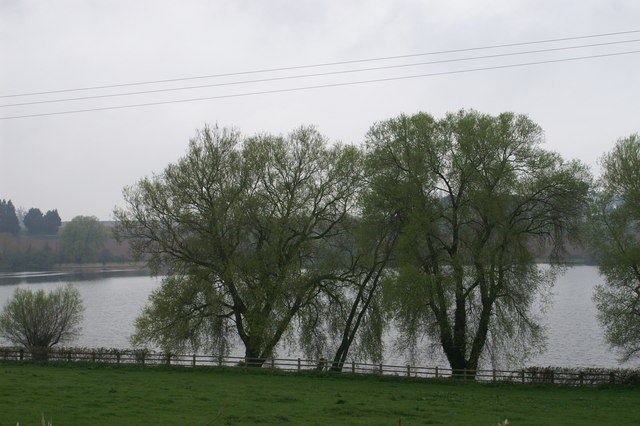

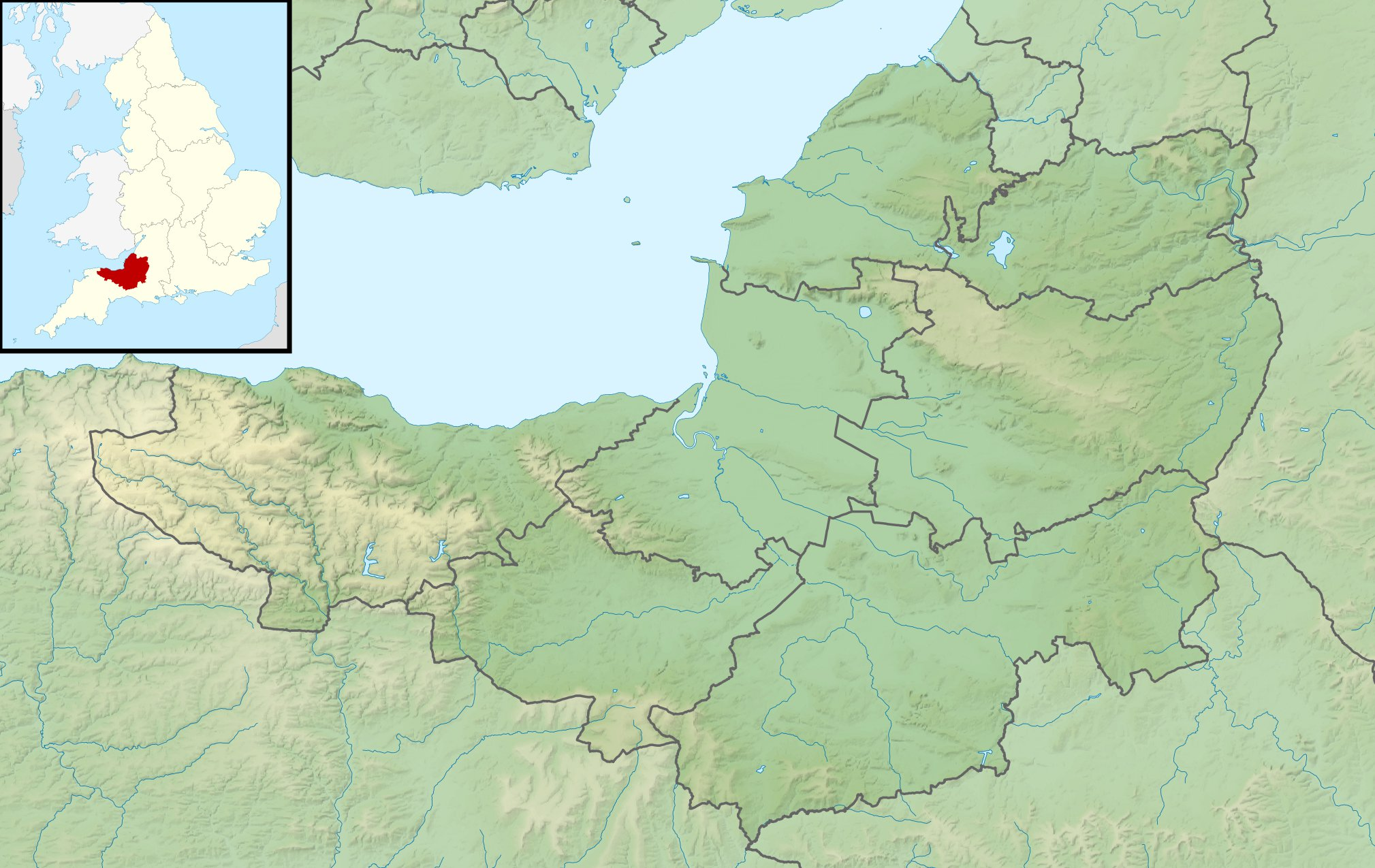
- Location within Somerset
- Location: Somerset
- Coordinates: 51°07′16″N 3°02′42″W
- Type: reservoir
- Primary inflows: Durleigh Brook
- Basin countries: United Kingdom
- Built: 1938
- Surface area: 80 acres (32 ha)

Durleigh reservoir at Durleigh in Somerset, England covers 80 acres (32 ha) and was formed in 1938 when Durleigh brook, a tributary of the River Parrett, was dammed.

The reservoir's original purpose was to provide water for the newly built British Cellophane Factory in Bridgwater.

It is used for coarse fishing, particularly carp, roach, bream, perch, tench and pike.

The reservoir provides facilities for dinghy sailing, sailboarding and windsurfing through Durleigh Sailing Club.

The wildlife includes several bird species including: ducks, great crested grebes, swans and geese.

West Bower Manor (also known as Durleigh Manor), which stands on the shore of the reservoir, is all that remains of a large manorial property, the majority of which has been demolished. Parts of the building date from the 15th century though the core of the fabric may even be earlier, further parts were built in the 17th and 19th centuries.

The principal surviving element from the Medieval manor is the gatehouse. This has been extensively restored, but is a good example of a former courtyard gatehouse with a pair of faceted turrets on either side of the former entrance passageway.
