= Agnes Howard, Duchess of Norfolk =

English noblewoman

Her Grace The Duchess of Norfolk
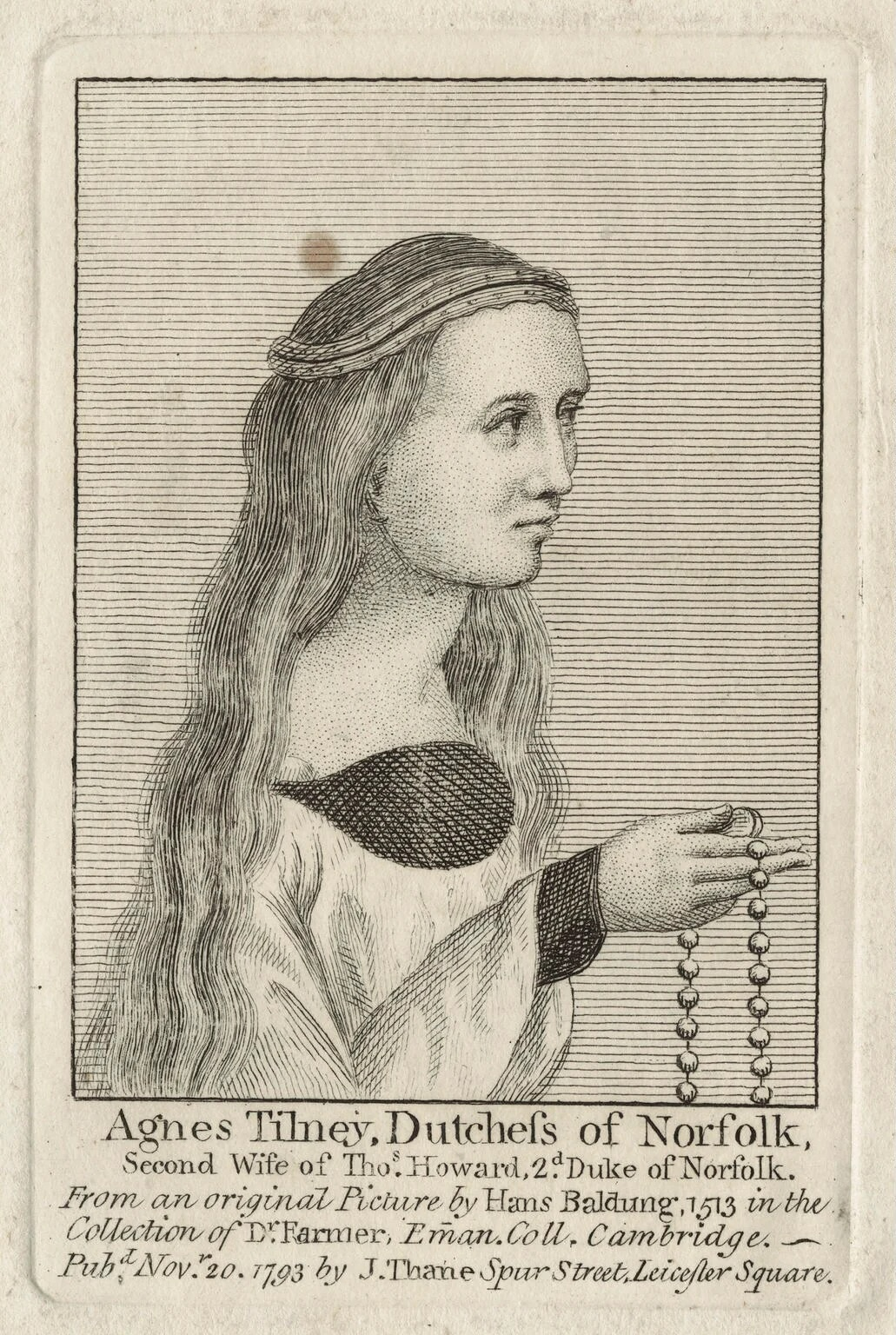
- Born: c. 1477
- Died: May 1545
- Spouse: Thomas Howard, 2nd Duke of Norfolk
- Issue: William Howard, 1st Baron Howard of Effingham; Lord Thomas Howard; Lord Richard Howard; Dorothy Stanley, Countess of Derby; Anne de Vere, Countess of Oxford; Katherine Daubeney, Countess of Bridgewater; Lady Elizabeth Radclyffe
- Father: Hugh Tilney
- Mother: Eleanor Tailboys

Agnes Howard, Duchess of Norfolk (née Tilney; c. 1477 – May 1545) was the second wife of Thomas Howard, 2nd Duke of Norfolk. Two of King Henry VIII's wives were her step-granddaughters, Anne Boleyn and Catherine Howard. Catherine Howard was placed in the Duchess's care after her mother's death.

Agnes' brother, Sir Philip Tilney of Shelley (d. 1533), was the paternal grandfather of Edmund Tilney (1535/6–1610), Master of the Revels to Elizabeth I and James VI and I. Edmund Tilney's mother, Malyn, was implicated in the scandal surrounding the downfall of Catherine Howard.

== Marriage ==
Agnes Tilney, born around 1477, was the daughter of Hugh Tilney of Skirbeck and Boston, Lincolnshire, by Eleanor, daughter of Walter Tailboys and Alice Stafford Cheyney. Her brother, Sir Philip Tilney of Shelley (d.1533), was in the service of Thomas Howard, then Earl of Surrey, the husband of Agnes' cousin, Elizabeth Tilney. Surrey's first wife died on 4 April 1497, and he and Agnes were married four months later by dispensation dated 17 August 1497. Agnes brought Surrey little by way of dowry.

The marriage coincided with a change in Surrey's fortunes. As a supporter of Richard III, for whom he fought at Bosworth in 1485, Surrey was not in high favour during the early years of the reign of Henry VII. However, in 1499 he was recalled to court, and in the following year he accompanied the King on a state visit to France. In 1501 he was sworn of the Privy Council, and on 16 June of that year was named Lord Treasurer. In the same year he was involved in successful diplomatic negotiations with King Ferdinand and Queen Isabella for a marriage between the Spanish Infanta, Katherine of Aragon, and Henry VII's eldest son Arthur, Prince of Wales. When Prince Arthur died on 2 April 1502, Surrey supervised the funeral.

In 1503 he escorted the King's daughter, Margaret Tudor, to Scotland for her wedding to King James IV. Agnes Howard, and her step-daughter Muriel, Lady Gray, clipped the Scottish king's beard on 9 August 1503, and he gave her a length of cloth-of-gold.

On 21 April 1509 Henry VII died. Surrey was an executor of the late King's will, and served as Earl Marshal at the coronation of Henry VIII. When a Scottish army invaded after Henry VIII had departed for Calais on 30 June 1513, Surrey crushed the Scottish forces at Flodden on 9 September. The victory brought Surrey popular renown and royal rewards. On 1 February 1514 he was created Duke of Norfolk, and his son Thomas was made Earl of Surrey. Both were granted lands and annuities, and the Howard arms were augmented in honour of Flodden.

Norfolk's leading position among the nobility was reflected in the Duchess's role at court. She served as lady-in-waiting to Catherine of Aragon for sixteen years, was godmother to Princess Mary, and attended the Princess during a visit to France in 1520. Katherine of Aragon, the wife of Henry VIII, gave her a pendant shaped like the letter "A" set with diamonds and pearls as a New Year's day gift.

By the spring of 1522 Norfolk was almost 80 years of age and in failing health. He retired to his ducal castle at Framlingham in Suffolk where he died on 21 May 1524. His funeral and burial on 22 June at Thetford Priory were said to have been 'spectacular and enormously expensive', befitting the richest and most powerful peer in England.

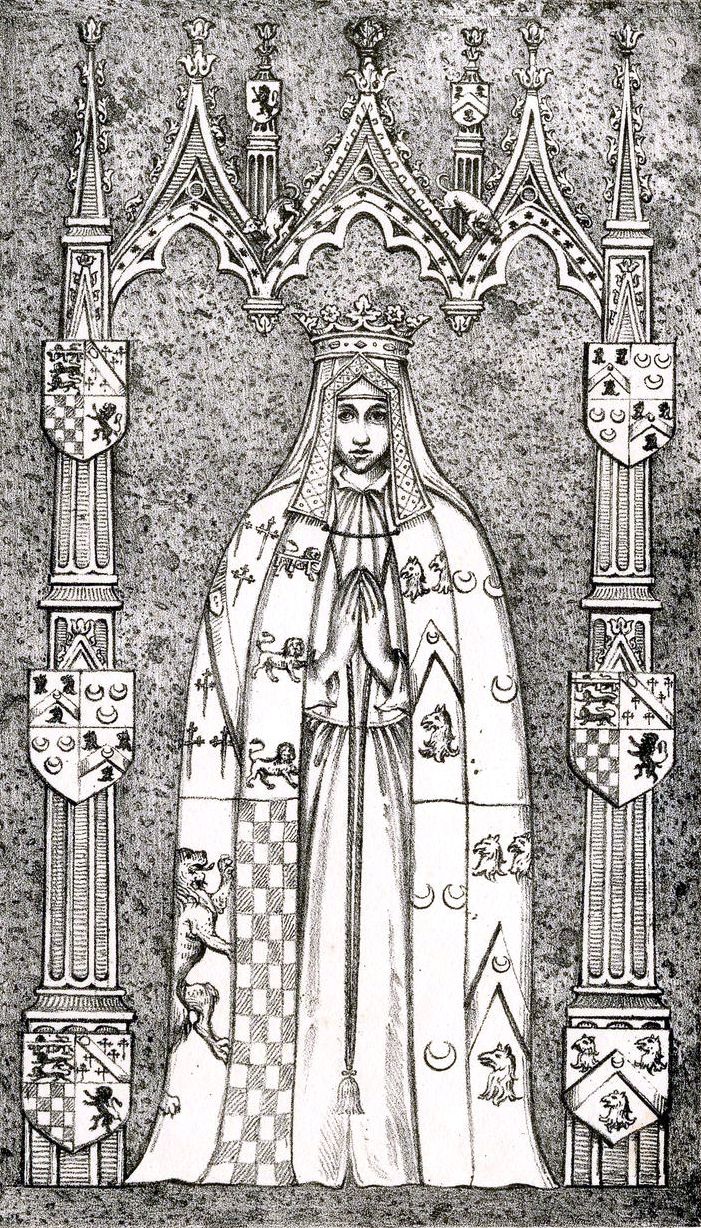
Sketch of the tomb of Agnes Howard, Duchess of Norfolk.

== Dowager Duchess ==
The Dowager Duchess remained in favour after her husband's death. Ordinances issued at Eltham in 1526 indicate that she was accorded first place in the Queen's household after the King's sister Mary Tudor.

On 23 May 1533 Archbishop Thomas Cranmer declared Henry VIII's marriage to his first Queen, Katherine of Aragon, a nullity. On or about 25 January 1533 the King had already married the Dowager Duchess's step-granddaughter Anne Boleyn in a secret ceremony. Anne was crowned Queen on 1 June 1533. The Dowager Duchess bore Anne's train in the coronation procession, and was godmother at the christening of Anne's daughter, Princess Elizabeth. Anne's two subsequent miscarriages caused the King misgivings about the marriage. A possible cause of Anne's downfall perhaps came about as a result of her conflict with the King's chief minister, Thomas Cromwell, over the distribution of the spoils from the dissolution of the monasteries. Anne was charged with adultery and high treason, and on 19 May 1536 was beheaded at Tower Green.

The King then took Jane Seymour as his third wife. Two years after her death, at Cromwell's instigation the King wed Anne of Cleves on 6 January 1540. However the King's physical revulsion for his new bride led to a speedy annulment of the marriage by Act of Parliament on 12 July 1540. By then Katherine Howard, another of the Dowager Duchess's step-granddaughters, had already caught the King's eye. Henry and Katherine were married at a private ceremony at Oatlands on 28 July 1540.

According to Agnes Strickland, Agnes Tilney, Duchess of Norfolk was a Great Lady of the Queen's Household to Katherine Howard.

Despite the fact that Henry was much in love with her, referring to her as his "rose without a thorn", the marriage quickly came to a disastrous end. While the King and Queen were on progress during the fall of 1541, the religious reformer John Lassells and his sister Mary Hall told Archbishop Cranmer of the Queen's sexual indiscretions with her music master, Henry Manox, and a Howard kinsman, Francis Dereham, while she had been a young girl living in the Dowager Duchess's household at Lambeth.

On 1 November 1541 Cranmer revealed these matters in a letter to the King. The King immediately ordered that the Queen be confined to her apartments, and never saw her again. The Dowager Duchess, hearing reports of what had happened while Katherine had been under her lax guardianship, reasoned that 'If there be none offence sithence the marriage, she cannot die for that was done before'. Unfortunately for the Queen and the Dowager Duchess, further investigations by Cranmer and the Council revealed that with the connivance of one of her attendants, Lady Rochford, Katherine had allegedly had an affair with Thomas Culpeper, one of the King's favourite gentlemen of the privy chamber, after her marriage to the King.

Dereham, Manox, and other members of the Dowager Duchess's household were arrested and interrogated by the Council. Her stepson, the Duke of Norfolk, was sent to search her house at Lambeth and question members of the household. They revealed that the Duchess had attempted to destroy evidence by burning the papers of Dereham and his friend William Damport. The Duchess was sent to the Tower. Towards the end of November she was questioned by the Council, but could add little to what was already known by her interrogators. On 1 December Dereham and Culpeper were arraigned on charges of treason. Both were convicted at trial, and sentenced to death. Dereham and his friend William Damport were tortured in an attempt to wring confessions from them concerning Queen Katherine's alleged adultery, and on 10 December 1541 Dereham and Culpeper were executed at Tyburn. On the same day the Dowager Duchess was again questioned, and admitted to having promoted her niece as a prospective bride for the King while having knowledge of her prior misconduct, to having persuaded the Queen to take Dereham into her service, and to having burned Dereham's letters.

By mid-December the Dowager Duchess's eldest son, William Howard, his wife, and the Duchess's daughter Anne Howard were committed to the Tower. About the same time another of the Duchess's daughters, Katherine Daubeney, Lady Bridgewater was also arrested. On 14 December 1541, Norfolk, fearful for his own safety, denounced his stepmother and kin in a letter to the King. On 22 December William Howard and his wife, and a number of servants who had been witnesses to the Queen's misconduct, including Malyn Tilney (mother of Edmund Tilney, future Master of the Revels to Queen Elizabeth), were arraigned for misprision of treason 'for concealing the evil demeanour of the Queen, to the slander of the King and his succession'. All were sentenced to life imprisonment and loss of goods, although most were pardoned after Queen Katherine's execution. The Dowager Duchess, although included in the indictment, was not brought to trial as she was 'old and testy', and 'may die out of perversity to defraud the King's Highness of the confiscation of her goods', but like the others she was sentenced to imprisonment and forfeiture of lands and goods.

On 6 February 1542 a bill of attainder against Queen Katherine and Lady Rochford received final reading, and on 13 February 1542 the Queen and Lady Rochford were beheaded on Tower Green. The King was of the view that there was as much reason to convict the Dowager Duchess of treason as there had been to convict Dereham. However the Council urged leniency, and she was eventually released from the Tower on 5 May 1542. Her stepson, the Duke of Norfolk, escaped punishment, but was never fully trusted again by the King.

== Death ==
The Dowager Duchess died in May 1545 and on 13 October was interred at St. Mary's Church in Lambeth, Surrey, where four of her sons who had died young--John, Charles, Henry, and Richard--were buried. Her husband's tomb at Thetford St. Mary's Priory Church was removed by his son after the dissolution of that house in 1537, and may have been moved to Lambeth, but no trace of his or Agnes's tomb were to be found when John Aubrey visited there in the 1690s. The church itself was substantially rebuilt.

== Issue ==
- William Howard, 1st Baron Howard of Effingham
- Lord Thomas Howard (1511–1537)
- John Howard (d. 23 March 1503)
- Charles Howard (d. 3 May 1512)
- Henry Howard (d. 22 February 1513)
- Lord Richard Howard (d.1517)
- Lady Dorothy Howard, married Edward Stanley, 3rd Earl of Derby
- Lady Anne Howard, married John de Vere, 14th Earl of Oxford
- Lady Katherine Howard (d.1554), married firstly Rhys ap Gruffydd, and secondly Henry Daubeney, 1st Earl of Bridgewater (d.1548).
- Lady Elizabeth Howard (d. 1536), married Henry Radclyffe, 2nd Earl of Sussex.
