= Henry Mannox =

English Member of Parliament (1526–1564)

Henry Mannox (also spelled Mannock or Manox) (by 1526 – 1564) of London, Haddenham, Cambridgeshire and Hemingford Grey, Huntingdonshire was an English Member of Parliament for Huntingdonshire.

== Life ==
He was a Justice of the peace for Surrey in 1547, and a Member of Parliament for Huntingdonshire in 1554–1558/1559. Among his other offices, he was the escheator for Cambridgeshire and Huntingdonshire in 1560–1561, commissioner chantries for the same counties in 1548, surveyor, court augmentations, Huntingdonshire by 1552–1554, and a member of the Exchequer from 1554 until his death.

== Marriage ==
Margaret Mundy was the daughter of a London Alderman, and had previously been married twice. Her second husband was Lord Edmund Howard, whom she married after her first husband died in 1532, therefore making her Catherine Howard's step-mother.

Lady Margaret Howard and her third husband, Henry Mannox, owned together 10 acres of land that eventually turned into the location of Russell House in Balham, Streatham.

== Identity debate ==
It was Steinman who suggested that Margaret Mundy's third husband was the Henry Mannox who had been music master to Catherine Howard in her youth, and had been involved in sexual indiscretions with her which later contributed to her downfall. Since then this has been the subject of some debate.

Henry Mannox was the music teacher of Henry VIII's 5th wife, Catherine Howard, when she was young. They became romantically involved, but not going as far as having a sexual relationship. When she became Queen, unlike Joan Bulmer, Katherine Tylney, Francis Dereham and others from the Dowager Duchess of Norfolk's household, he did not receive an appointment in her household, nor seemed to seek one, but later became involved in the scandal of her downfall and gave evidence in the inquiry against her. His life was spared because of this and because there was no evidence that their relationship continued after her marriage.

Gareth Russell, in Young and Damned and Fair writes that his surname was spelled in a variety of ways: Mannox, Manox or Mannock. Alison Weir spells the name Manock or Manox.

Josephine Wilkinson, another biographer of Catherine Howard, writes in Catherine Howard: The Tragic Story of Henry VIII's Fifth Queen that:

Henry Mannock was a younger son of George Mannock of Giffords Hall, Stoke-by-Nayland in Suffolk, very close to the Duke of Norfolk's estate at Tendring Hall. Far from being a menial brought into the duchess's household to help out, Mannock was a Howard retainer. How he came to be engaged as Catherine's music teacher is uncertain; that he was known to Norfolk was undoubtedly in his favour; that he was a cousin of Edward Waldegrave, who was already in the duchess's employ, gave him further advantage. Mannock was well connected

When scandal struck in 1541, he was married. Catherine's uncle and Edmund's brother, Lord William Howard, called 'on him and his wife at their own door' shortly before Catherine's affair with Francis Dereham ended.

Henry Mannox or Mannock and a Mr. Barnes had been appointed Catherine Howard's music teachers in 1536, to teach her to play the virginals. Henry Mannox and Catherine Howard were of an age. It was in the execution of these duties that he fell in love with his pupil and would 'many times' fall into 'familiarity' with her; for, as he believed, 'she hath shown to be of like inclination towards him'.

In Catherine Howard's own words: 'First, at the flattering and fair persuasions of Mannock being but a young girl I suffered him at sundry times to handle and touch the secret parts of my body which neither became me with honesty to permit nor him to require.'

Their affair lasted until some lewd remarks of his reached back to Catherine through household gossip. 'All her life,' Gareth Russell writes, 'Catherine hated to be humiliated and reacted strongly when faced with disrespect or embarrassment.' A few days later the two could be seen walking around in the orchard at Norfolk House. Josephine Wilkinson writes, 'Catherine had a kindness of heart and a lack of malice that prevented her from remaining angry with anyone for very long'.

Henry Mannox left the Duchess Dowager's service and worked for Lord Bayment. 'Interestingly,' writes Conor Byrne, 'Manox may have later married Margaret Munday, widow of Catherine's father Edmund. His wife, Catherine's stepmother, had a negative or ‘unnatural’ opinion of him, perhaps because she blamed him'.

The scandal surrounding Catherine Howard broke in 1541, and one of the civil servants who were to be instrumental to her fate spoke to Mannock. Mannock's life had changed after his fellow servants' ire over the affair with Catherine.

His honesty impressed interrogators and later biographers alike when 'he confessed upon his damnation that he never knew Catherine carnally.'

Parliament of England
Preceded by Sir Robert Tyrwhitt; Thomas Cotton	Member of Parliament for Huntingdonshire; Nov. 1554; With: William Lawrence	Succeeded by Thomas Maria Wingfield; William Mallory
