= Thomas Culpeper =

English courtier

Thomas Culpeper (c. 1514 – 10 December 1541) was an English courtier and close friend of King Henry VIII, and was related to two of his queens, Anne Boleyn and Catherine Howard. He is known to have had many private meetings with Catherine during her marriage, though these may have involved political intrigue rather than sex. A letter to him was found, written by Queen Catherine and signed, "Yours as long as life endures." Accused of adultery with Henry's young consort, Culpeper denied it and blamed the Queen for the situation, saying that he had tried to end his friendship with her, but that she was "dying of love for him". Eventually, Culpeper admitted that he intended to sleep with the queen, though he never admitted to having actually done so. After being convicted of treason, Culpeper was executed by beheading in December 1541.

== Early life ==
Thomas Culpeper was the second of the three sons of Alexander Culpeper (died 1541) of Bedgebury in Kent, and his second wife, Constance Harper. His elder brother, also named Thomas, was a client of Thomas Cromwell. The brothers were known for collecting valuable items for the royal family during their time at court. He was distantly related to the Howard family, who were immensely powerful at the time, being a distant cousin of Joyce Culpeper, Catherine Howard's mother by their shared descent from Thomas Culpeper of Brenchley and Bayhall. (died 1321).

This made Culpeper and Catherine Howard sixth cousins, once removed. Catherine and Culpeper were also third cousins once removed through Edmund's link to Thomas Culpeper's mother.

== Royal service ==
Having bought the Higham Park estate at Bridge in Kent in 1534, by 1535 Culpeper was acting for Viscount Lisle and his wife, Honor, during which time he collected a number of items for them. In 1538, Honor presented Culpeper with a hawk and during that same year, Culpeper worked with Richard Cromwell to obtain a hawk for King Henry VIII.

Culpeper was described as "a beautiful youth" and he was a great favourite of Henry. Culpeper had major influence with the King and was often bribed to use his influence on others' behalf. In 1539, a Thomas Culpeper was accused of raping a park-keeper's wife and then murdering a villager. However, there is a possibility that the rapist was Culpeper's elder brother, also called Thomas. Due to similar names, some confusion between the brothers is possible. However, his elder brother Thomas (born around 1501), may have received a knighthood, as referenced on the Culpeper family tree. Whoever was the guilty party, through influence on the King, a pardon was given. Culpeper was given the honour of being keeper of the armoury and Henry eventually made Culpeper a Gentleman of the Privy Chamber, giving him intimate access to the King, as the role involved dressing and undressing Henry and often sleeping in his bedchamber. He was part of the group of privileged courtiers who greeted Henry's fourth wife Anne of Cleves when she arrived in England for her marriage.

From 1537 to 1541, Culpeper was given several gifts, including the office of keeper of the manor at Penshurst Palace and property in Kent, Essex, Gloucestershire, and Wiltshire.

== Supposed affair with Catherine Howard ==
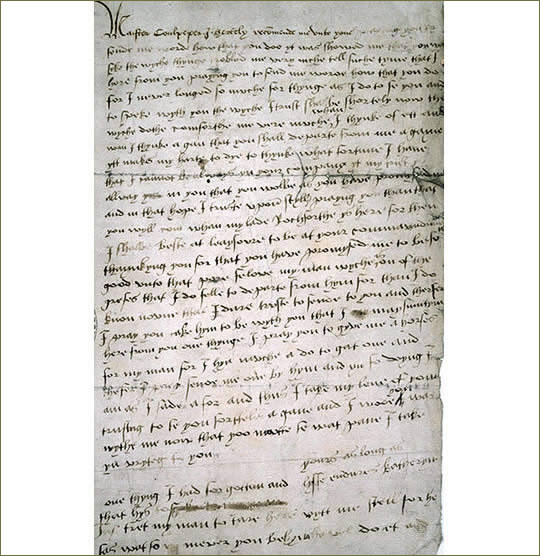
Catherine Howard's letter to Culpeper

In 1540, Culpeper caught the attention of Henry's young new bride, Catherine Howard, and by 1541 they were spending time together, often alone and late at night, aided and abetted by Catherine's lady-in-waiting, Lady Rochford, the widowed sister-in-law of Anne Boleyn. Culpeper had access to the Queen's apartments and often came into contact with the Queen and her attendants. In March 1541 Henry went to Dover and left Catherine behind at Greenwich. At this time Culpeper began asking favours of Catherine. The private meetings between them are thought to have begun sometime around May of that same year. On these occasions only Lady Rochford and another lady-in-waiting, Katherine Tilney, were allowed entrance to the Queen's chamber.

On 30 June, Catherine and Henry travelled north on progress with the intention of meeting King James V of Scotland at York. They arrived at Lincoln on 9 August, where Culpeper met Catherine for another secret meeting in her bedchamber. These meetings continued in Pontefract Castle, after the court arrived there on 23 August. It is believed that the letter Catherine sent to Culpeper was sent at this time. In this letter she wished to know how he was, and is troubled that he is ill. Catherine also wrote: "I never longed so muche for [a] thynge as I do to se you and to speke wyth you, the wyche I trust shal be shortely now," and "my trust ys allway in you that you wolbe as you have promysed me..."

These statements cause some to believe that their affair was not only one of passion, but also centred on Culpeper's political agenda. With Henry in poor health and only his young son Prince Edward to succeed him; being Catherine's favourite would undoubtedly have put Culpeper in a very strong political position. As a well-liked member of the King's privy chamber he enjoyed a close relationship with Henry. If the promise Catherine mentioned was in reference to his possible knowledge about her previous sexual relationships, Culpeper could have used this as leverage to gain power and control over the Queen herself. In this specific letter Catherine states that she longs to talk with Culpeper but does not mention any desire to be intimate with him, although she does sign off with the dedication, "Yours as long as life endures".

Accounts of the Queen's premarital indiscretions had meanwhile come to the attention of Thomas Cranmer, then Archbishop of Canterbury. During Cranmer's investigations, he came across rumours of an affair between the Queen and Culpeper; Culpeper was soon arrested for questioning. Both he and the Queen denied the allegations, but the letter from Catherine to Culpeper, found during a search of Culpeper's rooms, provided the evidence for which Cranmer was looking. Whether the association between Culpeper and the Queen was ever consummated is still debated by historians, but the letter seems to give evidence of Catherine's feelings for Culpeper. Also in the letter was a reference to Lady Rochford.

The act of Parliament authorising the executions is the Bill of Atteynder of Mestres Katherin Hawarde late Quene of England, the Royal Assent by Commission Act 1541 (33 Hen. 8. c. 21). This says that,

"the Quene brought to passe that the said Culpepper and she mett in a secrett and vyle place, and that at an undue hower of xj [eleven] a Clocke in the night, and so remayned there with him till three of the clocke in the morninge, [and] ... afterward most falselie and traiterouselye comytted and perpetrated many detestable and adhomynable treasons..." Statutes of the Realm Vol 3 (1509-47) p. 919.

== Downfall and execution ==
Culpeper was arrested on orders from King Henry and, in December 1541, was tried for adultery alongside Francis Dereham, who was separately accused of adultery with the Queen before her marriage to Henry. Catherine had not hidden the affair with Culpeper from members of her household, who now testified against her.

The Queen was portrayed as having seduced Culpeper at Chenies Palace in Buckinghamshire. With testimony given of private meetings at Hatfield House in Hertfordshire, and during the royal progress to the north of England, his fate was sealed.

Under interrogation, Culpeper admitted to intending to have sexual relations with Catherine and that she intended to sleep with him. Lady Rochford, however, stated in her interrogation that she believed that Culpeper had "known the Queen carnally."

Both Culpeper and Dereham were found guilty and sentenced to death. They were both to be hanged, drawn and quartered. Both men pleaded for mercy; Culpeper, presumably because of his former closeness to the King, received a commuted sentence of simple beheading. Dereham did not.

Culpeper was executed along with Dereham at Tyburn on 10 December 1541, aged approximately 27. Their heads were put on display on London Bridge. Culpeper was buried at St Sepulchre-without-Newgate church in London. Queen Catherine and Lady Rochford were both executed on 13 February 1542, and were buried in the Church of St Peter ad Vincula, within the Tower of London.

== Portrayal ==
Culpeper is referenced in nearly all biographies of Henry VIII and Catherine Howard. He is less well-represented in popular fiction, where he is often unrepresented except for his relationship with Catherine.

=== Literature ===
In Ford Madox Ford's trilogy on Catherine Howard, entitled The Fifth Queen, Culpeper is portrayed as an intimate of Catherine's who, early on in the novel, arrives with her in tow on a mule as the wedding with Anne of Cleves is about to take place. In dragging the mule forward as a riot is starting outside the King's garden, he is described as "a man in green at the mule's head, [who] ... sprang like a wild cat under the beast's neck. His face blazed white, his teeth shone like a dog's, he screamed and struck his dagger through the butcher's throat [someone trying to block his and Catherine's way]. His motions were those of a wild beast". His introduction to court is brought about through Catherine. He is sent to Calais to keep him from getting in trouble at Court for his brawling. He is often mentioned as having sold property to buy his impoverished cousin Catherine a proper dress and is not at all consistent with the historical record.

Culpeper features in Philippa Gregory's novel The Boyeln Inheritance.

=== Onscreen portrayals ===
- Robert Donat (The Private Life of Henry VIII, 1933 film)
- Ralph Bates (The Six Wives of Henry VIII, 1970 BBC miniseries)
- Robin Sachs (Henry VIII and His Six Wives, 1972 film)
- Joseph Morgan (Henry VIII, 2003 TV film)
- Torrance Coombs (The Tudors, Showtime series): here, he is characterised as a lustful, violent, arrogant young man whose interest in Catherine is purely sexual; their relationship is facilitated by a pre-existing affair with Lady Rochford, something with no known historical basis.
