= Francis Dereham =

English courtier

Francis Dereham (c. 1506/09 – executed 10 December 1541) was a Tudor courtier whose involvement with Henry VIII's fifth Queen, Catherine Howard, in her youth, prior to engagement with the king, was eventually found out and led to his arrest. The information of Dereham having a relationship with Howard displeased King Henry to such great lengths he arranged the executions of all involved.

== Early life ==
Francis Dereham (b. 1506/09 - d. 1541) was the son of Thomas Dereham (b. 1474 - d. 1531) of Crimplesham in Norfolk, and Isabel, the daughter of John Paynell, of Boothby in Lincolnshire and Elizabeth Tylney (da. of Sir Philip Tilney of Boston and Isabel Thorpe).

== Relationship with Catherine Howard ==
Dereham is known for his sexual indiscretions with Catherine Howard, the fifth wife of King Henry VIII of England. The relationship started in 1538, when Francis was 32 years old and Catherine was around 15, before she became queen. During their affair, Catherine and Francis both lived in the household of Agnes Howard, Dowager Duchess of Norfolk, 2nd wife of Thomas Howard, 2nd Duke of Norfolk, in Norfolk House in Lambeth. Francis Dereham's maternal grandmother, Elizabeth Tylney, was the aunt of both of Thomas Howard's wives (who were 1st cousins) making Francis and Catherine Howard 2nd cousins 1x removed.

Before getting involved with Catherine, Dereham was having an affair with Joan Bulmer, who lived in the same household. Dereham's relationship with Catherine came to an end when her music master, Henry Mannox, sent an anonymous letter to the Dowager Duchess. Mannox, who had started a sexual relationship with Catherine and molested her when she was 13, suggested that the Duchess should visit Catherine's bedroom "half an hour after" going to bed, adding that "you shall see that which shall displease you". As a result, Dereham was sent away and Catherine was told off for her "banqueting by night" because the Duchess feared "it would hurt her beauty". David Starkey has argued that the Duchess was more concerned about Catherine's looks than her morals. Dereham was forced to go to live in Ireland, where it is believed he resorted to piracy. Before he left, he asked Catherine to look after £100. This money was the bulk of his savings, and Catherine, when later Queen, said that he told her that if he did not return "I was to consider it as my own".

In late 1539, Catherine was made lady-in-waiting to the King's fourth wife, Anne of Cleves. Subsequently, Dereham was appointed as a secretary at Hampton Court, an appointment possibly engineered by the Dowager Duchess to silence him about Catherine's previous indiscretions. On 27 August 1541, using the Dowager Duchess as a reference, Dereham approached his former lover at Pontefract Castle, seeking employment while the court was still in progress. Queen Catherine made him her Private Secretary and then a Gentleman Usher of the Queen's Chamber. Dereham explained that if the King died, he would marry Catherine, boasting that he had been generously favoured. This arrogance, possibly intended to arouse the jealousy of Thomas Culpeper, caused some consternation at court. Dereham had a violent temper and, after getting drunk, he attacked John Fell, a Gentleman Usher of similar standing, who had questioned Dereham's pleasure at remaining seated after a Queen's Council meeting.

When their past relationship was brought to the attention of Archbishop Thomas Cranmer by a chamberer in the Dowager Duchess's household, Mary Lassells, he reported them to the King in a letter. This provoked an investigation that resulted in the arrests of the Dowager Duchess, her son William Howard, 1st Lord Howard of Effingham, Thomas Dereham (Francis' brother), Thomas Culpeper, Queen Catherine herself, and eventually Lady Rochford, one of Catherine's ladies-in-waiting. Under interrogation, Dereham admitted to a pre-marital relationship with Catherine, but claimed that they had never been intimate after Catherine's marriage. Furthermore, he maintained that he had been supplanted in her affections by Culpeper.

Cranmer was faced with the rumours of a pre-contract of marriage between Dereham and Catherine. Such a pre-contract would have been as binding as a marriage, especially if the couple had sealed the agreement with sexual relations. If this were the case, Catherine's marriage to the King would have been unlawful. However, no evidence exists to support this allegation; incriminating documents are thought to have been burned by the Dowager Duchess, as it is recorded that she raided Dereham's coffers and destroyed their letters. A supposed love letter from Catherine was used as evidence of her adultery. Dereham admitted, even under torture, only that there had been a pre-contract of marriage. Catherine admitted having sexual relations on many occasions with Dereham but claimed that they practised a method of birth control and, perhaps in her fear, blamed Dereham for forcing himself on her. When interrogated again, Dereham denied any post-marital intercourse, but claimed that Culpeper "had succeeded him in the Queen's affections".

== Execution ==
On 4 November 1541, Catherine was taken to Syon, where she was imprisoned. On 22 November it was announced that Catherine "had forfeited her honour and should be proceeded against by law, and was henceforth to be named no longer Queen, but only Catherine Howard".

On 1 December 1541, Thomas Culpeper and Francis Dereham were arraigned at Guildhall for treason and each sentenced to a traitor's death. Both men petitioned Henry VIII to commute their death to beheading, but only Culpeper was successful in his petition.

On 10 December 1541, Dereham died in the way customarily reserved for traitors at Tyburn, being hanged, drawn and quartered. Culpeper also died at Tyburn, but as he had been favoured by the King before his affair with Catherine, his sentence was commuted to beheading.

"Culpeper and Dereham were drawn from the Tower of London to Tyburn, and there Culpeper, after an exhortation made to the people to pray for him, he standing on the ground by the gallows, kneeled down and had his head stricken off; and then Dereham was hanged, membered, bowelled, headed, and quartered [and both] their heads set on London Bridge."

Catherine and Lady Rochford were beheaded at the Tower of London on 13 February 1542. The Dowager Duchess and Thomas Howard were eventually released.

== Notes ==
=== Primary sources ===
- Accounts of the Chamber and the Great Wardrobe, PRO
- Correspondence Politique de MM. De Castillon et de Marillac, ambassadeurs de France en Angleterre, 1537-42 (ed Jean Kaulek, Paris, 1885)
- Calendars of State Papers: Spanish
- Letters and Papers of the Reign of Henry VIII
- Edward Hall, The Triumphant Reign of Henry the Eighth, London 1547, 2 vols, ed. Charles Whibley and (T C Jack, London, 1904)
- Nicander Nucius, The Second Book of the Travels (ed. J A Cramer, Camden Society, London, 1841)

=== Secondary sources ===
- The visitation of Norfolk in the year 1563 By William Harvey, England. College of arms, Norfolk & Norwich Archeological Society
- Alison Weir, Henry VIII: King and Court, London, 2001
- Alison Weir, The Six Wives of Henry VIII, London, 1991
