= Isabel Leigh =

English lady-in-waiting (died 1573)

Isabel Leigh, Lady Stumpe (c. 1496 – 16 February 1573) was a lady-in-waiting during the reign of her younger half-sister, Katherine Howard, fifth wife and Queen Consort to Henry VIII.

== Early life ==
Isabel was the first child of Joyce Culpeper and Sir Ralph Leigh. She had two younger sisters and two younger brothers:

- Margaret Leigh (born c. 1500); married a man surnamed Rice.
- Joyce Leigh (born c. 1504); married John Stanney. May have had issue.
- John Leigh (born c. 1502); married Elizabeth, surname unknown. Had issue.
- Ralph Leigh (born c. 1498; died c. 1561); married Margaret Ireland. Had issue.

Her father Sir Ralph Leigh died c. 1509/1510 and Isabel's mother remarried to Lord Edmund Howard c. 1513/1515. They had six children.

- Margaret Howard (c. 1515 – 10 October 1572); married Sir Thomas Arundell of Wardour Castle, son of Sir John Arundell of Lanherne by his wife Lady Eleanor Grey, the daughter of Thomas Grey, 1st Marquess of Dorset.
- Mary Howard (born after 1515); married Edmund Trafford.
- Henry Howard (born after 1515); married Anne Howard.
- Charles Howard (born after 1515).
- George Howard (c. 1519 – 1580).
- Katherine Howard (c. 1524 – 13 February 1542); married Henry VIII of England.

== Marriage and issue ==
Isabel Leigh married Sir Edward Bayntun or Baynton of Bromham, Wiltshire, on 18 January 1531. They had three children.

- Henry Baynton (b. c. 1536). Married Anne Cavendish. Had issue.
- Francis Baynton (b. 1537)
- Anne Baynton (d. young)

After Edward's death in 1544, Isabel married Sir James Stumpe of Malmesbury, Wiltshire. James had been her step-daughter Bridget's husband, and Isabel and James married after Bridget died in 1545. James died in 1563.

Isabel married Thomas Stafford about 1565.

== Royal connections ==
The leases of many manors such as Paddington, Temple Rockley, and Chisbury were given to Edward Baynton during his marriage to Isabel. Some leases were given to Isabel after Edward Baynton's death, and they passed on to their son Henry.

On New Year's Day 1534, Isabel made a gift of a shirt to the King, embroidered with gold thread, following a gesture that had first been made by Edward's first wife Elizabeth. Isobel continued to take part in the New Year's Day gift exchange at court. In 1539 she received a silver gilt "cruse" (a cup with a cover), made by the goldsmith Morgan Wolf, and gave Henry another shirt, of Holland linen embroidered with black silk.

Isabel Baynton became one of Katherine Howard's Ladies of the Privy Chamber upon her marriage to Henry VIII. Her husband Edward Baynton was Vice-Chamberlain of the Household to all of Henry VIII's later queens, including Katherine Howard. When Queen Katherine was banished from court in 1541, Isabel was one of the four ladies-in-waiting she was allowed to take with her. An account of the jewels that was taken following the Queen's arrest noted that she had given a "girdle of goldsmith's work" to the Lady Baynton.

For a short time, from April 1539, Isabel and Edward Baynton served as guardians in charge of the households of Mary I of England, and Elizabeth I.

== Later life and death ==
In 1550, Isabel obtained a lease for the dissolved monastery at Edington, Wiltshire with Edward Hastings, 1st Baron Hastings of Loughborough. An interest in the manor of Faulston near Salisbury was declined by Isabel, but after her death in February 1573 the interest was taken up by her son Henry.
