= Chesworth House =

Tudor manor house in West Sussex, England

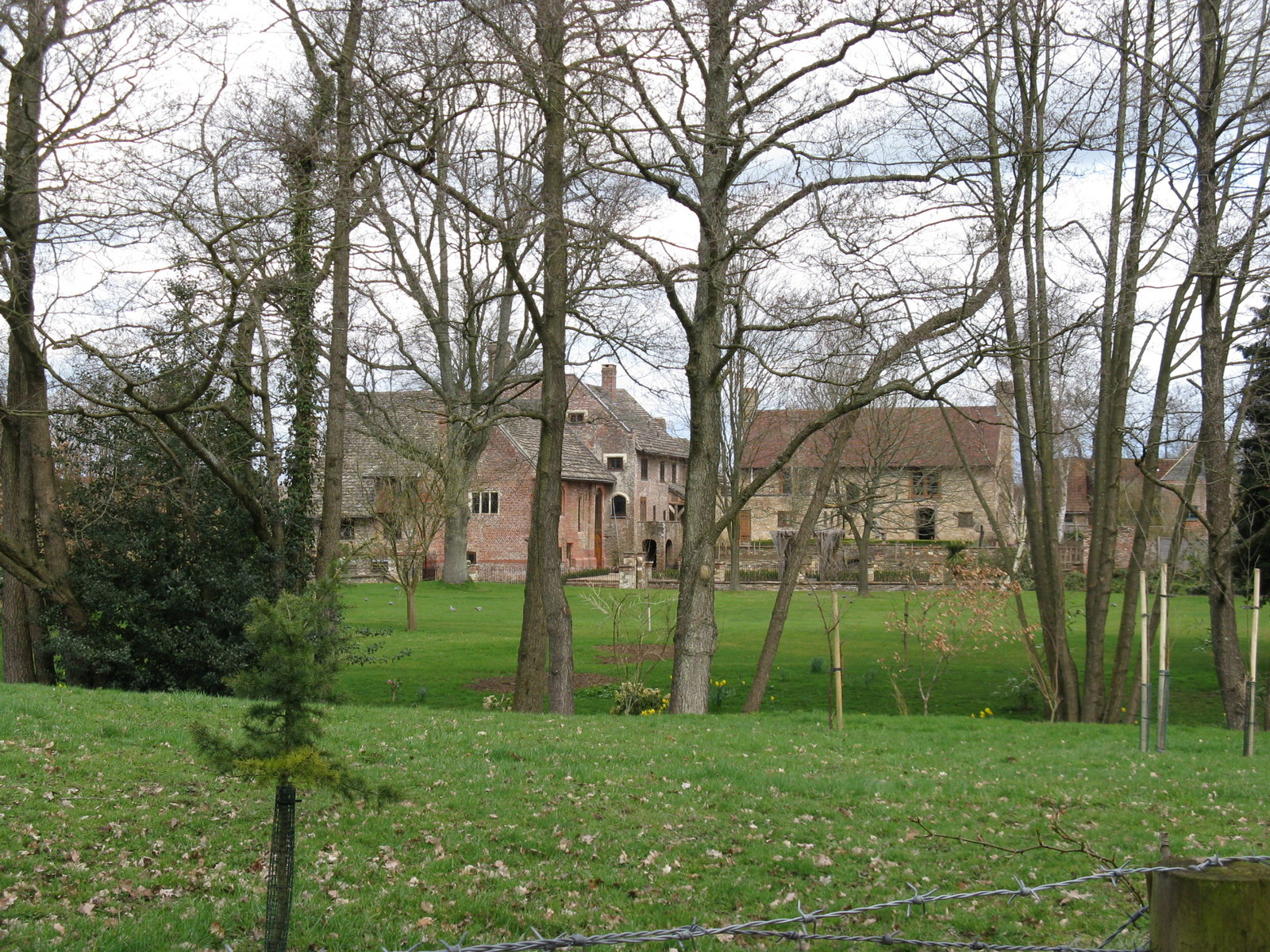
- Chesworth House in 2010

- Location within West Sussex

General information
- Location: Near Horsham, West Sussex, England
- Coordinates: 51.05257°N 0.32340°W
- Years built: Late 15th and early 16th centuries

Listed Building – Grade II*
- Official name: Chesworth House
- Designated: 22 September 1959
- Reference no.: 1027063

Chesworth House is a former Tudor manor house, located a mile south of Horsham, West Sussex, England.

The original Manor house became a farmhouse and has been extended several times. Part of the building is constructed of brick-clad timber framing, part of brick and part of stone rubble. It is a Grade II* listed building, so designated on account of its architectural interest and its historical association with three queens of England.

== History ==
The manor of Chesworth originally belonged to an English family, probably killed at the Battle of Hastings in 1066. It was then taken over by the de Braose family. Edward II apparently stayed at Chesworth in 1324.

After this it was held by the Mowbray and Howard Dukes of Norfolk. The second and third Howard Dukes substantially rebuilt the house in the late 15th and early 16th centuries; the remodeled Chesworth was large and grand enough to accommodate Henry VIII and his retinue on 24 July 1519 during his summer progress. Queen Catherine Howard spent her childhood at Chesworth under the tutelage of her grandmother Agnes, dowager Duchess of Norfolk, before being sent to court and subsequently attracting the eye of King Henry, and the house was searched as part of the investigation into her (mis)conduct before becoming queen. Thomas Howard, 4th Duke of Norfolk, was arrested at Chesworth; he was executed for high treason in 1572 after which the Crown took ownership of the estate.

Chesworth House was then occupied by various tenants, including the Bishop of Chichester (1577–82) and the Caryll family (c. 1586–1660). Queen Henrietta Maria lived there from 1660 to 1661 and Catherine of Braganza from 1674 until 1699.

The manor was later owned by the Eversfield family. In 1928 the house was bought by a Captain C. R. Cook who extended it and relaid the moated gardens, incorporating part of the river Arun which runs through the grounds. Subsequent owners included the theatrical agent Laurence Evans and the barrister Eben Hamilton.

In 2012 Chesworth House was put on sale for offers over £7 million. In 2018 the house was again offered for sale at an offer price of £6 million.

The Tudor history of the house and its connection with the Howards was the subject of a recent article in the Sixteenth Century Journal.

== See also ==
- Grade II* listed buildings in West Sussex
