= Lord Edmund Howard =

16th-century English nobleman

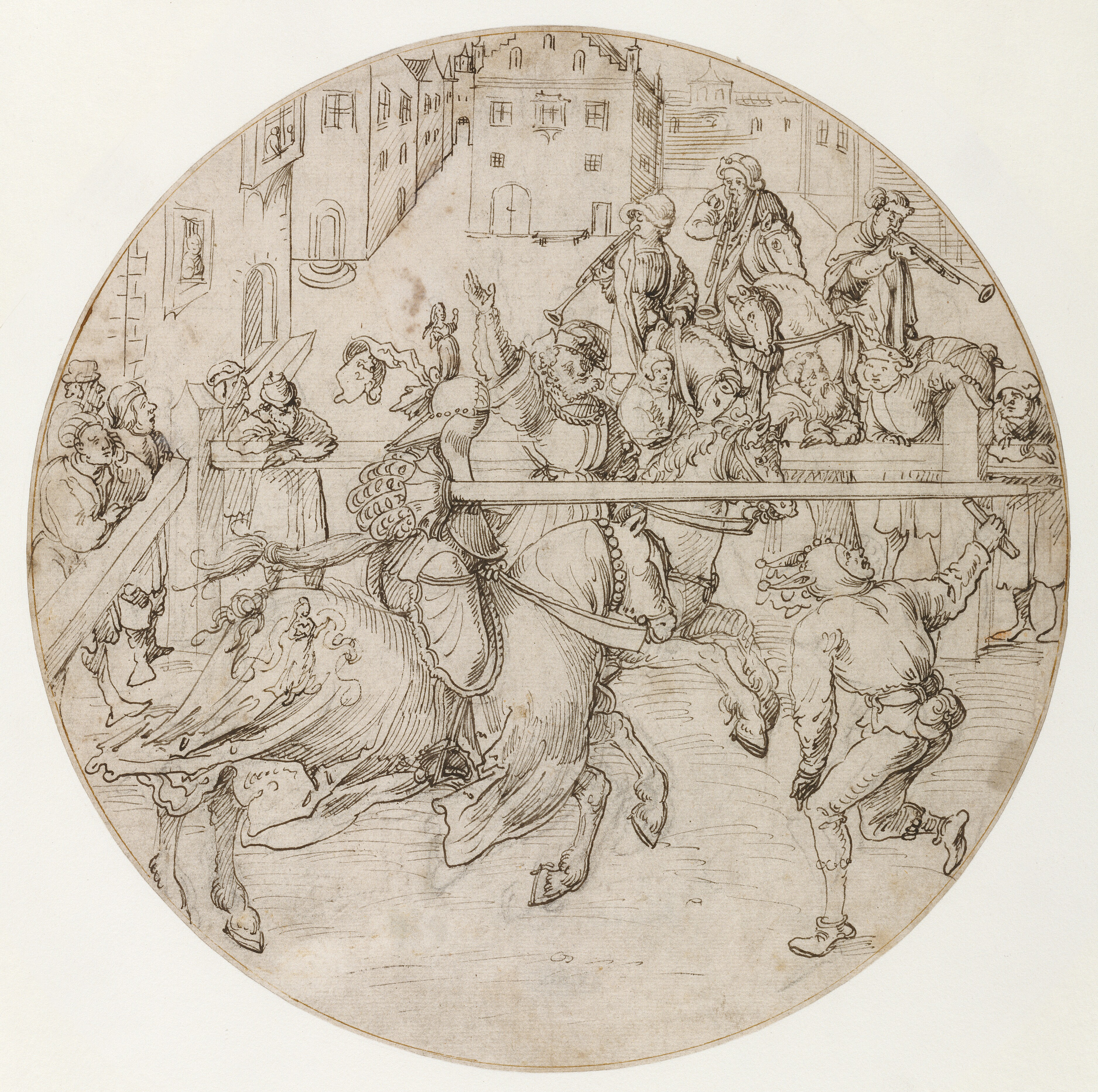
- Tournament scene, Jörg Breu the Elder c. 1510–1515
- Born: c. 1478
- Died: 19 March 1539 (aged 60–61)
- Noble family: Howard
- Spouses: Joyce Culpeper; Dorothy Troyes; Margaret Mundy (or Munday)
- Issue: Henry Howard; Sir Charles Howard; Sir George Howard; Katherine, Queen of England; Margaret Howard; Mary, Lady Trafford
- Father: Thomas Howard, 2nd Duke of Norfolk
- Mother: Elizabeth Tilney

Lord Edmund Howard (c. 1478 – 19 March 1539) was the third son of Thomas Howard, 2nd Duke of Norfolk, and his first wife, Elizabeth Tilney. His sister, Elizabeth, was the mother of Henry VIII's second wife, Anne Boleyn, and he was the father of the king's fifth wife, Katherine Howard. His first cousin, Margery Wentworth, was the mother of Henry's third wife, Jane Seymour.

== Family ==
Edmund Howard, born about 1478, was the third son of Thomas Howard, later 2nd Duke of Norfolk, and his first wife, Elizabeth Tilney. He had seven brothers and two sisters of the whole blood: Thomas Howard, 3rd Duke of Norfolk, Edward Howard, Sir John Howard, Henry Howard, (Note: died young) Charles Howard, Henry Howard, Richard Howard, Elizabeth Howard, and Muriel Howard, who married firstly, John Grey, 2nd Viscount Lisle, and secondly, Sir Thomas Knyvet.

By his father's second marriage to Agnes Tilney, Howard had seven half-brothers and sisters: John Howard, (Note: died young) John Howard, William Howard, 1st Baron Howard of Effingham, Charles Howard, Lord Thomas Howard, Henry Howard, Richard Howard, Anne Howard, Dorothy Howard, who married Edward Stanley, 3rd Earl of Derby, Katherine Howard, who married firstly Rhys ap Griffith and secondly Henry Daubeney, 1st Earl of Bridgewater, and Elizabeth Howard, who married Henry Radclyffe, 2nd Earl of Sussex.

== Career ==
Edmund Howard spent his early years at court. He spent most of his childhood at court as a pageboy in the service of King Henry VII.

In 1509 he was listed as one of the noblemen who organized the jousts for the joint coronation of Henry VIII and his first wife, Katherine of Aragon. Although his eldest brother, Thomas Howard, 3rd Duke of Norfolk, became a dominant figure at court, and another brother, Edward Howard, was a close companion of the King, Edmund appears not to have shared the King's favour and seems to have been considered ineffectual.

Biographers have described Howard as 'a spendthrift who soon dissipated his first wife's lands in Kent and Hampshire and fled abroad to avoid his creditors, leaving his numerous children to be brought up by relatives'.

Gareth Russell writes:

Edmund Howard cannot have been thrilled at the arrival of another daughter. Girls required dowries and Edmund was already struggling financially. Katherine had the bad luck to be born to a man who peaked long before he became a father. Edmund was a toxic combination of corrupt, unstable, and pathetic, but he had not always been that. Those who knew him in his youth described Katherine’s father as ‘a courage and an hardy young lusty gentleman’. One of seven sons, but the third to reach adulthood, he had his father’s and brothers’ athletic capabilities, but lacked their acute social intelligence.

Howard was Marshal of the Horse at the Battle of Flodden on 9 September 1513, and attended the King at the Field of the Cloth of Gold in 1520, where he was one of the challengers in the tournaments. In 1530 or 1531, with the assistance of Thomas Cromwell, Howard was made Controller of Calais. He was dismissed from the post in 1539, possibly due to ill health after many years of ineffectual service, where he achieved very little, and earned even less.

Howard died on 19 March 1539, a year before his daughter, Katherine Howard, became Queen of England. His widow, Margaret, was among the ladies appointed to serve her step-daughter when her household was formed in August 1540. Margaret later married Henry Manock. (Note: Weir spells the name "Manock") Steinman conjectured that Margaret Mundy's third husband was the Henry Manox, who had been music master to Katherine Howard in her youth, and had been involved in sexual indiscretions with her which later contributed to her downfall. Bindoff established that Margaret Mundy's third husband, Henry Manock, made his will on 18 March 1564, in which he disinherited both Margaret and his son. Margaret (née Mundy) was buried at Streatham, Surrey, on 22 January 1565.

== Marriages and issue ==
Howard married firstly Joyce Culpeper (c.1480 – c.1528), widow of Ralph Leigh, esquire (d. 6 November 1509) of Stockwell (in Lambeth), Surrey, and daughter of Richard Culpeper, esquire, of Oxenhoath, West Peckham, Kent. By her first marriage, Joyce Culpeper had two sons and three daughters who were thus Howard's stepchildren:

- Sir John Leigh (d.1566), thought to have supplied the French ambassador Antoine de Noailles with information in 1553. John Leigh married a wife named Elizabeth, and by her had a daughter, Agnes Leigh (d. before 1590), who married firstly, Sir Thomas Paston (c. 1515 – 4 September 1550), a gentleman of King Henry VIII's Privy Chamber, the fourth but third surviving son of Sir William Paston (c. 1479 – 1554) and Bridget Heydon, and secondly, Edward Fitzgerald, (17 January 1528 – 1597), a younger brother of Gerald FitzGerald, 11th Earl of Kildare (1525–1585).
- Ralph Leigh (d. before 1563), who married Margaret Ireland, the daughter of William Ireland, esquire, and by her had a son,
  - John Leigh, esquire, who married Margery Saunders, and a daughter,
    - Frances, who married Edward Morgan.
- Isabel Leigh, who married firstly, Sir Edward Baynton, secondly, Sir James Stumpe, and thirdly, Thomas Stafford, esquire.
- Joyce Leigh, who married John Stanney, esquire.
- Margaret Leigh, who married a husband surnamed Rice.

Howard and Joyce Culpeper had three sons and three daughters:

- Sir Charles Howard
- Henry Howard, Esquire
- Sir George Howard (c.1525–1575)
- Margaret Howard (c.1515 – 10 October 1572), who married Sir Thomas Arundell of Wardour Castle, and had issue
  - Sir Matthew Arundell
  - Charles Arundell
- Katherine Howard (1522–13 February 1542), who married Henry VIII and had no issue.
- Mary Howard, who married Edmund Trafford.

Lord Edmund Howard married secondly, Dorothy Troyes, daughter of Thomas Troyes of Hampshire, and widow of Sir William Ulvedale (son of Sir William Uvedale), about May 1530.

Lord Edmund Howard married thirdly, before 12 July 1537, Margaret Mundy (or Munday), daughter of Sir John Mundy (or Munday), Lord Mayor of London, and widow of Nicholas Jennings. Howard had no issue by his second and third wives.
