= William Uvedale (soldier) =

English soldier and courtier (1454/5–1525)

Sir William Uvedale KB
- Born: 1455; Wickham, Hampshire
- Died: 2 January 1524 (aged 68)
- Spouse: Anne Sidney (m.)
- Issue: 2 sons
- Father: Sir Thomas Uvedale

Sir William Uvedale (1455 – 1524) was an English soldier and courtier.

== Biography ==
=== Origins ===
William Uvedale was the son and heir of Sir Thomas Uvedale of Wickham, Hampshire, and of Titsey, Surrey, High Sheriff of Surrey and Sussex in 1437 and 1464. The family name appears from the oldest deeds to have been D'Ovedale or D'Ouvedale. Other variations of the name are Uvedall, Uvedail, Vuedall, Udall, Woodall, and Woodhall. A writer in a sixteenth-century manuscript, desirous of identifying the Uvedale family with that of Wodehall, Cumberland, says, "Thei call the name Woddall, and some call it Udall, and some Wodhall".

=== Life ===
William was born in 1455, and on 10 May 1483 was appointed to the command of Portchester Castle and town. On 5 June of the same year he was summoned to receive knighthood at the coronation of Edward V, which, though fixed for 22 June, was never solemnised. In 1484 he was attainted of treason by Richard III. On 19 January 1485 he obtained a pardon; but that he remained hostile to Richard III's government may perhaps be inferred from the fact that Henry VII, shortly after his accession, appointed him an Esquire of the Body. On 29 November 1489 Uvedale was created Knight of the Bath. He was High Sheriff of Hampshire in 1480, 1487, and 1493. In 1488 he was a commissioner of musters for the county, doubtless for the war against France. He was frequently on the commissions of the peace for Hampshire, Shropshire, Worcestershire, the Welsh marches, Gloucestershire, and Herefordshire, and on 7 March 1510 was nominated a member of the Council of Wales. On 3 July 1512 he was appointed one of a commission of six to inquire into insurrections in Wales.

In 1517 he was nominated a commissioner to report the cases of inclosure in Herefordshire, Worcestershire, and Gloucestershire. Of the returns of this commission all that remains is a transcript of selected cases preserved among the Lansdowne manuscripts in the British Library, which were printed among the transactions of the Royal Historical Society for 1893. Sir William Uvedale received several marks of favour from Henry VIII.

In 1522, when war was declared against France, he was again a commissioner of musters for Hampshire, and in the following year he was appointed a commissioner of subsidy for Gloucestershire. He died on 2 January 1524, his wife Anne, daughter and coheiress of William Sidney, having predeceased him in 1512. He had two sons, of whom the eldest was Sir William Uvedale (1484?–1528), whose widow Dorothy, daughter and coheiress of Thomas Troyes, became the second wife of Lord Edmund Howard, father of Queen Katherine Howard, and whose fourth son was Richard Uvedale.

== William Uvedale (died 1542) ==
Sir William Uvedale
- Died: 1542
- Spouse: Jane Dawson (m.)
- Issue: 5 (4 sons, 1 daughter)
- Father: Sir Henry Uvedale
- Mother: Edith Pool

A contemporary Sir William Uvedale (died 1542) was son and heir of Sir Henry Uvedale of More Crichel (his family being an offshoot of the Uvedale family of Wickham) and High Sheriff of Dorset in 1504, by Edith Pool of Gloucestershire. He was appointed customer of wools, hides, and fleeces in the port of London on 2 January 1522, and was a commissioner for raising the subsidy in Dorset in 1523. He was, however, careful, as the Bishop of Winchester complained to Wolsey, to evade payment of his own share; nevertheless in 1533 he again discharged the same office.

It appears that he had succeeded his father in the office of comptroller and collector of customs at Poole. He frequently appears in the commissions of the peace for Dorset. In 1527 he procured a pardon for all malversations in his office as comptroller of the port of Poole since 3 December 1515, a proceeding which recalls his conduct in connection with the subsidy of 1523.

In 1527 he obtained a grant from the Crown of land in East Purbeck, Dorset. At the coronation of Anne Boleyn in 1533 he was created a Knight of the Sword. On 8 July 1535 he surrendered the customership of London, which he had enjoyed for thirteen years, and it was granted to William Thynne as the result of a friendly transaction between the two. That Uvedale was a friend to the reforming party, and trusted by the King, is apparent from the occurrence of his name in 1536 on a list of noblemen and gentlemen of the southern counties, to whom it was in contemplation to write for assistance in the suppression of the northern rebellion.

Upon the dissolution of the abbey of Wilton he received a grant of the manor of Higher Bridmore in the parish of Berwick St John, Wiltshire, and in 1539 of the manor and rectory of Kimmeridge, Dorset, part of the property of the dissolved monastery of Cerne. He is stated by Hutchins to have been "server" to Henry VIII. He died in 1542, leaving by his wife Jane, daughter of John Dawson of Norfolk, four sons and one daughter.

== Bibliography ==
- Grants of Edward V (Camd. Soc.) 60;
- Letters and Papers of Henry VIII;
- Hutchins's History of Dorset, ii. 487;
- Hoare's History of Wiltshire, lv. 29;
- Leveson-Gower's "Notices of the Family of Uvedale of Titsey, Surrey, and Wickham, Hampshire", in Surrey Archæological Collections, iii. 63–192.
- Woodward's History of Hampshire, 3 vols.;
- Berry's Hampshire Genealogies, 1833, p. 74.

== Sources ==
- Leadam, Isaac Saunders (1899). "Uvedale, William" . In Lee, Sidney (ed.). Dictionary of National Biography. Vol. 58. London: Smith, Elder & Co. pp. 77–78.
