= Henry Baynton I =

English politician

Henry Baynton (fl. 1572 – 1593) was an English politician who was a Member (MP) of the Parliament of England for Malmesbury in 1572, Devizes in 1584, 1586 and 1593 and for Old Sarum in 1589.

He was the first son of Sir Edward Bayntun's second wife Isabel Leigh. On his mother's death in 1573 he inherited Faulston manor (Bishopstone, near Salisbury) but it was soon sold.

His biographer in The History of Parliament records him as "of Woodford, Wilts." and notes that he "sat for an assortment of Wiltshire boroughs, without leaving any mark on the known proceedings of the House".

He married Anne Cavendish. Bess of Hardwick called her "Nan Baynton" in a letter of 1580.
