= Lord Thomas Howard =

English nobleman (1511-1537)

- Born: 1511
- Died: 31 October 1537 (aged 25–26); Tower of London
- Noble family: Howard
- Father: Thomas Howard, 2nd Duke of Norfolk
- Mother: Agnes Tilney

Lord Thomas Howard (1511 – 31 October 1537) was an English courtier at the court of King Henry VIII. He is chiefly known for his marriage (later invalidated by Henry) to Lady Margaret Douglas (1515–1578), the daughter of Henry VIII's sister, Margaret Tudor, for which he was imprisoned in the Tower of London, where he died on 31 October 1537. The affair is referenced in a verse by his nephew, the poet Henry Howard, Earl of Surrey.

== Early life ==
Howard was a younger son of Thomas Howard, Earl of Surrey, later 2nd Duke of Norfolk, by his second marriage to Agnes Tilney. He was a half-brother of Thomas Howard, 3rd Duke of Norfolk, son of the 2nd duke by his first marriage, and is often confused with his elder brother.

Lord Thomas was at court in 1533 when his niece, Anne Boleyn, married King Henry VIII as his second wife, and helped to bear the canopy at the christening of Anne's daughter, Elizabeth. In the years which followed he was often at court, and it was there that he met Lady Margaret Douglas (1515–1578), the daughter of Henry VIII's sister, Margaret Tudor, and her second husband, Archibald Douglas, 6th Earl of Angus (c. 1489 – 1557). By the end of 1535 Lord Thomas and Lady Margaret Douglas had fallen in love and become secretly engaged.

== Imprisonment and death ==
Howard's niece, Queen Anne, fell from power in May 1536. This undoubtedly contributed to the King's fury when in early July 1536 he learned of the marriage contract of Lord Thomas and Lady Margaret since Lady Margaret was at the time next in the line of succession as a result of the King's bastardization of his daughters Mary and Elizabeth. The couple were committed to the Tower, and on 18 July 1536 an Act of Attainder accusing Howard of attempting to 'interrupt ympedyte and lett the seid Succession of the Crowne' was passed in both houses of Parliament. The Act sentenced Howard to death, and forbade the marriage of any member of the King's family without his permission. The death sentence was not carried out, and Lord Thomas languished in the Tower even though Lady Margaret was required to renounce their relationship by King Henry's minister Thomas Cromwell. While in the Tower, Lady Margaret fell ill, and the king allowed her to be moved to Syon Abbey under the supervision of the abbess. There are many reports that her illness was her pregnancy with Lord Thomas Howard's son and thus she was sent to the Abbey during her confinement. She was released from the Abbey on 29 October 1537. Howard remained in the Tower, where he caught an illness and died on 31 October 1537. There is an unsubstantiated tradition that he was poisoned. His body was given to his mother, the Dowager Duchess of Norfolk, with the stipulation that it be buried 'without pomp'. Howard was interred at Thetford Abbey.

In 1540, Lady Margaret Douglas was disgraced in a similar affair with Thomas Howard's nephew Sir Charles Howard, the son of Lord Thomas's elder half-brother Lord Edmund Howard, and a brother of Henry VIII's fifth wife, Katherine Howard.

== Poem ==
Lord Thomas's nephew, Henry Howard, Earl of Surrey, referred to his death in a poem to "his Geraldine" (Lady Elizabeth Fitsgerald):—

If you be fair and fresh, am I not of your hue?
And for my vaunt I dare well say, my blood is not untrue;
For you yourself doth know, it is not long ago
Sith that for love one of the race did end his life in woe,
In Tower both strong and high, for his assured truth,
Whereas in tears he spent his breath, alas, the more the ruth!
This gentle beast so died, whom nothing could remove,
But willingly to seek his death for loss of his true love.
