= George Howard (courtier) =

English courtier, politician, author and diplomat

Sir George Howard
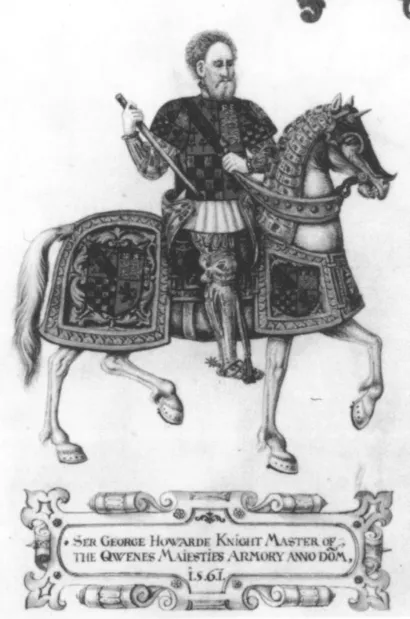
- An illustration of Sir George Howard.
- Born: c. 1525; Lambeth, England
- Died: 1580 (aged 54–55)
- Noble family: Howard
- Father: Lord Edmund Howard
- Mother: Joyce Culpeper

Sir George Howard (c.1525–1580) was an English courtier, politician, author and diplomat, and the brother of King Henry VIII's fifth queen, Catherine Howard. Howard held offices at court under four monarchs, Henry VIII, Edward VI, Mary I, and Elizabeth I, most notably the office of Master of the Armoury, and undertook several diplomatic missions. A masque written by Howard was produced at court during the reign of Edward VI, and he is mentioned by name in the Langham letter, which describes the Earl of Leicester's entertainment of Queen Elizabeth at Kenilworth Castle in July 1575.

== Life ==
Howard was the third son of Lord Edmund Howard (c.1478 – 19 March 1539), the third son of Thomas Howard, 2nd Duke of Norfolk by his first wife, Elizabeth Tilney. Lord Edmund Howard was reputed a spendthrift who wasted the lands he obtained through his first marriage to Joyce Culpeper, the daughter and coheir of Sir Richard Culpeper of Oxen Hoath, Kent, and 'fled abroad to avoid his creditors', leaving his children by her to be brought up by relatives. It thus seems likely that Sir George, like his sister Katherine, later Queen Katherine Howard, spent part of his early life in the household of his step-grandmother, the Dowager Duchess of Norfolk.

Howard's father died on 19 March 1539, 'overwhelmed by debts'. However Howard's financial situation was alleviated in 1540 when his sister, Katherine, married King Henry VIII as his fifth wife. The King granted Howard a pension of 100 marks, several manors, and, together with his brother Charles, a licence to import Gascon wine. On 13 February 1542, however, Howard's sister Katherine was executed for treason, and Howard turned to soldiering, serving as a captain at Boulogne in 1546, and as a standard-bearer at the Battle of Pinkie in 1547, for which latter service his 'forward courage' was noted and he was knighted by Somerset on 28 September 1547. Howard campaigned again in Scotland in 1548, and was sent on a diplomatic mission to King Henry II of France in May 1551.

Howard sat as the member for Devizes during the first Parliament of King Edward VI. His masque, The Triumph of Cupid, Venus and Mars, was produced at court during the Christmas season of 1552-1553 by George Ferrers.

After the young King's death on 6 July 1553, Howard at first joined Northumberland's forces, but is said to have quarreled with Northumberland's son, and speedily taken 50 horse to join the forces supporting Queen Mary I. On her accession the Queen at first treated Howard with suspicion, but in January 1554 granted him an annuity of £200. Howard further demonstrated his allegiance by serving with his uncle, Thomas Howard, 3rd Duke of Norfolk, in putting down Wyatt's rebellion in that year. When Norfolk died on 25 August 1554, Howard was chief mourner.

Howard was appointed carver to Queen Mary's husband, Philip II of Spain, but was unable to take up the position when the King arrived in England in 1554 with his own entourage of Spanish servants. He was sent on a diplomatic mission to the Emperor in the same year, and later sat as a member of Parliament for Rochester in Kent. In 1558 he sat as member for Winchelsea.

Howard's cousin Elizabeth I acceded to the throne in November 1558. Howard was with the court at Kenilworth Castle when the Queen's favourite, the Earl of Leicester, entertained the Queen there in lavish splendour in July 1575. In the Langham Letter, which describes the Kenilworth entertainment in lively detail, the author refers to Howard as someone with whom he is on friendly terms: 'In afternoons and a nights, sumtime am I with the right woorshipfull Syr George Howard, az good a Gentlman as ony lyves: And sumtime at my good Lady Sydneyz chamber, a Noblwooman, that I am az mooch boound untoo, az ony poor man may be untoo so gracious a Lady'. He is one of the few courtiers mentioned by name in the Letter.

In 1560 he was given the position of Master of the Armouries for life and by 1579 the Queen had appointed him a Gentleman Usher of the Privy Chamber. In his latter years Howard lived in Kent, where he served as a Justice of the Peace and was certified by Archbishop Matthew Parker as 'favourable to sound religion'.

Howard died in 1580.
