= Lacey Baldwin Smith =

American historian and author (1922–2013)

Lacey Baldwin Smith (1922 – September 8, 2013) was an historian and author specialising in 16th-century England. He was the author of Henry VIII: The Mask of Royalty and Catherine Howard: A Tudor Tragedy, among other books.

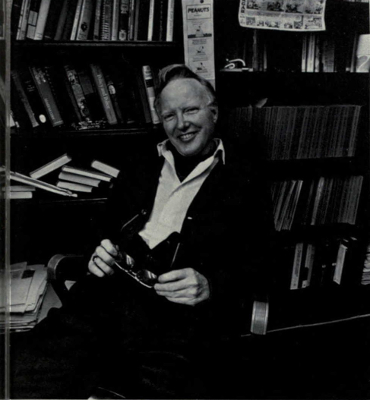
Lacey Baldwin Smith at Northwestern University, 1975

Born in Princeton, New Jersey, Smith taught at Princeton University, the Massachusetts Institute of Technology, and Northwestern University. He received two Fulbright awards, two National Endowment for the Humanities fellowships, a Guggenheim Fellowship, and other awards. He lived in Vermont during his retirement, dying at Greensboro.

He was elected a Fellow of the Royal Society of Literature in 1972.

== Works ==
- Tudor Prelates and Politics, 1536–1558 (Princeton Studies in History. vol. 8.) (1953)
- Catherine Howard: A Tudor Tragedy
- The Elizabethan Epic (1966)
- The Horizon Book of the Elizabethan World (1966; Reprinted as The Elizabethan World, 1973)
- Henry VIII: The Mask of Royalty (1973)
- Elizabeth Tudor: Portrait of a Queen (1976)
- Dimensions of the Holocaust (1977, 2nd ed., 1990). Lectures at Northwestern University by Elie Wiesel, Lucy S. Dawidowicz, Dorothy Rabinowitz, and Robert McAfee Brown; foreword by Lacey Baldwin Smith.
- Treason in Tudor England: Politics & Paranoia (1986)
- Fools, Martyrs, Traitors: The Story of Martyrdom in the Western World (1997)
- English History Made Brief, Irreverent and Pleasurable (2007)
- This Realm of England 1399–1688
- Anne Boleyn: The Queen of Controversy (2013)
