= Joyce Culpeper =

English noblewoman (c. 1480–1528)

- Born: c. 1480
- Died: c. 1528
- Noble family: Howard (by marriage)
- Spouses: Ralph Leigh; Lord Edmund Howard
- Issue: Sir John Leigh; Ralph Leigh; Isabel Leigh; Joyce Leigh; Margaret Leigh; Henry Howard; Sir Charles Howard; Sir George Howard; Margaret Howard; Catherine, Queen of England; Mary Howard
- Father: Sir Richard Culpeper
- Mother: Isabel Worsley

Jocasta "Joyce" Culpeper (c. 1480 – c. 1528), of Oxon Hoath, was the mother of Katherine Howard, the fifth wife and queen consort of King Henry VIII.

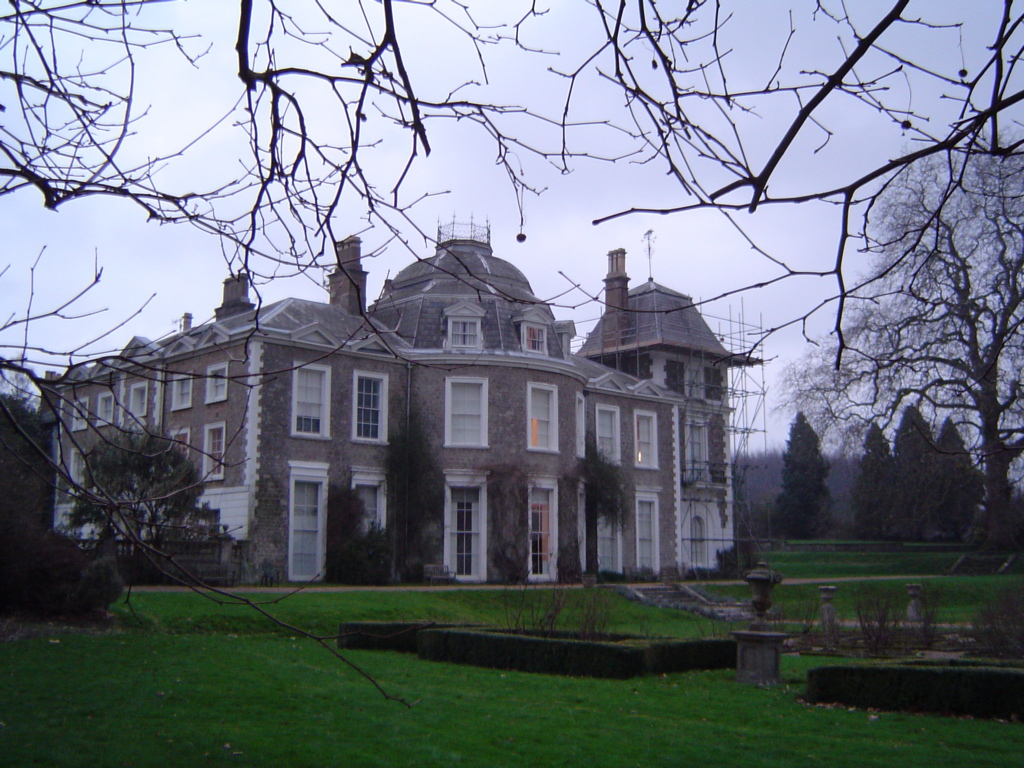
Oxon Hoath, enlarged from the original manor house built by the Culpeper family.

== Family ==
Joyce Culpeper, born before 1480, was the daughter of Sir Richard Culpeper (d. 4 October 1484) and his second wife, Isabel Worsley (born c. 1450 – 18 April 1527), the daughter of Otewell Worsley of Southwark, Surrey, by Rose Trevor.

Also called Jocasta.

Joyce Culpeper had a brother, Thomas Culpeper (not to be confused with the Thomas Culpeper allegedly involved with her daughter Katherine Howard) (1484 – 7 October 1492), and a younger sister, Margaret. Joyce and Margaret were co-heiresses to their brother, Thomas Culpeper, in 1492. It has been erroneously stated that Joyce Culpeper had another sister, Elizabeth, who married Joyce's eldest son, Sir John Leigh (1520–1564). However, only Joyce and Margaret are named as co-heiresses to their brother, Thomas, in the inquisition post mortem taken after his death, and it seems clear that Margaret was Joyce Culpeper's only sister by her mother's marriage to Sir Richard Culpeper. Margaret married firstly, Richard Welbeck, esquire, by whom she had a son, John Welbeck. After Richard Welbeck's death, Margaret Culpeper married William Cotton, esquire.

After the death of Sir Richard Culpeper, Joyce's mother, Isabel, married Sir John Leigh (d. 17 August 1523) of Stockwell (in Lambeth) and Levehurst, Surrey, the elder son of Ralph Leigh, esquire, and Elizabeth Langley, the daughter of Henry Langley, by whom she is said to have had a son, John Leigh, and a daughter, Joyce Leigh.

== Marriages and issue ==
Before 1492 Joyce Culpeper married Ralph Leigh (d. 6 November 1509), esquire, the younger brother of her stepfather, Sir John Leigh (d. 17 August 1523). Ralph Leigh was Treasurer of the Inner Temple in 1505-6, at which time he shared a chamber with his elder brother, Sir John Leigh. At the time of her first marriage, Joyce was twelve years old. By Ralph Leigh, Joyce Culpeper had two sons and three daughters:

- Sir John Leigh (1502–1564). Leigh was among those knighted (as 'John a Lee') on 2 October 1553, the day after the coronation of Queen Mary. By his wife, Elizabeth, whose surname is unknown, Leigh had a daughter, Agnes Leigh (d. before 1590), who married firstly, Sir Thomas Paston (c. 1515 – 4 September 1550), a gentleman of King Henry VIII's Privy Chamber, the fourth but third surviving son of Sir William Paston (c. 1479 – 1554) and Bridget Heydon, and secondly, Edward Fitzgerald, (17 January 1528 – 1597), a younger brother of Gerald FitzGerald, 11th Earl of Kildare (1525–1585), by whom she was the mother of Gerald FitzGerald, 14th Earl of Kildare. Leigh was in Cardinal Wolsey's household as a youth, had travelled to Jerusalem before 1538, was a prisoner in the Tower in that year, was in Antwerp in September 1561, and was a friend of Sir Thomas Gresham; according to Gresham, Leigh was 'the man that preserved me when Queen Mary came to the crown'. In 1541 Leigh was called before the Privy Council to answer for having twice had contact with Cardinal Pole while on the continent. According to Warnicke, Leigh's half-sister, Queen Katherine Howard, had once 'obtained the release from prison of her kinsman John Legh', and it seems likely that it was on this occasion that the Queen exercised her influence on Leigh's behalf. Leigh is perhaps best known for a quarrel with his kinsman, Henry Howard, Earl of Surrey. On 13 July 1542, Howard was committed to the 'pestilent ayres' of the Fleet by the Privy Council for having struck Leigh. Three weeks later Howard met with the King, and after entering into a recognizance on 5 August in the amount of 10,000 marks to guarantee his future good behaviour towards Leigh, was released from custody. According to Burgon, Leigh himself was subsequently committed to the Fleet in August 1547, released after entering into a recognizance in the amount of £2000 to guarantee his good behaviour, and again confined to prison in November of that year, on both occasions for reasons unknown. Leigh made his last will on 30 April 1563, to which he added a codicil on 14 March 1564. The will was proved on 5 February 1566. Leigh's principal heir was his nephew, John Leigh (d. 19 or 20 January 1576), son of his brother Ralph (d. before 1563). Although Leigh bequeathed his wife, Elizabeth, an annuity, the will reveals that he had earlier divorced her 'on certain sufficient grounds'. Leigh died in 1564, and was buried in the church of St. Margaret, Lothbury. Stow has preserved his epitaph, which states that he was 'to sundry countries known/ A worthy knight, well of his prince esteemed'.
- Ralph Leigh (d. before 1563), who married Margaret Ireland, the daughter of William Ireland, esquire, and by her had a son, John Leigh (d. 19 or 20 January 1576), esquire, who married Margery Saunders, and a daughter, Frances, who married Edward Morgan. As noted above, Ralph Leigh's son, John, was the heir of his uncle, Sir John Leigh (1502–1564). After John Leigh's death in 1576, his widow, Margery, married, before 1580, Sir William Killigrew, by whom she had a son, Robert Killigrew, and two daughters, Katherine Killigrew, who married Sir Thomas Jermyn, and Elizabeth Killigrew, who married Sir Maurice Berkeley.
- Isabel Leigh (d. 16 February 1573), who married firstly, Sir Edward Baynton (d. 27 November 1544), by whom she had two sons and a daughter, secondly, Sir James Stumpe (d. 29 April 1563), and thirdly, Thomas Stafford, esquire.
- Joyce Leigh, who married John Stanney, esquire.
- Margaret Leigh, who married a husband surnamed Rice.

Ralph Leigh died 6 November 1509, and Joyce Culpeper married Lord Edmund Howard, and by him had three sons and three daughters:

- Henry Howard, esquire.
- Sir Charles Howard, who incurred Henry VIII's displeasure for having fallen in love with Margaret Douglas, later Countess of Lennox, while Margaret was serving as first lady of honour to Charles' sister, Queen Katherine Howard.
- Margaret Howard (c. 1515 d. 10 October 1571), who married Sir Thomas Arundell of Wardour Castle, beheaded on Tower Hill on 26 February 1552, and by him had two sons, Sir Matthew Arundell (d. 24 December 1598) of Wardour Castle, and Charles Arundell (d. 1587), and two daughters, Dorothy, who married Sir Henry Weston, and Jane, who married Sir William Bevyle.
- Catherine Howard (c. 1523 – 13 February 1542), who married Henry VIII and became Queen of England, but had no issue. She was executed for treason and adultery by her husband in 1542.
- Sir George Howard (c. 1525 – 1580).
- Mary Howard, who married Edmund Trafford.

== Death ==
Joyce Culpeper was living in 1527. She is thought to have died about 1528.

After Joyce Culpeper's death, Lord Edmund Howard married secondly, Dorothy Troyes, daughter of Thomas Troyes of Hampshire, and widow of Sir William Uvedale (d.1529), and thirdly, before 12 July 1537, Margaret Munday, daughter of Sir John Munday, Lord Mayor of London, and widow of Nicholas Jennings, but had no issue by either marriage.

== Ancestry ==
Ancestors of Joyce Culpeper

16. William Culpeper of Preston Hall in Aylesford (c 1342 – c 1402)
8. Sir John Culpeper of Oxen Hoath (c. 1366 – 1414)
4. Sir William Culpeper of Preston Hall (c. 1387 – 1457)
18. Richard Charles
9. Katherine Charles (c. 1370 – c. 1424)
19. Joane
2. Sir Richard Culpeper of Oxen Hoath (c. 1428 – 1484)
20. Henry Ferrers, 4th Baron Ferrers of Groby (1356–1388)
10. William Ferrers, 5th Baron Ferrers of Groby (1372–1445)
21. Joan de Hoo
5. Elizabeth Ferrers of Groby (c. 1392 – c. 1460)
22. Roger Clifford, 5th Baron Clifford (1333–1389)
11. Phillippa Clifford (c. 1372 – 1441)
23. Maud Beauchamp (d. 1402)
1. Joyce Culpeper (before 1480 – after 1527)
24. Robert Worlsey
12. Richard Worsley
25. Isabel Trafford
6. Otwell Worsley of Stamworth (c. 1410 - 1470)
26. John Clark
13. Katherine Clark
27. Sarah de Stokeprt
3. Isabel Worsley (c. 1450 – 1527)
28. Dafydd ap Ednyfed
14. Edward Trevor
29. Gwenhwyfer ferch Adda Goch
7. Rose Trevor (c. 1416 - after 1465)
30. Robert Puleston
15. Angharad Puleston
31. Lowri ferch Gruffudd Fychan

== See also ==
- Sephton, James H., Preston Hall, Aylesford, 496 Station Road, Aylesford, Kent: J. H. Sephton, 1997, Repository: Warren Culpepper's Personal Library.
- Joanna Denny: Katherine Howard – A Tudor Conspiracy, portrait, London 2005, ISBN 0-7499-5120-6
