= Charles Howard (courtier) =

English courtier

- Known for: Lover of Margaret Douglas; brother of Katherine Howard
- Partner: Margaret Douglas
- Parent(s): Lord Edmund Howard; Joyce Culpeper
- Relatives: Katherine Howard (sister); Sir George Howard (brother); Thomas Howard, 3rd Duke of Norfolk (paternal uncle)
- Family: Howard

Charles Howard was a gentleman at the court of Henry VIII of England.

He was the eldest son of Lord Edmund Howard and Joyce Culpeper, and the elder brother of Sir George Howard. His maternal grandmother, Isabel Worsley, mentioned him first among her Howard grandchildren. As a scion of the mighty Howard family, his uncle, Thomas Howard, 3rd Duke of Norfolk, secured him a position at court. Charles' fortunes improved in 1540, when his sister, Katherine Howard, became King Henry VIII's fifth wife.

Gareth Russell writes:

Charles Howard received a few properties from the king, £100 a year, a licence to import 1,000 tons of Gascon wine and French timber, and a place as a gentleman of the Privy Chamber. But in comparison to the treasures that were heaped upon them in popular legend, the Howards were left wanting.

With his sister's encouragement Charles entered into a relationship with the King's niece, Margaret Douglas, the daughter of Henry's sister, Margaret Tudor, Queen Dowager of Scotland, who had previously contracted a similar mesalliance with his half-uncle Lord Thomas Howard. The king did not approve. Gareth Russell writes:

Charles Howard seems to have had the Howard charisma seeping out of his fingertips, and if he was not quite the stuff of the council chamber, he at least fitted in perfectly to the merrymaking routine that dominated the court in the latter half of 1540.

A seventeenth-century account states that he was killed fighting in France, three years after his rustication in 1541. He died without issue.

== Ancestry ==
Ancestors of Charles Howard (courtier)

16. Sir Robert Howard
8. John Howard, 1st Duke of Norfolk
17. Margaret Mowbray
4. Thomas Howard, 2nd Duke of Norfolk
18. Sir William Moleyns
9. Catherine Moleyns
19. Marjery Whalesborough
2. Lord Edmund Howard
20. Sir Philip Tilney
10. Sir Frederick Tilney
21. Isabel Thorp
5. Elizabeth Tilney
22. Sir Lawrence Cheney
11. Elizabeth Cheney
23. Elizabeth Cokayn
1. Charles Howard
24. Sir John Culpeper
12. Sir William Culpeper
25. Catherine Charles
6. Richard Culpeper Esq
26. William Ferrers, 5th Baron Ferrers of Groby
13. Elizabeth Ferrers
27. Philippe Clifford
3. Joyce Culpeper
28. Richard Worsley
14. Ottwell Worsley
29. Catherine Clark
7. Isabel Worsley
30. Edward Trevor
15. Rose Trevor
31. Angharad Puleston

== Bibliography ==
- Richardson, D. (2011). Kimball G. Everingham (ed.). Magna Carta Ancestry. Vol. 2 (2nd ed.). Salt Lake City. ISBN 978-1449966386.
- Richardson, D. (2011). Kimball G. Everingham (ed.). Magna Carta Ancestry. Vol. 4 (2nd ed.). Salt Lake City. ISBN 978-1460992708.
