= Joanna Denny =

British historian and author

Joanna Denny (fl. 2005 - died 2006) was a historian and author specialising in the court of King Henry VIII. Her books include Katherine Howard: A Tudor Conspiracy and Anne Boleyn. Her books are usually considered to be sympathetic towards these women. She was published by Portrait Books, an imprint of Piatkus. She is a descendant of Sir Anthony Denny, Henry VIII's trusted servant. She died in 2006, shortly before the publication of her book on Anne Boleyn.
