= Precontract =

Legal contract (or promise marriage) preceding another

A precontract is a legal contract that precedes another; in particular it can refer to an existing promise of marriage with another. Such a precontract would legally nullify any later marriages into which either party entered. The practice was common in the Middle Ages, and the allegation of a precontract was the most common means of dissolving a marriage by the medieval ecclesiastical courts.

Richard III of England claimed his brother Edward IV had entered into a marriage precontract with Lady Eleanor Talbot prior to Edward's later marriage to Elizabeth Woodville. The claim is now largely, though not universally, regarded to be false; if true, it would have meant that Edward's sons by Elizabeth, the 'Princes in the Tower', would have been illegitimate and Richard, rather than they, would have inherited the throne upon Edward IV's death. This claim was the basis on which Richard III displaced and replaced his nephew Edward V as king, and the boy king and his brother disappeared in the Tower of London, missing presumed murdered.
