= Eversfield =

Eversfield is a surname. Notable people with the surname include:

- Charles Eversfield (1683–1749), British politician
- Charles Eversfield, 2nd Baronet (c. 1708–1784)
- Edward Eversfield (c. 1618–c. 1676), English courtier and politician
- James Eversfield (1795–1826), English landowner and High Sheriff of Sussex
- John Eversfield (c. 1624–1678), English politician
- Nicholas Eversfield (MP for Hastings) (c. 1584–1629), English landowner and politician
- Nicholas Eversfield (MP for Bramber) (c. 1646–1684), English landowner and politician
- Thomas Eversfield (1614–1649), English politician
- William Markwick (1739–1812), English naturalist who changed his surname to Eversfield to obtain an inheritance
