= List of The Tudors episodes =

The following is a list of episodes for the CBC/Showtime television series The Tudors. The series formally began 1 April 2007. Individual episodes are numbered.

On 20 June 2010, the 38th and final episode of the series was aired. All four seasons have been released on DVD in Regions 1, 2 and 4. All seasons were also released for a limited time on region free Blu-ray.

== Series overview ==
Series	Episodes	Originally released	
Series	Episodes	First released	Last released
1	10	1 April 2007	10 June 2007
2	10	30 March 2008	1 June 2008
3	8	5 April 2009	24 May 2009
4	10	11 April 2010	20 June 2010

== Episode list ==
=== Season 1 (2007) ===
Henry VIII is the young king of England. He faces religious unrest in his kingdom, as well as political struggles and shifting alliances with other countries. Above all, he is troubled by his failure to produce a male heir with his queen, Katherine of Aragon. Their only child to survive beyond a few days is Princess Mary, on whom he dotes. Katherine, the aunt of the Spanish king and Holy Roman Emperor Charles, is a popular queen, but Henry begins to consider a divorce, which would require the approval of the Pope, particularly after he meets Anne Boleyn.

List of The Tudors season 1 episodes
No. overall	No. in season	Title	Setting	Directed by	Written by	Original release date	US viewers (millions)
1	1	"In Cold Blood"	1518	Charles McDougall & Steve Shill	Michael Hirst	1 April 2007	0.869
Henry's uncle, the Ambassador to Urbino, is assassinated by the French and Henry seizes upon this event to plan a war with France to establish his reputation and seize back the title of King of France. The Lord Chancellor, Cardinal Wolsey, who is more interested in his own ambitions than organising a war, manipulates the young king to propose a "Treaty of Universal Peace" with France instead. Thomas More, who is Henry's former teacher and a humanist, supports the treaty, which further persuades a reluctant Henry to abandon his war plans. Wolsey arranges a summit to take place in France, and the king's daughter Mary is to be betrothed to the Dauphin of France, much against Katherine's expressed wishes. Meanwhile, Henry has an unsuspected rival to the throne in the person of Duke of Buckingham, who is a blood relative to earlier kings. Buckingham plots to murder Henry and take the throne for himself, letting Thomas Boleyn and the Duke of Norfolk know of his plan. Boleyn's beautiful daughters Mary and Anne prepare to meet King Henry; meanwhile, Henry discovers that a mistress of his named Lady Elizabeth Blount, who is one of the Queen's ladies-in-waiting, is pregnant with his child.
2	2	"Simply Henry"	1519–1520	Charles McDougall	Michael Hirst	8 April 2007	0.464
With Thomas More's encouragement, King Henry meets with King Francis of France and the two sign Wolsey's peace treaty. During the summit, Thomas Boleyn manoeuvres his elder daughter Mary into Henry's bed in an effort to secure favour for the family. Boleyn and Norfolk betray the Duke of Buckingham's plot to the king, and the Duke is executed. Katherine of Aragon continues to pray for Henry to give her a live, healthy son, but Henry wrestles with the theological problem of having married his brother's widow, and questions whether his lack of sons could be God's punishment. The English people celebrate after Elizabeth Blount gives birth to Henry's illegitimate son, and this augments Katherine's pain. When Henry loses interest in Mary Boleyn after a short time, Thomas Boleyn turns to his younger daughter Anne to replace her.
3	3	"Wolsey, Wolsey, Wolsey!"	1521	Steve Shill	Michael Hirst	15 April 2007	0.350
While Cardinal Wolsey has lost his chance to be Pope with King Henry's decision to go to war against France, a new accord with Spain and Queen Katherine's nephew Charles, Holy Roman Emperor, offers him fresh hope. Henry knights Thomas More after he helps Henry denounce Martin Luther, and orders him to destroy any copies of the Lutheran "heresy" he can seize; although he also considers Luther's work heretical, More is visibly pained by the order. The King breaks off his daughter Mary's engagement to the Dauphin of France in favour of a marriage to Charles of Spain; and Henry's elder sister, Princess Margaret, is to marry the King of Portugal. Henry enlists his closest friend Charles Brandon to escort her to Portugal after making him the Duke of Suffolk. Meanwhile, Anne Boleyn leaves a distinct impression on Henry after their first face-to-face encounter at the masquerade for the visiting Charles of Spain.
4	4	"His Majesty, The King"	1521	Steve Shill	Michael Hirst	22 April 2007	0.601
As a reward for his denunciation of Martin Luther in his book, the Defence of the Seven Sacraments, the Pope christens Henry "Defender of the Faith", but a brush with death causes the King to seek a solution to his lack of an heir. Charles V defeats Francis I and captures the latter at the Battle of Pavia. Princess Margaret reluctantly marries the decrepit King of Portugal, but the union is short-lived as she smothers him days later; Henry's desire for Anne Boleyn intensifies. Having arrested the King's secretary as a supposed French spy, Wolsey replaces him with his protege, a shrewd commoner named Thomas Cromwell.
5	5	"Arise, My Lord"	c. 1526–1527	Brian Kirk	Michael Hirst	29 April 2007	0.592
King Henry is stunned by a reversal in his alliance with Emperor Charles and forced to look elsewhere for European support, while Anne Boleyn refuses his offer to make her his mistress, inflaming his desire to marry her. Katherine of Aragon's alliance with Charles and her hatred for Cardinal Wolsey intensify. Wolsey urges appealing to Clement VII because the English bishops do not approve of the annulment of Henry's marriage to Catherine. Charles Brandon and the newly-widowed Margaret Tudor marry secretly, which infuriates the King, and he banishes both of them from court. Henry bestows a dukedom on his illegitimate son Henry FitzRoy, but is heartbroken when FitzRoy dies only weeks later. Rome is sacked by Charles V.
6	6	"True Love"	c. 1527	Brian Kirk	Michael Hirst	6 May 2007	0.599
As Henry VIII gains in confidence, his displeasure with the way the Catholic church handles his request for an annulment of his marriage to Katherine of Aragon grows. As a result, Cardinal Wolsey's position is weakening, leaving him vulnerable to his enemies. Having restored Henry's former alliance with the French King Francis, Wolsey attempts to convene a conclave of the cardinals in France, beyond the reach of Emperor Charles's influence, to decide on the matter. But the cardinals refuse to come - on orders from the Pope, who remains the Emperor's captive. In return for securing his return to court and reconciliation with the King, Charles Brandon makes a reluctant alliance with the Duke of Norfolk and the Boleyn family.
7	7	"Message to the Emperor"	1528	Alison Maclean	Michael Hirst	13 May 2007	0.460
William Compton dies of the "sweating sickness" at Compton Wynates, his house in Warwickshire. As Henry VIII receives positive news of his war against Emperor Charles, the sickness spreads like a wildfire. Henry flees the palace and London, and starts having doubts about the future and his ability to rule the country. Both Anne Boleyn and Cardinal Wolsey are stricken with the disease, but recover. Wolsey sends agents to the exiled Pope asking him to make a favourable decision on Henry's 'Great Matter' but Clement instead sends his legate, legate Cardinal Campeggio, to make a final decision in England.
8	8	"Truth and Justice"	1528	Alison Maclean	Michael Hirst	20 May 2007	0.424
The Pope's legate Cardinal Campeggio arrives to hear the case for the annulment of Henry's marriage to Katherine of Aragon. Cardinal Wolsey intimidates Campeggio: "Let me make certain things plain to you. If you do not grant the King his divorce, papal authority in England will be annihilated!" Wolsey has assured Henry that the divorce will be granted, but the Pope and Campeggio are not so easily swayed. A desperate Wolsey begs Queen Katherine to give up the marriage, but she refuses. Wolsey's enemies circle; Anne Boleyn plants more doubt in Henry's mind about Wolsey, who soon threatens Campeggio both physically and politically. A legatine court convenes at Blackfriar's, and both Henry and Katherine plead their cases.
9	9	"Look to God First"	1529	Ciaran Donnelly	Michael Hirst	3 June 2007	0.396
The legatine trial as to the validity of King Henry's marriage to Katherine continues despite the queen's refusal to attend, but the papal envoy Campeggio receives notice to return to Rome and place the evidence before the Curia. The Pope procrastinates and Henry, goaded by the conspirators Thomas Boleyn, the Duke of Norfolk and Charles Brandon, strips Wolsey of his temporal power and properties, bans him from court and instructs him to take up his sole role as Archbishop of York. Thomas More reluctantly succeeds Wolsey as Lord Chancellor. Anne Boleyn, encouraged by her ally Thomas Cromwell (now the King's secretary), subtly asks the king to reacquaint himself with the subject of Lutheranism. Wolsey appeals to Cromwell for help, but reluctantly Cromwell turns his back on his former mentor. Margaret Tudor dies of tuberculosis, and her widower Charles Brandon shows repentance at her deathbed for his infidelity.
10	10	"The Death of Wolsey"	1530	Ciaran Donnelly	Michael Hirst	10 June 2007	0.465
Cardinal Wolsey, now acting solely as the Archbishop of York and living in relative poverty, is repudiated by Anne Boleyn and writes to Queen Katherine, trying to gain her support. Thomas More uses his new powers as Lord Chancellor and starts actively persecuting prominent Lutherans - including burning six of them at the stake, to the anger of Thomas Cromwell. King Henry finds his new Privy Counsellors less proficient than Wolsey was in running the country; he threatens to reinstate the cardinal, spurring Norfolk and Suffolk to find a way to finish off Wolsey. Henry has also found elements much to his liking in the teachings of Luther, and dispatches Cromwell to canvass various European faculties of theology, hopefully to obtain favourable opinions regarding his intended divorce. Wolsey's secret communication with the Queen is uncovered by Cromwell, and he is arrested by Charles Brandon and charged with high treason. His fall from grace now complete, Wolsey laments his decadent lifestyle and commits suicide in a jail cell en route to London. Anne Boleyn engages Henry in a sexual encounter, but forces him to perform coitus interruptus after which a furious Henry storms off.

=== Season 2 (2008) ===
The season two premiere of The Tudors attracted 768,000 viewers to the original broadcast, with an additional 254,000 viewing the reaired broadcast the same night.

List of The Tudors season 2 episodes
No. overall	No. in season	Title	Setting	Directed by	Written by	Original release date	US viewers (millions)
11	1	"Everything Is Beautiful"	1532	Jeremy Podeswa	Michael Hirst	30 March 2008	0.768
As he seeks the annulment of his marriage to Catherine of Aragon, King Henry VIII seeks to appoint himself head of the Church of England. Anne Boleyn insists that Henry remove Queen Catherine from Court. The new Pope Paul III, not wanting to displease either the king or the Emperor, suggests that Boleyn instead be assassinated. Lutheran clergyman Thomas Cranmer, newly arrived at Court, receives a promotion as the king's chaplain at the behest of Cromwell and the Boleyns. Thomas and George Boleyn bribe a cook to poison the food of Catherine's strongest supporter, Bishop of Rochester John Fisher; however, the bishop survives and the cook, Richard Roose, is boiled alive. King Henry banishes the Queen from court. The Spanish ambassador, Eustace Chapuys, is seen discussing the assassination of Anne with an unknown, hooded man.
12	2	"Tears of Blood"	1532	Jeremy Podeswa	Michael Hirst	6 April 2008	N/A
As the Catholic Church struggles to control Henry VIII's demands for an annulment, the King appoints himself head of the Church of England; initial protests are stifled when Archbishop of Canterbury William Warham officially submits the clergy to Henry. Anne Boleyn insists that Henry break all contacts with Catherine. The Reformation has begun; depressed by his failure to prevent it, Sir Thomas More resigns as Henry's Chancellor. Charles Brandon's growing hatred for the Boleyns - and his mistrust of Cromwell - causes him to abandon his alliance with them, losing him the King's favour again. Anne is created Marquess of Pembroke before she and Henry visit France to present Anne as the future Queen of England and Henry's future wife. After talks between both Henry and Anne and the French King to secure his support, Anne finally submits sexually to Henry, asking him to help her conceive the son and heir, narrowly avoiding another encounter with the Imperial-hired assassin.
13	3	"Checkmate"	1533	Colm McCarthy	Michael Hirst	13 April 2008	N/A
Henry destroys all ties with authority and the past. After failed attempts to have his marriage to Catherine annulled by the Catholic Church, Henry runs out of patience and marries the pregnant Anne Boleyn in secret. He appoints the young Lutheran Thomas Cranmer to succeed the deceased William Warham as Archbishop of Canterbury and strips Queen Catherine of her title and status, along with Princess Mary; they are henceforth to be known as the Princess Dowager of Wales and the Lady Mary. The Act of Restrain of Appeals is presented to Parliament by Cromwell and passes. Henry gives the position of Chancellor to the pro-Lutheran Thomas Cromwell. Anne Boleyn is crowned Queen before a small crowd, and escapes an assassination attempt. Pope Paul III threatens to excommunicate the king and the church of England if Henry does not return to Catherine; Henry tears the papal edict in half. Henry is also disappointed when Anne gives birth to a daughter, Elizabeth, instead of his desired son, and soon resumes his philandering with ladies of the court despite assuring Anne they will still have a son.
14	4	"The Act of Succession"	1534	Colm McCarthy	Michael Hirst	20 April 2008	N/A
Questions of faith dominate the court. As the infant Princess Elizabeth is baptised, Thomas Cromwell unveils the 'Act of Succession', ruling that only children of Henry and Anne are legitimate successors to the English throne. A law is passed where every royal subject must take an oath, on pain of death, recognising the validity of the King's new marriage and the supremacy of Henry VIII over the Church. Although Charles Brandon reluctantly does so – thus restoring him to the King's favour – Bishop Fisher and Sir Thomas More refuse and are imprisoned in the Tower. Catherine lives now in total seclusion, and Lady Mary is sent to be maid to the baby Princess Elizabeth, her half-sister. Anne soon discovers the identity of the King's new mistress and secretly has her brother George banish her. Pregnant again, Anne, at her father's prompting, tacitly approves of the king's infidelity while she is with child, albeit with those of her own choosing.
15	5	"His Majesty's Pleasure"	1535	Ciaran Donnelly	Michael Hirst	27 April 2008	N/A
Attempts to legitimise the King's marriage encounter obstacles as Sir Thomas More and Cardinal Fisher insist that only Christ can head of the church, but both of them are arrested. Meanwhile Henry's eye continues to roam. Queen Anne miscarries her child and fears that the king has lost his love for her. She also fears Lady Mary and Catherine of Aragon, for she feels that Henry may still designate Mary as heir over her own daughter, Elizabeth. Anne's relationship with her elder sister Mary deteriorates when Mary marries a commoner in secret, without asking her permission and becomes pregnant; Anne has the pair banished from court when pressured by her father. Imprisoned in the Tower, Cardinal Fisher and Sir Thomas More face execution unless they take the Oath of Supremacy. Both still refuse, even after More receives pleas from his family, and are found guilty of high treason and beheaded. Catherine of Aragon's health begins to fail.
16	6	"The Definition of Love"	c. 1535	Ciaran Donnelly	Michael Hirst	4 May 2008	0.649
As the Reformation gathers pace, Thomas Cromwell becomes more powerful as propagandist-in-chief. Henry is haunted by the memory of the executed More, while Queen Anne's insecurities grow. Her husband's affairs continue and an attempt to have her daughter Elizabeth betrothed to Charles II of Orléans (a French prince) fails when the French King refuses to recognise the infant Princess's legitimacy; Anne's interference with policies both foreign and domestic also angers the King, as he expected her to play a more submissive role. Fractures begin to appear in Henry and Anne's marriage. Charles Brandon feels remorse for being unfaithful to his wife, but resumes his friendship with the King.
17	7	"Matters of State"	1536	Dearbhla Walsh	Michael Hirst	11 May 2008	N/A
As Cromwell's ruthless reforms spread terror through the Catholic Church, Anne has nightmares that her position is under threat from former Queen Catherine and her daughter Mary. Catherine's death removes much of the perceived illegitimacy of Anne's position, and a passionate sexual encounter with Henry seems to heal the rift with her husband. However, her quarrels with her former ally Cromwell alarm her father and brother. Meanwhile Henry is occupied by the news of Catherine's death and later has an encounter with Jane Seymour. Anne announces to her father that she is pregnant with a son.
18	8	"Lady in Waiting"	Spring 1536	Dearbhla Walsh	Michael Hirst	18 May 2008	N/A
At Henry's command Jane Seymour is made a lady-in-waiting to Anne, to the discomfort of the Queen. Emperor Charles indicates through Chapuys his interest in renewing relations with England. However he insists on Lady Mary being legitimised as Henry's heir, something Cromwell knows Anne will oppose. When Henry is seriously injured while jousting, thoughts turn to who might succeed him. After he recovers, Anne finds Henry kissing Jane, and then has another miscarriage – of a son. Infuriated by yet another failed pregnancy, Henry declares to Cromwell that his marriage with Anne is null and void, saying he was 'bewitched' into marrying her.
19	9	"The Act of Treason"	17 May 1536	Jon Amiel	Michael Hirst	25 May 2008	0.670
Anne has lost her son and her last chance at a lasting marriage with Henry. The King's affections are shifting: the Seymour family are given rooms at court near the King's and replace the Boleyns as royal favourites. Anne's behaviour becomes more erratic as she is urged by her family to regain favour. Several members of the court, including Charles Brandon, begin to move against her, accusing her of adultery and witchcraft. Arrests are made of suspected lovers, and eventually of Anne herself. Cromwell tortures some of the scapegoats to force a false confession. Except for Thomas Wyatt all of the accused, including the Queen, are sentenced to death. Four of Anne's supposed lovers, including her trusted friend Mark Smeaton and her brother George, are executed, while a grief-stricken Anne awaits her fate.
20	10	"Destiny and Fortune"	18–19 May 1536	Jon Amiel	Michael Hirst	1 June 2008	0.852
As Anne awaits her death, Henry visits Jane Seymour and asks for her hand in marriage. The declaration of his marriage to Anne null and void means that their daughter Elizabeth becomes illegitimate and no longer in line to the throne, clearing the way for a legitimate heir to come from his new marriage. Lady Mary, delighted at Anne's fall, hopes she will soon be reconciled with her father. Earl Thomas Boleyn is expelled from court. Archbishop Cranmer is still Anne's ally, but he can do nothing for her except promise to protect her daughter and take her final confession, in which she maintains that she was never unfaithful. Despite the roles they played in bringing Anne and her family down, both Charles Brandon and Cromwell show some remorse, feeling that death is too harsh a punishment. Anne is beheaded, going to her death with dignity and some sympathy from the onlookers. Henry breakfasts and looks forward to his third marriage, indifferent to the death of his second queen.

=== Season 3 (2009) ===
The third season of The Tudors premiered on 5 April 2009, and attracted 726,000 viewers in the United States, which was a five per cent decrease from the previous season's premiere. The premiere bested HBO's In Treatment season two premiere which drew 657,000 viewers, and marks one of the few times that a Showtime original received more viewers than an HBO original. The season finale aired on 24 May 2009, and the original broadcast attained 366,000 viewers.

List of The Tudors season 3 episodes
No. overall	No. in season	Title	Setting	Directed by	Written by	Original release date	US viewers (millions)
21	1	"Civil Unrest"	30 May 1536	Ciaran Donnelly	Michael Hirst	5 April 2009	0.726
Days after Anne Boleyn's execution, King Henry VIII weds a third time, to shy, demure Jane Seymour – a union that he prays will produce a male heir. The ambassador of the Holy Roman Emperor, Eustace Chapuys, hopes to earn Queen Jane's help in securing a reconciliation between Henry and Lady Mary. Secretly Thomas Cromwell and Lord Rich worry about their plans for a religious reformation. Lady Ursula Misseldon arrives to wait upon the Queen, and soon becomes mistress to Sir Francis Bryan. Jane invites Lady Rochford back to court to be one of her ladies. Mary is threatened with death unless she submits to her father's authority, renouncing Rome and acknowledging that her mother's union with her father was incestuous and never legal within the eyes of God nor Man. Under guidance from Chapuys, she comes to the realisation she has no other options and reluctantly complies, while vowing to never forgive herself. When prompted by Cromwell, Henry refuses to provide for Lady Elizabeth's care, claiming she is not his daughter. Henry tells a stunned Jane that he is displeased that she is not yet with child. A number of Catholics in northern England rebel against the dissolution of the monasteries, enraging Henry.
22	2	"The Northern Uprising"	Winter 1536	Ciaran Donnelly	Michael Hirst	12 April 2009	N/A
The rebellion now known as the Pilgrimage of Grace begins in earnest, with King Henry dispatching Charles Brandon to deal with the uprising. The rebels are determined to restore the monasteries and reinstate Catholic practices within England. Darcy surrenders Pontefract Castle to Robert Aske against Henry's direct orders. Bedridden due to his painful leg wound that is further aggravated by his jousting injury, Henry takes a new mistress, Lady Ursula Misseldon, out of continued frustration at Jane's lack of pregnancy. Upon Henry's recovery, Jane reintroduces Lady Mary to court in a bid to see her restored to the succession. Henry offers pardons to the rebels on condition that they lay down their arms and continue negotiations with Brandon. Jane attempts to get Henry to restore the abbeys, but he again warns her not to meddle in his affairs and refers to what happened to Anne Boleyn as a warning. The Catholic Church conspires to get Lady Mary or another loyal Catholic on the English throne. The King tells Brandon to tell the rebels whatever he wants during negotiations, since he does not intend to keep his word. The rebels, believing they have won, disband and rejoice.
23	3	"Dissension and Punishment"	1536–1537	Ciaran Donnelly	Michael Hirst	19 April 2009	N/A
Queen Jane and Lady Mary bring the toddler Lady Elizabeth to court, where Henry lovingly reconciles with her. The King makes promises to the rebel leader Robert Aske of pardons and redress of grievances to the participants in the Pilgrimage of Grace, while promising to crown Jane at York. Lady Mary wishes Aske luck in the Pilgrimage, whereupon he reveals to her that many still wish her to inherit the crown. Edward Seymour reveals to a hurt Jane that their father died over a week ago, without her knowledge. Aske returns to the rest of the Pilgrimage rebels to discuss their options, but many of them mistrust the King's promises and vow to rise again. Jane finds out Henry has taken a mistress, but declares that a woman must honour and obey her husband. Henry uses a renewal of the uprising as an excuse to have the rebels attacked, impose martial law in the North, and to have the Pilgrimage leaders put to death. Jane reveals to Henry that she is with child. The remaining leaders not involved in the second uprising are taken to London, where they are interrogated by Cromwell before being executed. Charles Brandon, already tormented by his role in the execution of Pilgrimage leaders, is ordered to return North to execute more rebels - man, women, and children - to make an example of them.
24	4	"The Death of a Queen"	July–October 1537	Ciaran Donnelly	Michael Hirst	26 April 2009	N/A
Aske is condemned to be executed in York as an example to others. More Pilgrimage participants are put to death, but Charles Brandon is haunted by the mercilessness of the suppression and his role in it. Jane is angered at Cromwell for taking bribes from nobles in exchange for old abbeys as properties; her brother explains that it makes both Henry and Cromwell rich while ensuring continued loyalty from the nobles. The last rebel leader is executed in York, in front of a regretful Brandon. Emperor Charles V engages Henry in negotiations for Lady Mary's hand in marriage on behalf of one of his subjects. Mary rejoices in the potential marriage match, but despairs over the failed Pilgrimage and accompanying deaths. Jane requests that Lady Ursula comfort the King if anything should happen to her. She has a long and difficult birth, supported by Lady Mary. At one point, he considers sacrificing Jane to save the baby; however, eventually a healthy son is born and is named Edward. Henry's joy is short-lived, as Jane falls ill of puerperal fever within days. Henry begs God to save her, but she dies, bringing back memories of his own mother's death from the same affliction.
25	5	"Problems in the Reformation"	1537–1538	Jeremy Podeswa	Michael Hirst	3 May 2009	N/A
An agent of Cromwell is assassinated, causing him to begin an investigation, since he has countless enemies at court. More disorder and murder follow, while a devastated Henry continues his seclusion with his jester Will Sommers while mourning the Queen's death, and planning a new palace to occupy himself. Lady Mary insists that she only has one family, and thus loves her half-sister Lady Elizabeth, and her half-brother Prince Edward. However, she later decides to leave court for her estate in Hunston with Elizabeth as she worries that her father's court isn't safe for either at the moment now that Jane has died. Bryan attempts to assassinate Cardinal Reginald Pole in France, but he escapes. Charles Brandon and his wife struggle to come to terms with his role in the suppression of the Pilgrimage, leading her to disclose that she regrets being pregnant, since her child will be haunted by the ghosts of the executed rebels. Edward Seymour confronts Bryan about his affair with his wife and warns him to stay away from Seymour's nephew, the Prince. Cromwell struggles to keep control over the court and eventually tells the King that he should consider remarriage. Henry resolves that he cannot harm Pole from afar, but can make him suffer through his family. Cromwell is disturbed when Henry implements new heresy laws. Henry seeks to end his depression by sleeping with Lady Ursula one more time before she returns to her home town.
26	6	"Search for a New Queen"	1538–1539	Jeremy Podeswa	Michael Hirst	10 May 2009	N/A
Cromwell loses more power as Henry appoints Charles Brandon as Lord President of the Council to rule in Henry's absence. Edward Seymour arrests the Countess of Salisbury and the rest of the Pole family for treason. Matchmaking begins, with Henry looking to Mary de Longueville, currently betrothed to his nephew King James V of Scotland, or Christina of Milan. Cromwell schemes to secure Henry a Protestant bride from Germany, either Amelia or Anne of Cleves. Henry pursues Christina of Milan, but his reputation precedes him, leading to her rejection unless she is ordered by the Emperor to marry. Henry discloses his fears to Brandon of the threat from the Poles because of their Plantagenet blood. Henry's leg ulcer becomes life-threatening and Brandon decides that a risky procedure should be carried out on the King. Henry discovers Mary de Longueville has already married and that there is resistance to the Christina of Milan match. Lady Mary despairs at the imprisonment of the Countess of Salisbury and the execution of her son, expressing her desire to have Cromwell burned as an agent of Satan. Henry confronts Cromwell about his loyalties. The Countess of Salisbury and her grandson are executed, to get back at Reginald Pole and extinguish Plantagenet blood from England.
27	7	"Protestant Anne of Cleves"	1539–1540	Jeremy Podeswa	Michael Hirst	17 May 2009	N/A
Hans Holbein is sent to Cleves to paint a portrait of Anne of Cleves, which Henry approves of greatly when he sees it. With backing from Rome, war looms with France and the Empire aligning against England. Eventually, Henry agrees to marriage negotiations with Cleves. However, they run into difficulties with Anne's brother, Duke William, who discloses that Anne is still formally promised to another. Henry confronts Chapuys about the Emperor's betrayal of France; Chapuys responds that the accord was already broken and Christina of Milan is still available as a match for Henry, which Henry angrily rejects as he feels that he has been used as a pawn. Henry proposes no dowry for Anne to expedite a marriage, which Duke William accepts, while noting the formal betrothal was never confirmed. Mary is outraged at a potential Protestant marriage for herself and her father, wishing Anne might drown at sea. Sir Francis Bryan is again sent abroad to assassinate Cardinal Pole. Henry obsesses over meeting Anne and resolves to meet her earlier than planned; however he is left severely disappointed by their first meeting. An angry Henry tells Cromwell "I like her not!" and demands an end to the betrothal. Cromwell discloses a renewed accord between Spain and France, making the match a political necessity. Brandon suggests to Henry that Cromwell is overreaching his powers. After attempts to find a way out, Henry reluctantly marries Anne, but fails to consummate the marriage because he finds Anne repulsive. She in turn finds aspects of Henry repulsive.
28	8	"The Undoing of Cromwell"	Spring – 28 July 1540	Jeremy Podeswa	Michael Hirst	24 May 2009	0.366
Henry moves swiftly to annul his loveless marriage to Anne of Cleves, claiming the marriage is invalid due to her precontract. Anne tells Lady Mary that a potential match, her cousin Duke Philip of Bavaria, is coming to court her; Mary is reluctant due to their differing religions. When Mary meets him, she is smitten. Sir Francis Bryan conspires with Seymour and Brandon to find someone to "occupy" the King to alleviate his current lack of sexual satisfaction: 17-year-old Katherine Howard. Mary falls in love with Duke Philip in spite of their differing faiths, while Katherine Howard is brought to court and immediately captivates Henry. Brandon warns Henry that Cromwell is stalling Anglo-French negotiations. Henry secretly visits Katherine Howard and beds her. Brandon, Seymour, and others plot Cromwell's downfall, culminating in his fall from favour, which is sudden and dramatic and leads to his imprisonment for treason. Mary is heartbroken when Duke Philip is sent away from court by Henry. Henry sends Queen Anne to Richmond while a bill of attainder is introduced against Cromwell. He pleads for mercy and helps the King annul his marriage to Anne, who is told by Seymour that her marriage has been found invalid. Cromwell is executed.

=== Season 4 (2010) ===
On 10 April 2009, it was announced that Showtime had picked up The Tudors for a fourth and final season, which contained ten episodes and began airing on 11 April 2010.

Maria Doyle Kennedy, Natalie Dormer, and Annabelle Wallis reprise their roles as Catherine of Aragon, Anne Boleyn, and Jane Seymour, respectively, in individual dream sequences in the final episode.

List of The Tudors season 4 episodes
No. overall	No. in season	Title	Setting	Directed by	Written by	Original release date	US viewers (millions)
29	1	"Moment of Nostalgia"	Summer 1540	Dearbhla Walsh	Michael Hirst	11 April 2010	0.883
Whitehall Palace, London 1540. Over thirty years into the reign of Henry VIII, London is experiencing a hot summer with no rain for two months. But the King’s vigour remains undiminished. The rivalry between Catholics and Lutherans continues, led by Bishop of Winchester and Lord Edward Seymour. Henry introduces his new wife to court, Katherine Howard, his fifth Queen, who is only seventeen years old. She attempts to befriend Henry's children; this succeeds with his young son, Prince Edward, but she receives only contempt from Lady Mary while Lady Elizabeth is receptive but prefers to spend time with Henry's former wife Anne of Cleves. Meanwhile, Charles Brandon and his wife Catherine have separated after Charles's actions in the Pilgrimage of Grace. Joan Bulmer, the new Queen’s childhood friend, is hired as a lady in waiting; she knows scandalous details about Katherine’s past. The Queen’s most notable admirer is the King’s new groom Thomas Culpeper, who makes no secret of his desire for the Queen. During a hunting visit by the royal entourage, Culpeper rapes a peasant woman and then murders her husband. The King and Queen go on a trip to Berkshire where it finally rains again.
30	2	"Sister"	Winter 1540	Dearbhla Walsh	Michael Hirst	18 April 2010	0.740
Culpeper continues to desire Katherine, while the King spoils her with extravagant gifts daily. Meanwhile, Lady Rochford listens to the scandalous gossip about her new mistress’s past from Bulmer. At Christmas and the New Year, Henry invites Anne of Cleves to the palace and showers Katherine with numerous gifts. Lady Mary continues to be cold towards Queen Katherine while Henry is surprised by Anne of Cleves' beauty and graciousness. The ageing King goes to bed early, leaving Anne of Cleves and Queen Katherine to talk about how Anne sees Elizabeth as a surrogate daughter. Henry continues to suffer from the wound in his leg while Anne and Katherine dance together, much to Lady Mary's dismay. While Edward Seymour is in the north of England, his wife sleeps with Thomas Seymour. Lady Mary and Katherine express their mutual dislike and the Queen removes two of Mary's ladies. Later, Lady Rochford sleeps with Culpeper and he reveals his desire for the Queen; she offers to help him seduce Katherine. Henry's leg desperately needs draining and his councillors begin to discuss what should happen if he dies, leading him to lash out at them; meanwhile, unable to see him due to his illness, Queen Katherine fears that he has taken a mistress. Lord Surrey plots against the Seymour brothers, whom he considers upstarts. With the help of Bulmer and Lady Rochford, Queen Katherine sees Culpeper late at night.
31	3	"Something for You"	Spring 1541	Dearbhla Walsh	Michael Hirst	25 April 2010	0.890
King Henry finally reunites with the young Queen Katherine and is buoyed by her happiness. He pardons a criminal, gives blessings and alms to the poor, visits Lady Elizabeth who is staying with Anne of Cleves in Hever Castle. and plans a visit to the North of England, for which Charles Brandon is ordered to make preparations. Katherine begins a flirtation with Culpeper. Henry takes his pleasure in the bed of Anne of Cleves, the ex-wife he once thought ugly. A large entourage accompanies the King, Queen and Lady Mary to the city of Lincoln for the royal visit. In appreciation of the warm welcome, Henry forgives the city for its earlier revolt. The King longs to be with his young bride but his troublesome leg makes him tired and irritable and confines him to his room. Culpepper continues his sexual relationship with the Queen.
32	4	"Natural Ally"	Summer – Autumn 1541	Ciarán Donnelly	Michael Hirst	2 May 2010	0.902
Henry and his entourage are welcomed at Pontefract Castle as Henry continues to receive a warm reception from his subjects during his tour of the north. However, Charles Brandon is haunted by the memory of his deeds quelling the rebellion. Henry has Katherine brought to his chambers to resume their sexual relationship. Afterwards, Katherine sneaks off to sleep with Culpeper again. Francis Dereham, one of the men Katherine had sexual liaisons with before she married the King, arrives at court, and demands a job from Katherine; blackmailed by him, she agrees. Charles continues to struggle with the effects of being back in the north, seeing ghosts of the men he betrayed on Henry's orders. Katherine lashes out at Culpeper after Dereham enters her service. Prince Edward becomes grievously ill while Dereham brags about his previous closeness with the Queen. After being snubbed by the King of the Scots, Henry rushes to Prince Edward when hearing of his illness. Prince Edward recovers, and Henry orders that thanks be given for his son and for his wife Katherine.
33	5	"Bottom of the Pot"	Winter 1541 – 13 February 1542	Ciarán Donnelly	Michael Hirst	9 May 2010	0.929
The King receives an anonymous letter accusing his wife of past sexual relationships with two men, including Francis Dereham. Henry suspects it is a malicious fraud but orders Lord Hertford to investigate. Queen Katherine is confined to her apartments. Dereham is arrested and interrogated; Joan Bulmer is questioned, as is the Dowager Duchess of Norfolk, at whose home Joan and Katherine lived as young women. Dereham confesses that he and Katherine had planned to get married and that he knew her carnally before she became Queen, but denies subsequent adultery. Henry weeps when told of these discoveries. Katherine is removed from court. Her pleas for mercy are ignored. Francis Dereham is tortured as Lord Hertford seeks to establish whether Katherine committed adultery. Dereham denies the charge but accuses Culpeper, who is arrested. Henry isolates himself from his court. Katherine, Culpeper, Dereham and Lady Rochford are all executed. The King gives a banquet, attended only by 26 beautiful young women.
34	6	"You Have My Permission"	1542	Ciarán Donnelly	Michael Hirst	16 May 2010	0.820
The King orders an Act of Parliament to restore the succession of his two daughters, Lady Mary and Lady Elizabeth. Recalling Katherine's fate, Elizabeth vows that she will never marry. The King dispatches both Hertford and his enemy the Earl of Surrey north to warn the King of Scotland that any further aggression will be responded to by England’s armies, leading to the Battle of Solway Moss. Meanwhile, the ambassadors of both France and of the Holy Roman Empire seek the support of England. Henry sides with the Catholic Emperor for the first time since he was married to Catherine of Aragon. Bishop Stephen Gardiner hunts for suspected Calvinists. Henry takes an interest in the twice-married Catherine Parr. She wishes to marry Thomas Seymour, but within hours of her husband’s death, Seymour is transferred to Brussels as Ambassador, and the King proposes marriage.
35	7	"Sixth and the Final Wife"	1543	Jeremy Podeswa	Michael Hirst	23 May 2010	0.948
Henry marries Catherine Parr, his sixth wife. The wedding is notable for the presence of Henry’s daughters, Lady Mary and Lady Elizabeth. Catherine is determined to be a loving stepmother to the King’s children. Plans are made for the invasion of France, with Suffolk as commander of the English army, following the alliance with the Emperor Charles. As the Catholic influence at court increases, Bishop Gardiner begins to investigate the new Queen’s religious beliefs. Preparations are made to take guns, wagons, horses and the army to France and a siege of Boulogne begins. The King appoints Catherine to be regent in his absence, protector of the realm and guardian of his children. The Queen regent is well liked and respected.
36	8	"As It Should Be"	1544	Jeremy Podeswa	Michael Hirst	6 June 2010	0.991
In 1544, in Henry's presence, the Earl of Surrey and his men attempt to undermine French fortifications at Boulogne. The King entertains in style at his tent. Over two thousand of the English army die of disease and starvation and another three thousand fall ill as ‘the flux’ sweeps the camp. When hope seems lost, engineer Treviso explodes a mine that brings down part of the city walls. The French surrender to Henry, who returns to England in triumph. Charles Brandon finds love with a young French woman prisoner, Brigitte, who comes to England with him from France. Henry decides not to advance further into France. Bishop Gardiner vows to destroy the queen. Henry is angry when the Emperor concludes a separate peace with France. Mary vows that, if ever she becomes queen, she will make England Catholic once again. An increasingly frail Henry hears that a French army is marching on Boulogne.
37	9	"Secrets of the Heart"	1545–1546	Ciarán Donnelly	Michael Hirst	13 June 2010	0.724
The Earl of Surrey loses 600 men in an unprovoked battle in France, endangering Henry’s recent success at Boulogne. News arrives that the King of France is preparing for war, and that Emperor Charles, England’s ally, has seized English ships and properties. A Catholic, Wriothesley is appointed Lord Chancellor. A female Lutheran preacher, Anne Askew, is imprisoned, tortured by Wriothesley and then burnt at the stake. Sir Richard Rich brings Lady Mary news that her friend and confidant Eustace Chapuys is dead. Gardiner and his allies determine to trap Queen Catherine. The bishop tells the King that he has proof of her heresy. Henry replies that even if this were true, he would spare her life. The Earl of Surrey fails to convince the Privy Council with his explanation of how so many men were lost in France. His rank is withdrawn and the King refuses to see him. Surrey is arrested on charges of treason, and sentenced to death.
38	10	"Death of a Monarchy"	January 1547	Ciarán Donnelly	Michael Hirst	20 June 2010	0.682
Henry is forced to surrender Boulogne as part of a peace treaty with France. King Francis is dying, and Henry remains in poor health; factions are forming at court as thoughts turn towards the succession. Gardiner prepares an arrest warrant for Queen Catherine for heresy; when Wriothesley and his men come to arrest the Queen, they are sent away by Henry. Bishop Gardiner is expelled from court, and Wriothesley switches his allegiance to Seymour. Hearing that Charles Brandon is ill, the King summons him to court; Brandon dies soon after. Henry commissions artist Hans Holbein to do a portrait of him, but rejects the realistic depiction and demands that Holbein repaint it. He sees ghosts of his past wives: Catherine of Aragon, who tells him that Mary should have married and had children; Anne Boleyn, who maintains her innocence, and Jane Seymour, who tells him she is upset at young Edward being shut away, and that he will die young. Realising his own death is imminent, Henry sends Queen Catherine and his daughters Mary and Elizabeth away, saying he will not see them again. Queen Catherine and Lady Mary weep outside Henry's chamber, but Elizabeth strides away. Henry is called to see his new portrait, which he approves. As he leaves the room, the fates of Henry's children are briefly explained and it is noted that the Tudor dynasty produced the two most famous monarchs in English history: Henry VIII and Elizabeth I.

== Home media ==
Season	Episodes	DVD release date			
Season	Episodes	Region 1	Region 2	Region 4	Discs
Season 1	10	8 January 2008	10 December 2007		4
Season 2	10	11 November 2008 (Canada); 6 January 2009 (United States)	13 October 2008		4
Season 3	8	10 November 2009 (Canada); 15 December 2009 (United States)	7 December 2009		3
Season 4	10	12 October 2010 (United States); 9 November 2010 (Canada)	21 March 2011		3

== See also ==
- Assertio Septem Sacramentorum, book by Henry VIII (Season 1, Episode 4)
