= Stenham =

Stenham is a surname. Notable people with the surname include:

- Cob Stenham (1932–2006), British businessman
- Polly Stenham (born 1986), English playwright
