= Margaret Tudor (disambiguation) =

Margaret Tudor (1489–1541) was a queen of Scotland and princess of England.

Margaret Tudor may also refer to:

- Margaret Tudor (The Tudors), a character on The Tudors

== See also ==
- Margaret Beaufort, Countess of Richmond and Derby (1443–1509) of the House of Tudor, mother of Henry VII
