= Nick Dunning =

English actor (born 1957)

- Born: Nicholas Dunning; 1957 (age 68–69); London, England
- Spouse: Lise-Anne McLaughlin 1992 – present

Nick Dunning (born 1957 in London) is an English actor. His credits include The Young Ones (1982), Minder (1993), Boon (1995), Coronation Street (1998), Midsomer Murders episode Death's Shadow (1999), Kavanagh QC (2001), Alexander (2004), The Tudors (2007), for which he won an IFTA award for Best Supporting Actor. He has also appeared in Waking the Dead (2007), The Iron Lady (2011), Da Vinci's Demons (2013–2015), and Father Brown (2017).

== Personal life and education ==
Dunning attended a private school in London, then a comprehensive school in Leicester. He attended RADA, graduating with Acting (RADA Diploma) in 1977. Dunning has been married to Lise-Anne McLaughlin since 1992, and they live in Dalkey, Dublin.

== Career ==
He has appeared on stage in the West End in London and at the Gate Theatre in Dublin. He has won two Irish Times Theatre Awards. He has worked with the Royal Shakespeare Company, the Royal National Theatre and the Royal Court Theatre. His early television credits include The Young Ones (1982), Minder (1993), Boon (1995), Coronation Street (1998), and the Midsomer Murders episode Death's Shadow (1999), Kavanagh QC (2001), and Waking the Dead (2007). He played General Attalus in Alexander (2004), alongside Colin Farrell, Anthony Hopkins, Angelina Jolie, and Val Kilmer.

Dunning played the role of Thomas Boleyn in the Showtime original series, The Tudors (2007), for which he won an IFTA award for Best Supporting Actor. He starred in the film The Iron Lady (2011).

== Selected filmography ==
- The Firm (1989)
- The Young Ones (1982),
- Minder (1993),
- Boon (1995)
- Coronation Street (1998)
- Kavanagh QC (2001)
- Alexander (2004) – Attalus
- Malice Aforethought (2005)
- Fifty Dead Men Walking (2007)
- My Boy Jack (2007)
- The Tudors (2007) – Thomas Boleyn, 1st Earl of Wiltshire
- Injustice (2011)
- The Iron Lady (2011)
- Hatfields & McCoys (2012) – Reverend Garrett
- Quirke (2014)
- Da Vinci's Demons (2013–2015) – Lupo Mercuri
- Father Brown (2017) – William Bayley – episode "The Fire in the Sky"
- Blue Lights (2025) - Richard Robinson
