= No quarter (disambiguation) =

No quarter, no mercy shown by a victor, who treats a vanquished opponent very harshly or refuses to spare a surrendering opponent's life.

No quarter may also refer to:

== Arts, entertainment, and media ==
- "No Quarter" (song), a song by Led Zeppelin
  - No Quarter: Jimmy Page and Robert Plant Unledded, an album by Page and Plant named after the above song
- "No Quarter", a song by Scottish pirate folk metal band Alestorm from their album Black Sails at Midnight
- No Quarter, a 1932 book by Alec Waugh
- "No Quarter", an episode of the TV series Revolution
- No Quarter, a popular modification of the video game Wolfenstein: Enemy Territory (2003)
- "Le Père Milon", in English translated as "No Quarter", a short story by Guy de Maupassant

== Other uses ==
- No Quarter, the motto of the destroyer USS Leary (DD-879)
- No Quarter Pounder, an album by Dread Zeppelin
- Ordinance of no quarter to the Irish, a decree passed by the English Parliament in 1644

== See also ==
- Take no prisoners (disambiguation)
