= The Tudors =

Historical fiction television series

- Season 4 promotional banner
- Genre: Historical drama
- Created by: Michael Hirst
- Written by: Michael Hirst
- Starring: Jonathan Rhys Meyers; Henry Cavill; Sam Neill; Callum Blue; Henry Czerny; Natalie Dormer; Maria Doyle Kennedy; Nick Dunning; Jeremy Northam; Anthony Brophy; James Frain; Jamie Thomas King; Hans Matheson; Peter O'Toole; Annabelle Wallis; Alan Van Sprang; Gerard McSorley; Max von Sydow; Joss Stone; Tamzin Merchant; Lothaire Bluteau; Sarah Bolger; Max Brown; Torrance Coombs; David O'Hara; Joely Richardson
- Composer: Trevor Morris
- Countries of origin: United Kingdom; Canada; Ireland; United States
- Original language: English
- No. of seasons: 4
- No. of episodes: 38 (list of episodes)

Production
- Executive producers: Michael Hirst; Eric Fellner; Tim Bevan; Teri Weinberg; Sheila Hockin; Mritunjay Waghmare
- Producers: James Flynn; Gary Howsam
- Production location: Ireland
- Running time: 47–56 minutes
- Production companies: Reveille Eire; Working Title Television; Canadian Broadcasting Corporation; Octagon Entertainment; Peace Arch Entertainment; Showtime Networks; Screen Ireland

Original release
- Network: BBC Two (United Kingdom); CBC Television (Canada); Showtime (United States)
- Release: 1 April 2007 – 20 June 2010

The Tudors is an historical drama television series set primarily in 16th-century England, created and written by Michael Hirst and produced for the American premium cable television channel Showtime. The series was a collaboration among American, British, and Canadian producers, and was filmed mostly in Ireland. While named after the Tudor dynasty as a whole, it is based specifically upon the reign of King Henry VIII.

The series was produced by Peace Arch Entertainment for Showtime in association with Reveille Eire, Working Title Television, and the Canadian Broadcasting Corporation, and was filmed in Ireland. The first two episodes debuted on DirecTV, Time Warner Cable OnDemand, Netflix, Verizon FiOS On Demand, Internet Movie Database and on the website of the series before the official premiere on Showtime. The Tudors premiered on 1 April 2007; it was the highest-rated Showtime series in three years. In April 2007, the show was renewed for a second season, and the same month the BBC announced it had acquired exclusive broadcast rights for the series in the United Kingdom, which started to broadcast on 5 October 2007. The CBC began broadcasting the show on 2 October 2007.

Season Two debuted on Showtime on 30 March 2008, and on BBC Two on 1 August 2008. Production on Season Three began on 16 June 2008 in Bray, County Wicklow Ireland, and premiered on Showtime on 5 April 2009, while debuting in Canada on CBC on 30 September 2009. The day after broadcast, downloadable episodes debuted in Canada on MoboVivo.

Showtime announced on 13 April 2009 that it had renewed the show for a fourth and final season. The network ordered ten episodes that were first broadcast on 11 April 2010. The series finale was broadcast on 20 June 2010. The final season was shown in Canada on CBC between 22 September and 23 November 2010.

International distribution rights are owned by Sony Pictures Television.

== Synopsis ==
=== Season 1 ===
Season 1 chronicles the period of Henry VIII's reign in which his effectiveness as king is tested by international conflicts and political intrigue in his own court. Cardinal Thomas Wolsey plays a major part, acting as Henry's trusted advisor.

In episode 1, Wolsey persuades Henry to keep the peace with France, and the two kings meet at Calais to sign a pact of friendship. The pressure of wanting a male heir compels Henry to question his marriage to Catherine of Aragon. (Note: As established by the series credits and character list on the official website, the show spells the character's name with a "K".) He also has a string of affairs and fathers an illegitimate son in episode 2 with his mistress Elizabeth Blount, who is also one of Queen Catherine's ladies-in-waiting. Henry has the traitorous Duke of Buckingham executed.

Anne Boleyn returns from attending the French court, and she catches Henry's eye. Her father and uncle encourage her to seduce the king, though she also falls in love with Henry as the season unfolds. She refuses to become his mistress but insists that he marry her, which pushes him to use Cardinal Wolsey to take action against Queen Catherine. The king instructs Wolsey to get papal agreement for an annulment of his marriage, on the grounds that his wife's previous marriage, to Henry's elder brother Arthur, was indeed consummated. In episode 6, Wolsey makes increasingly desperate efforts to persuade the Catholic Church to grant this, but it proves difficult as a result of the influence wielded over the Pope by Katherine's nephew Emperor Charles V, and this starts to weaken Wolsey's position.

In episode 7, the mysterious sweating sickness arrives in England, killing both the high-born and low-born, and Henry is terrified of catching it; he secludes himself in the countryside away from court with his herbal medicines. Anne Boleyn contracts the illness but recovers. A papal envoy arrives in England to decide on the annulment. The court convenes a special session at which both Henry and Katherine initially are present, and it eventually decides in favor of Katherine. Cardinal Wolsey is stripped of his office as Lord Chancellor in episode 9 and banished to York, where he pleads with the king to restore him to office. Henry chooses his loyal friend Sir Thomas More to be Wolsey's successor as Lord Chancellor.

In the final episode, Wolsey makes one last desperate attempt to save himself by allying himself with his former enemy Queen Katherine, but their plot is discovered and Wolsey kills himself during his imprisonment in the Tower of London after saying a brief prayer apologising for his sins.

=== Season 2 ===
Henry will do whatever it takes to marry Anne Boleyn, even defying Pope Paul III. He prepares to take Anne on a royal visit to France, having demanded loyalty from the English clergy. The papacy in Rome organises an assassination plot against Anne, but this fails.

In episode 3 the newly appointed Archbishop of Canterbury Thomas Cranmer annuls Henry's marriage, clearing the way for Henry to marry the by now pregnant Anne, which also increases the growing rift between England and Rome. Bishop Fisher refuses to recognise the validity of Henry's marriage — after Henry issues a decree ordering all his subjects to recognise their new Queen — and is finally joined by Sir Thomas More, who is granted permission by Henry to retire from the chancellorship. In episode 5, Fisher and More's refusal to sign an oath of allegiance recognising Henry's supreme authority as head of the English church eventually leads to their execution.

In episode 6, Thomas Cromwell, who has become Henry's chief advisor, announces his plans to cleanse England of dissenters to the new regime. Also, England's relationship with France is complicated by King Francis's refusal to unite their kingdoms in marriage, thus causing Henry to question his decision to have married Anne. Episode 7 sees an increasingly ill and disillusioned Katherine, who has been forbidden to see her daughter, Lady Mary, and Cromwell has legislation approved by Parliament agreeing to the dissolution of first the smaller and then the larger abbeys and monasteries.

In episode 8, Henry has Cromwell initiate overtures to the Emperor to make peace with Rome as a bulwark against a hostile France, and the king starts to pay court to Jane Seymour after Anne's two miscarriages, which follow the birth of Princess Elizabeth. It is his long-time friend Charles Brandon who, with Cromwell, alerts Henry to Anne's apparent indiscretions, and her fate is sealed. She is conducted to the Tower of London, and her four supposed lovers, one of whom is her own brother, are executed, followed eventually by her own execution — delayed by some hours as a result of the French executioner's late arrival from Calais. Her devious father, who shows little remorse at the death of his son and Anne's impending death, is allowed to go free but is banished from court and is shown leaving the Tower without even acknowledging his daughter waving from her cell window.

On the morning of his queen's execution, Henry enjoys a lavish breakfast, symbolically consisting of the mate of a swan he has seen outside his window, as he looks forward to a new start and heirs with Jane Seymour.

=== Season 3 ===
The third season focuses on Henry's marriages to Jane Seymour and Anne of Cleves, the birth of his son Prince Edward, his ruthless suppression of the Pilgrimage of Grace, the downfall of Thomas Cromwell, and the beginnings of Henry's relationship with the free-spirited Catherine Howard.

Henry marries Jane as his third wife, but his honeymoon period is soon spoiled by a growing resentment against the Reformation in the north and east of England. The growing band of rebels disperses in Lincolnshire but gathers strength in Yorkshire, primarily because of its able leaders such as Robert Aske and Lord Darcy. The royal troops, commanded by the Duke of Suffolk, are severely outnumbered and are forced to parley, whilst on the Continent the papacy sends a newly appointed English cardinal to persuade the Spanish and French monarchs to support the English rebellion, called the Pilgrimage of Grace by its followers as their objective is to restore the old Catholic religious practices.

In episode 3, Henry is determined to stop at nothing to suppress the revolt, his fears stirred by remembrances of the Cornish uprising during his father's reign. He deceitfully persuades the rebel leaders to lay down their arms and disperse their followers, promising to hold a Parliament in York to answer all their grievances; this is never held. A second uprising is savagely suppressed and the leaders executed as Henry, via Cromwell, instructs Suffolk to shed quantities of blood to act as an example. Queen Jane goes into labour and produces a son, but she dies soon afterwards. In episode 5, Henry retires from public view, bereft at the loss of his queen, but finally emerges; his first act is to get the church leaders to agree on a new protestant doctrine.

In the ensuing episodes, the king has the last remaining Plantagenet heirs, the Pole family (mother, son, and grandson), put to death as a result of Reginald Pole's attempts to undermine his rule. This creates a schism with Spain and France, and at Cromwell's urging, Henry agrees to an alliance with the Protestant League by marrying Anne of Cleves after first dispatching the English Ambassador to Cleves to negotiate terms, followed by Hans Holbein, who is to paint her likeness. However, Cromwell's plans to bolster the Reformation are undone by Henry's dislike for Anne, whom he calls a 'Flanders mare'. He is unable to consummate his marriage and vents his frustration on Cromwell, which is encouraged by the Duke of Suffolk in league with Edward Seymour, as both want Cromwell removed from office. With his enemies encircling him, Cromwell pleads with Anne of Cleves to submit herself to her husband, but she is powerless to reduce King Henry's antipathy towards her. Finally, Cromwell is taken to the Tower after being accused of being a traitor by the King's Council and, despite writing a letter begging his master's forgiveness, is gruesomely beheaded by an executioner, hungover due to a prior night of drinking with Cromwell's enemies in a final act of vengeance. Only intervention by the commander of the guard delivers Cromwell from his agony.

In the meantime, Sir Francis Bryan is instructed by the Duke of Suffolk to find a woman to rekindle Henry's jaded love interest, and the beautiful and very young Catherine Howard, a relation of the Duke of Norfolk, is introduced at court and catches the King's interest. He beds her in secret, and a new romance begins.

=== Season 4 ===
The fourth and final season covers Henry's ill-fated marriage to Catherine Howard and his final, more congenial marriage to Catherine Parr. The ageing King seeks military glory by capturing Boulogne, France. In his final hours, he is troubled by the ghosts of his dead wives.

Henry marries 17-year-old Catherine Howard and is besotted by her beauty, calling her "his rose without a thorn", and feels rejuvenated. Catherine starts to dally with the King's groom, Thomas Culpepper, and is encouraged by her senior lady-in-waiting, Lady Rochford — Henry's sister-in-law via Anne Boleyn's brother — who is also being bedded by Culpepper. In episode 2, Henry invites his former wife, Anne of Cleves, to court to celebrate Christmas as he wants to reward her for keeping her word to him and for her loyalty. She, in turn, is grateful for the charity he has shown towards her. After the festivities, he is struck down once again by his leg wound — from his former jousting days — while Catherine is with Culpepper.

Feeling the need for company, Henry visits Anne of Cleves and has a brief liaison with her. He and Catherine embark on the royal Passage to the North to forgive the former rebels, accompanied by Princess Mary, who is popular with the King's northern subjects. It is during this period that Catherine and Culpepper consummate their relationship and Catherine falls in love with him. In episode 4, Henry makes friendly overtures to the French ambassador, hoping to prevent an invasion, and Francis Dereham, Catherine's former lover when they both resided with the Dowager Duchess of Norfolk, arrives at court and blackmails the queen into making him her private secretary. Some weeks later Henry receives a secret letter about their prior sexual exploits.

In episode 5, the King grants permission to the Earl of Hertford to investigate the queen's alleged liaison with Dereham. He plans to pardon her but is then informed by his Council of her affair with Culpepper — revealed by Dereham under torture — and he has all three executed, along with Lady Rochford, who has gone mad in the Tower. On the scaffold, Catherine states that, although Queen of England, she would have preferred to have been Thomas Culpepper's wife. In episode 6, Henry is courted by both Spain and Rome to form a military alliance against the French, who have allied with the Turks, and he is persuaded to form an alliance with the Holy Roman Emperor and invade France. Thomas Seymour introduces Catherine Parr at court, and she catches the king's eye, even though she is married. Henry pursues her and sends Seymour to the Low Countries to remove him as a love rival.

Military preparations are made, and English troops lay siege to Boulogne, bombarding it with cannon as an Italian engineer digs a tunnel to blow up the castle. Charles Brandon captures a French father and daughter and falls in love with the daughter, Brigitte. At home, Catherine Parr is acting as regent in Henry's absence and uses her power to further the Protestant cause but is checked by Bishop Gardiner and his Catholic faction, supported by Princess Mary. In episode 8, the castle of Boulogne is overcome and the keys to the city handed over to Henry by the French mayor. Henry returns to court in triumph, leaving the Earl of Surrey in charge of the new possession.

At home, Henry is disturbed by the struggle between the Catholic and Protestant factions, and Catherine alienates him through her support of the Protestant reformation. Bishop Gardiner continues his campaign against Protestants and gathers enough evidence to persuade the king to issue an arrest warrant against the queen for heresy. In the meantime, Henry Howard, now Lieutenant General Surrey, loses a disastrous battle at Boulogne, and whilst making an attempt to usurp power from the 'new men' like the Seymours and Richard Rich, he is arrested, tried for treason, and executed, despite the paucity of evidence against him.

In episode 10 an increasingly frail Henry is facing his own mortality. His mind is on the succession, and he appoints the Earl of Hertford to be Lord Protector until Prince Edward comes of age. Catherine, knowing the mortal danger she is in, orders her ladies-in-waiting to destroy all their heretical books and no longer to discuss religious matters; she also submits herself to her husband, and he pardons her. The dying Charles Brandon is reunited with Henry for one final and nostalgic meeting. As the king's own end approaches, the ghosts of Henry's first three wives confront him over their deaths and his treatment of their children. Henry orders his family to spend Christmas at Greenwich, bidding them his final farewell and instructing the princesses Mary and Elizabeth to care for their brother. The final scene has him approving the portrait painted for him by Hans Holbein, depicting him as a virile, youthful King.

== Cast ==
Role	Actor	Seasons
The King
Henry VIII	Jonathan Rhys Meyers	1–4
The Queens
Katherine of Aragon	Maria Doyle Kennedy	1–2, 4 (Dream sequence)
Anne Boleyn	Natalie Dormer	1–2, 4 (Dream sequence)
Jane Seymour	Anita Briem	2
Jane Seymour	Annabelle Wallis	3, 4 (Dream sequence)
Anne of Cleves	Joss Stone	3–4
Catherine Howard	Tamzin Merchant	3–4
Catherine Parr	Joely Richardson	4
The King's Children
Princess Mary, daughter by Catherine of Aragon
Princess Mary, daughter by Catherine of Aragon	Bláthnaid McKeown	1
Princess Mary, daughter by Catherine of Aragon	Sarah Bolger	2–4
Princess Elizabeth, daughter by Anne Boleyn	Kate Duggan	2
Princess Elizabeth, daughter by Anne Boleyn	Claire MacCauley	3
Princess Elizabeth, daughter by Anne Boleyn	Laoise Murray	4
Prince Edward, son by Jane Seymour	Eoin Murtagh	4
Prince Edward, son by Jane Seymour	Jake Hathaway	4
Henry FitzRoy, illegitimate son by Elizabeth Blount	Zak Jenciragic	1
The King's Court
Charles Brandon, 1st Duke of Suffolk	Henry Cavill	1–4
Thomas Cromwell, 1st Earl of Essex	James Frain	1–3
Sir Thomas More	Jeremy Northam	1–2
Thomas Wriothesley, 1st Earl of Southampton	Frank McCusker	3–4
Thomas Howard, 3rd Duke of Norfolk	Henry Czerny	1
Lady Elizabeth Blount	Ruta Gedmintas	1
Sir Anthony Knivert	Callum Blue	1
Sir William Compton	Kristen Holden-Ried	1
Thomas Tallis	Joe Van Moyland	1
Edward Stafford, 3rd Duke of Buckingham	Steven Waddington	1
Thomas Wyatt	Jamie Thomas King	1–2
Thomas Boleyn, 1st Earl of Wiltshire	Nick Dunning	1–2
Mary Boleyn	Perdita Weeks	1–2
George Boleyn, 2nd Viscount Rochford	Padraic Delaney	1–2
Jane Boleyn, Viscountess Rochford	Joanne King	2–4
Lady Margaret Sheldon	Laura Jane Laughlin	2
Mark Smeaton	David Alpay	2
William Brereton	James Gilbert	2
Edward Seymour, Earl of Hertford	Max Brown	2–4
Anne Seymour, Countess of Hertford	Emma Hamilton	3–4
Thomas Seymour	Andrew McNair	3–4
Sir Richard Rich	Rod Hallett	2–4
Sir Francis Bryan	Alan van Sprang	3
George Talbot, 4th Earl of Shrewsbury	Gavin O'Connor	3
Henry Howard, Earl of Surrey	David O'Hara	4
Joan Bulmer	Catherine Steadman	4
Sir Thomas Culpeper	Torrance Coombs	4
Francis Dereham	Allen Leech	4
Hans Holbein the Younger	Peter Gaynor	1, 3–4
Holy Roman Ambassador Eustace Chapuys	Anthony Brophy	1–4
French Ambassador Charles de Marillac	Lothaire Bluteau	4
Sir Henry Norris	Stephen Hogan	2
Clergy
Cardinal Thomas Wolsey, Archbishop of York	Sam Neill	1
Cardinal Campeggio	John Kavanagh	1–2
John Fisher, Bishop of Rochester	Bosco Hogan	1–2
Pope Clement VII	Ian McElhinney	1
Thomas Cranmer, Archbishop of Canterbury	Hans Matheson	2
Pope Paul III	Peter O'Toole	2
Cardinal Otto Truchsess von Waldburg	Max von Sydow	3
Cardinal Reginald Pole	Mark Hildreth	3
Bishop Stephen Gardiner	Simon Ward	3–4
Other
Margaret Tudor, (Note: The character of Henry's sister, called "Princess Margaret" in the series, is actually a composite of his two sisters: the life events of his younger sister, Princess Mary Tudor, coupled with the name of his elder sister, Margaret Tudor. This was reportedly done to avoid confusion with Henry's daughter, Queen Mary I.)	Gabrielle Anwar	1
Francis I of France	Emmanuel Leconte	1–2
Charles V, Holy Roman Emperor	Sebastian Armesto	1
Catherine Brandon, Duchess of Suffolk	Rebekah Wainwright	1–4
Margaret Pole, Countess of Salisbury	Kate O'Toole	1, 3
Margaret, Lady Bryan	Jane Brennan	2–4
Philip, Duke of Bavaria	Colin O'Donoghue	3
William, Duke of Jülich-Cleves-Berg, Brother to Anne of Cleves	Paul Ronan	3
Robert Aske	Gerard McSorley	3
Thomas Darcy, 1st Baron Darcy de Darcy	Colm Wilkinson	3–4

== Episodes ==
Series	Episodes	Originally released	
Series	Episodes	First released	Last released
1	10	1 April 2007	10 June 2007
2	10	30 March 2008	1 June 2008
3	8	5 April 2009	24 May 2009
4	10	11 April 2010	20 June 2010

== Reception ==
Metacritic ratings per season
View chart definition.

Season	1	2	3	4
Rating	64	68	74	63

The premiere of The Tudors on 1 April 2007 was the highest-rated Showtime series debut in three years. On 23 March 2008, The New York Times called The Tudors a "primitively sensual period drama ... [that] critics could take or leave, but many viewers are eating up". A 28 March 2008 review, also by the New York Times, reported that "despite the scorching authenticity of some performances", in particular the "star-making, breakout performance of Natalie Dormer as the defiant, courageous proto-feminist martyr Anne Boleyn" it "fails to live up to the great long-form dramas cable television has produced", largely because "it radically reduces the era's thematic conflicts to simplistic struggles over personal and erotic power". According to the ratings site Metacritic, the show had 64% favourable reviews for the first season, 68% for the second season, 74% for the third season, and 63% for the fourth.

== Ratings ==
In the United States, the first-season premiere drew almost 870,000 viewers. The premiere earned a combined one million views online and via cable affiliates.

== Media releases ==
DVD Name	Release dates				# of Ep	Additional Information
DVD Name	Region 1		Region 2	Region 4	# of Ep	Additional Information
DVD Name	Canada	United States	Region 2	Region 4	# of Ep	Additional Information
Season One	8 January 2008		10 December 2007	19 March 2008	10	The four-disc box set includes all ten episodes. There is a special edition in United Kingdom, with a headless picture for the cover, exclusive of Amazon.co.uk. This season was released on Blu-ray in Europe and Canada.
Season Two	11 November 2008	6 January 2009	13 October 2008	7 July 2009	10	The three-disc box set includes all ten episodes. This season has also been released on Blu-ray in Europe and Canada.
Season Three	10 November 2009	15 December 2009	7 December 2009	23 November 2009	8	The three disc box set includes all eight episodes. Bonus features include an exclusive tour of Hampton Court and an interview with Joss Stone.
Season Four	9 November 2010	12 October 2010	21 March 2011	24 November 2010	10	The three-disc box set includes all ten episodes.

An original soundtrack for each season, composed by Trevor Morris, has been released by Varèse Sarabande.

Season	Release date	Catalog number
Season One	12 November 2007	302 066 867 2
Season Two	14 April 2009	302 066 959 2
Season Three	24 August 2010	302 067 039 2
Season Four	10 December 2010	302 067 049 2

== Awards and nominations ==
The Tudors was nominated for the Golden Globe for Best Drama Series in 2007. Jonathan Rhys Meyers received two nominations for the Best Actor in a Television Drama Golden Globe, in 2007 and 2008.

The series was nominated for eight Irish Film and Television Awards in 2008 and won seven, including Best Drama Series, acting awards for Jonathan Rhys Meyers (Lead Actor), Nick Dunning (Supporting Actor) and Maria Doyle Kennedy (Supporting Actress), and craft awards for Costume Design, Production Design and Hair/Makeup. Brian Kirk was also nominated for Directing, but lost to Lenny Abrahamson of Prosperity. The series won the 2007 59th Primetime Creative Arts Emmy Awards for Outstanding Costumes for a Series and Outstanding Main Title Theme Music. Later the series won six awards at the Irish Film and Television Awards in 2009, including Drama Series, Director, Actor in a Supporting Role, Actress in a Supporting Role, Costume Design and Make Up & Hair. In 2010, it was nominated for seven Irish Film and Television Awards, winning one in the category Best Supporting Actress in Television (Sarah Bolger). In 2011, it was nominated for six Irish Film and Television Awards, winning three; Drama Series, Costume Design and Make Up & Hair.

== See also ==
- List of The Tudors characters
- List of The Tudors episodes

== Print sources ==
- Burr, Oliver (1996). The Secret Life of Henry VIII. Scotland: Edinburgh University Press.
- Davies, Norman (2001). The Isles: A History. USA: Oxford University Press.
- Ives, Eric (2005). The Life and Death of Anne Boleyn. Wiley-Blackwell.
- Parrill, Sue; Robison, William B (2013). The Tudors on Film and Television. McFarland. ISBN 978-0786458912.
