= That Face =

2007 two-act play written by Polly Stenham

- That Face original West End production poster
- Original language: English
- Written by: Polly Stenham
- Genre: Comedy Drama, Realism

Premiere
- Date: 26 April 2007
- Place: England

That Face is a two-act play written by Polly Stenham. It was premiered at the Royal Court Theatre in London on 26 April 2007, directed by Jeremy Herrin. The play was revived at the Duke of York's Theatre in the West End in 2008, opening on 1 May. It received its American premiere in May 2010, at the Manhattan Theatre Club, running through until 27 June.

== Plot ==
Mia is at boarding school and has access to her mother's drugs. She gets into trouble for drugging a fellow student and this causes her father to be brought back to England from Hong Kong. Henry, her brother, has dropped out of school and has to stay at home and look after his alcoholic mother. Martha, their fading glamorous mother, controls their lives whilst her own sick mind and world crumble around her.

== Productions ==
=== Original West End production ===
When That Face was premiered in the West End, the cast was as follows: Lindsay Duncan, Hannah Murray, Matt Smith, Catherine Steadman and Julian Wadham. Prior to the West End transfer, Felicity Jones played the Hannah Murray role.

=== 2010 New York production ===
The Manhattan Theatre Club mounted the play on its Stage I in May 2010, with Cristin Milioti and Christopher Abbott portraying the siblings, and Laila Robins as the mother.

=== Landor Theatre ===
That Face received its first London revival at The Landor Theatre from 12 November to 1 December 2013, starring Caroline Wildi as Martha, Rory Fleck-Byrne as Henry, Stephanie Hyam as Mia and Georgina Leonidas as Izzy.

=== 2023 London Revival ===
The Orange Tree Theatre production, directed by Josh Seymour, opened in September 2023 starring Niamh Cusack as Martha, Kasper Hilton-Hille as Henry, Ruby Stokes as Mia and Sarita Gabony as Izzy. The production received 5-star reviews in the Guardian and The Stage. Hilton-Hille won Best Newcomer at The Offies and was nominated for Best Performer in a Play at The Stage Debut Awards 2024.

== Critical reaction ==
That Face was received positively by critics, who particularly praised the new writer and the performances from the actors. Charles Spencer of The Daily Telegraph said it was "a blazing, no-holds barred production… Fresh, passionate and blackly comic – exhilarating... Lindsay Duncan’s superb performance...Matt Smith is outstanding." The Daily Express mentioned that "Polly Stenham is a modern successor to Tennessee Williams or Edward Albee... Intensely moving, skillfully crafted piece." The Daily Express, The Evening Standard, The Guardian, The Times, Time Out, Metro, Radio 4 and The Sunday Times also reviewed it very positively. In late 2009, the play was named at no. 9 in The Times Top Twenty Plays of the Decade. It also received three Olivier Award nominations (one in 2008, before the transfer, then nods for Best New Play and Best Actress in a Play in 2009).
