= Catherine Steadman =

British actress (born 1983)

- Born: 8 February 1983 (age 43); England
- Education: Oxford School of Drama
- Occupations: Actress; author
- Years active: 2006–present
- Spouse: Ross Armstrong

Catherine Steadman (born 8 February 1983) is a British actress and author.

== Career ==
Steadman trained at the Oxford School of Drama and made her screen debut playing Julia Bertram in Mansfield Park. Since then she has appeared in television series such as The Tudors, The Inbetweeners, Fresh Meat, Midsomer Murders and Trying Again. Some of her more notable roles include Nurse Wilson in ITV's Breathless, Mabel Lane Fox in Downton Abbey, Maggie Lewis in Tutankhamun, Gemma in BBC Four's Bucket, Mrs Forbes in Victoria and Eliza Gestalt in The Rook.

On stage, she has appeared in the West End in Polly Stenham's award-winning That Face, the Royal Shakespeare Company's Oppenheimer (for which she was nominated for a Laurence Olivier Award for Best Supporting Actress) and the title role in the West End revival of Witness for the Prosecution.

Steadman's debut novel, the psychological thriller Something in the Water, was published in June 2018 by Simon & Schuster UK and Penguin Random House USA. Her second novel, Mr Nobody, was published in January 2020 and her third, The Disappearing Act, in June 2021. A fourth novel, The Family Game was published in October 2022.

== Filmography ==
=== Film ===
Year	Title	Role	Notes
2007	Mansfield Park	Julia Bertram	Television film
2007	The Admirer	Anna	Short film
2008	The Portrait	Mira	Short film
2009	Dust	Elodie	
2009	Princess Kaiulani	Miss Barnes	
2010	The Story of F***	Thornton Quinn	
2010	An Old Fashioned Christmas	Tilly	Television film
2010	Dark Room	Keira Donaghy	Short film
2011	Salmon Fishing in the Yemen	Ashley	
2012	Outpost: Black Sun	Lena	
2012	Lost Buoys	Daughter	Short film
2012	Once and for All	Young Woman	Short film
2012	Plastic Gangsters	Miranda	Television film
2013	About Time	Tina	
2013	The Pig Child	Rosa	Short film
2018	Astral	Claire Harmann	
2019	The Appointment	Anne	Short film

=== Television ===
Year	Title	Role	Notes
2006	The Bill	Jessica Bentham	Episode: "Hold Feet to the Fire"
2007	Doctors	Chloe Hobbs	Episode: "Off the Edge"
2008	Holby City	Anna Richards	Recurring role; 3 episodes
2009	Doctors	Laura McQuigan	Recurring role; 3 episodes
2009	The Inbetweeners	Daisy	Episode: "The Duke of Edinburgh Awards"
2010	Missing	Helen Harper	Episode: "One for Sorrow"
2010	The Tudors	Joan Bulmer	Recurring role; 5 episodes
2010	Law & Order: UK	Joanne Ellis	Episode: "Defence"
2013	Lewis	Polly Beatty	Episode: "Down Among the Fearful"
2013	Breathless	Angela Wilson	Miniseries; 6 episodes
2013	Fresh Meat	Alison	Recurring role; 3 episodes
2014	Quirke	Claire Stafford	Episode: "Christine Falls"
2014	Trying Again	Kate	Recurring role; 5 episodes
2014	Masterpiece Mystery!		Episode: "Breathless, Part 1"
2014	Downton Abbey	Mabel Lane Fox	Recurring role; 5 episodes
2016	Tutankhamun	Maggie Lewis	Miniseries; 2 episodes
2016	Midsomer Murders	Corina Craven	Episode: "The Village That Rose from the Dead"
2017	Bucket	Gemma	Miniseries; 2 episodes
2017	Fearless	Karen Buxton	Miniseries; 4 episodes
2017	Victoria	Mrs. Forbes	Episode: "Comfort and Joy"
2019	The Rook	Eliza Gestalt	Miniseries; 8 episodes
2020	On the Edge	Alex	Episode: "For You"
2026	The Rapture	Nina Pearce	

== Works ==
- Steadman, Catherine (2018). Something in the Water: A Novel. New York: Ballantine Books. ISBN 9781524797188.
- Steadman, Catherine (2020). Mr Nobody. London: Simon & Schuster. ISBN 9781471167225.
- Steadman, Catherine (2021). The Disappearing Act: A Novel (1st hardcover ed.). London: Ballantine Books. ISBN 9780593158036.
- Steadman, Catherine (2022). The Family Game: A Novel. New York: Ballantine Books. ISBN 9780593158067.
