= List of The Tudors characters =

The following is a list of characters from the Showtime television series The Tudors (2007–2010).

== Characters ==
The main cast are listed in credits order.

Character name	Portrayed by	Historical basis	First appearance	Last appearance
King Henry VIII	Jonathan Rhys Meyers (2007–2010)	Henry VIII of England	Episode 1.01	Episode 4.10
As the virile young king of England, King Henry VIII seems to have it all. However, he is troubled by religious unrest and political struggles in his own realm, as well as changing allegiances with other countries. Weighing most on his mind is his failure to secure the throne's stability by producing a male heir with his wife Katherine of Aragon, a pious and dutiful Queen who is popular with the people. He does, however, dote on their daughter Mary, whom he hopes to marry off to the son of another European ruler. The series portrays Henry as having a major turning point in his marriage to Katherine after a near-death experience in the early 1520s, after which he becomes obsessed with trying to produce a male heir. The difficult pursuit of an annulment approved by the Pope begins when Henry meets and falls in love with Anne Boleyn, a charming lady-in-waiting to the Queen. Determined that Anne should become his new Queen and provide him with a legitimate son, Henry separates himself from his wife and the Catholic Church. When he fails in his attempts to have a son with Anne and instead has another daughter, Elizabeth, he is quick to lay the blame at Anne's door. He meets Jane Seymour, shy daughter of a knight. Convinced that his future lies with Jane, he takes the chance to be rid of Anne when his friend Charles Brandon tells him of rumors suggesting that she has been unfaithful. Anne is quickly brought to trial, found guilty and executed. Although Henry's personal life improves with his marriage to Jane Seymour, who helps reunite him with his daughters, his position is threatened when Catholics in the north start to rebel against him. He crushes the rebellion and brutally punishes those involved. Finally his wish comes true when Jane gives birth to a son, Edward, but she falls sick and dies from childbed fever a few days later, leaving him in a deep state of depression. He remains a widower for three years until Thomas Cromwell persuades him into a fourth marriage with the German princess Anne of Cleves. Henry is disgusted by her when he finally meets her. Unable to escape the betrothal, he marries her but starts annulment proceedings soon after. Henry notices the beautiful Catherine Howard and decides to marry her because she makes him feel young again. She is executed once her hidden past relations with Francis Dereham and her adulterous affair with Thomas Culpeper came to light. Henry later marries his sixth and final wife, Catherine Parr, a wealthy widow closer to his age. She is a loving stepmother to all three of Henry's children and is made Queen Regent during Henry's absence in France. Bishop Gardiner and others suspect her of heresy and nearly have her arrested for it, but she is able to convince Henry of her devotion to him. Henry's health declines until his death in January 1547.
Cardinal Wolsey	Sam Neill (2007)	Thomas Wolsey	Episode 1.01	Episode 1.10
King Henry VIII's primary and most trusted adviser in the first part of his reign, with leanings towards France. Wolsey's personal power and influence over the King has aroused the ire of several noble families, and even of Queen Katherine of Aragon herself. Despite being a cardinal of the Catholic Church, he has a long-time mistress whom he treats as his wife. Wolsey desperately tries to find a way for Henry to free himself of his marriage to Katherine, but fails and his enemies pounce. Wolsey is subsequently charged with financial corruption, arrested for treason and commits suicide by slashing his neck during prayer (historically he died of natural causes whilst en route from York to London to face trial).
Sir Anthony Knivet	Callum Blue (2007)	Thomas Knyvett	Episode 1.01	Episode 1.10
Longtime friend to King Henry VIII; he only appears in the first season.
Charles Brandon, 1st Duke of Suffolk	Henry Cavill (2007–2010)	Charles Brandon, 1st Duke of Suffolk	Episode 1.01	Episode 4.10
King Henry VIII's best friend. Brandon briefly falls out of favour when he secretly married Henry's widowed sister, Princess Margaret, after her brief term as Queen of Portugal. Brandon's infidelity makes the marriage an unhappy one. He becomes an ally of the Duke of Norfolk and Sir Thomas Boleyn, to bring about the downfall of Cardinal Wolsey and to ensure his own return to court. After the removal of Cardinal Wolsey as Lord Chancellor, Brandon is appointed to the presidency of the Privy Council by Henry. After his promotion he shows little interest in the work of government leaving this responsibility to the Duke of Norfolk with whom he jointly shares the duties as president. Brandon is seen as a playboy in the show's first season, but he becomes a mature courtier and magnate after marrying his ward Catherine Willoughby in the second season. He now hates the Boleyn family. In the third season, he is a reluctant but efficient leader of the King's forces, sent to repress a Catholic uprising. He is jealous of Thomas Cromwell, working to ensure his fall from office. In the third and fourth seasons, Brandon senses the increasing disdain that his second wife feels for his flawed character. In the final season, they are separated and he falls in love with Brigitte Rousselot, a young French woman he captured during the siege of Boulogne and takes her back to England. He eventually dies in the season finale.
Duke of Norfolk	Henry Czerny (2007)	Thomas Howard, 3rd Duke of Norfolk	Episode 1.01	Episode 1.10
Uncle of Anne Boleyn and Henry VIII's fifth wife, Catherine Howard. Norfolk is represented as an arrogant intriguer, conscious of his noble rank and arch-enemy of Cardinal Wolsey. He and his brother-in-law Thomas Boleyn conspire to manoeuvre Norfolk's niece, Anne Boleyn, into Henry's bed in order to gain influence over him and to advance their own interests. Together with Charles Brandon, Duke of Suffolk, they engineer Wolsey's overthrow and then his arrest (and indirectly, his subsequent death). Norfolk is subsequently jointly appointed with Suffolk to the presidency of the Privy Council. Norfolk does not appear in seasons 2, 3 or 4, although, in actuality, he was still alive and played a significant role in the events shown in those seasons; Catherine Howard was a closer relation to him than portrayed in season 3.
Anne Boleyn	Natalie Dormer (2007–2008)	Anne Boleyn	Episode 1.01	Episode 2.10 (4.10 Dream Sequence)
Daughter of Sir Thomas Boleyn, and sister of George and Mary Boleyn. Anne was sent to be a lady-in-waiting to Queen Katherine of Aragon. She attracted King Henry VIII's attention at the masquerade where she, along with his sister Margaret, played one of the Graces. By her father's orders, Anne continually pust herself in Henry's way, until he is so enamoured of her that he vows he would take her as his only mistress if she would give herself to him. Anne, remembering how her sister Mary was thrown aside after Henry tired of her, refuses him, saying that she was saving her virginity for her eventual husband, causing Henry, already at odds with Katherine for failing to produce a living son, to consider annulment or divorce. Anne admits to her father that while she did not like the role of sacrificial lamb at first, she is growing to love Henry. At first their relationship is a secret, but more and more Henry treats her, rather than Katherine, as his consort. The delay of the annulment proceedings frustrates Henry, and Anne used this opportunity to blame Wolsey for the delay, leaving Henry when she feels that the proceedings will never come to fruition. She also gradually turn Henry against the Catholic church so that, becoming head of the church in his own realm, he can finally divorce Katherine without referring to Rome. The second season sees Anne reach the peak and end of her power. She is created as Marquess of Pembroke in her own right, and is taken to France to meet King Francis I as the future Queen of England. She sleeps with Henry and conceives a child, whom she is confident will be a boy. Soon afterward, Henry marries Anne and crowns her as Queen, his marriage to Katherine annulled by Archbishop Thomas Cranmer. However, Anne and Henry's hopes are dashed when she gives birth to a daughter, Elizabeth. Anne is ordered by her father to do everything to win back Henry's love, as his lack of attention becomes evident after her miscarriage of her second child and his growing interest in her lady-in-waiting Jane Seymour. Anne encourages Henry to disinherit his elder daughter Mary but tries to establish ties with her on the condition that Mary accept her as queen, but Mary rebuffs this offer. Anne conceives again but experiences another miscarriage, which convinces Henry that his relationship with Anne will never result in male children. Encouraged by Henry and his desire to end his marriage, Anne is eventually accused of witchcraft, incest and adultery. Henry removes Elizabeth from the line of succession, convinced she is not his daughter, and sentences Anne to execution by beheading, which she goes to with dignity, gaining admiration from the people. Anne re-appears in the final episode of Season 4 in the dream sequence alongside Elizabeth, expressing pride for her clever daughter, proclaiming her innocence that the crimes she was killed for, and showing sympathy for her deceased cousin Catherine Howard.
Katherine of Aragon	Maria Doyle Kennedy (2007–2008)	Katherine of Aragon	Episode 1.01	Episode 2.07 (4.10 Dream Sequence)
The youngest child of King Ferdinand II and Queen Isabella I of Spain, as well as the first wife and queen consort of Henry VIII of England. She was once married to Henry's older brother, Prince Arthur, but claims that that marriage was never consummated. Most of her children were either miscarried or died in infancy; her one surviving child is her daughter Mary. Katherine is very lonely at court, her only friend being Ambassador Mendoza, as Cardinal Wolsey dismissed her Spanish ladies-in-waiting for fear that they were spies for her nephew, the Holy Roman Emperor, and bribed most of her English ladies-in-waiting, who are also sometimes seduced by Henry. Nevertheless, she always does her duties as Queen admirably, donating to and even mingling with the common people after church services, and she is loved by the English people despite her background. Because of Katherine's seeming inability to have living sons, along with the onset of the menopause, Henry worries that England might face a reversion to civil war in the event of his death. With the Wars of the Roses still a recent memory, he is determined to have a legitimate son to inherit the throne. He therefore prefers to believe that Katherine lied when she swore that her previous marriage was never consummated and that therefore his marriage to her is incestuous and invalid. She is banished to spend her final days at the manor "The More", without any contact from her daughter Mary. However, Henry is shown to genuinely care for Katherine, as shown when he tearfully informs her of his intent to divorce her. She is last seen dictating her will on her deathbed, intercut with it read aloud by a mournful Henry; Anne Boleyn smiles upon hearing the news and states that "Now, I am indeed queen." Katherine re-appears in the final episode of Season 4 in the dream sequence alongside Mary, confronting Henry about his mistreatment towards their daughter and her own status as his 'true wife'.
Thomas Boleyn	Nick Dunning (2007–2008)	Thomas Boleyn, 1st Earl of Wiltshire	Episode 1.01	Episode 2.10
Father of George, Mary, and Anne Boleyn, and brother-in-law to the Duke of Norfolk. Thomas Boleyn appears initially as the English ambassador to France, who sees his daughters primarily as a means to advance family interests. To this end, he encourages Mary to become Henry's mistress and when Mary is discarded, encourages Anne in the same way; she however wants the higher status of a royal marriage. Together with Norfolk and Suffolk, Boleyn engineers Cardinal Wolsey's downfall. He becomes a leading member of the Privy Council, although somewhat subordinate to his two fellow plotters. In the second season, Boleyn starts to worry that Anne is losing the king's love and urges her to keep him at her side, even telling her to 'offer him a gift', one of her ladies-in-waiting, as a mistress. He is later faced with Anne's fear of the Seymour family but this only catches his attention when his ally, Thomas Cromwell, offers his quarters to them at the King's request. Following Cromwell's investigation of rumours of treason committed by Anne, Boleyn is arrested along with others, but is reprieved by the King and exiled from court. He is berated by Charles Brandon in the last episode of Season 2 for his selfishness and his evident relief that he will live while his son and daughter will die. In the season 4 episode "A Moment of Nostalgia" Brandon mentions that Boleyn has died recently with only the ghosts of his children in attendance at the funeral.
Thomas More	Jeremy Northam (2007–2008)	Thomas More	Episode 1.01	Episode 2.05
A longtime friend of Henry VIII, a pious Christian lawyer and a family man. More abhors war and tried to advise Henry against it, but nevertheless believes that stern action is required to combat the rise of Lutheranism. During More's brief time as Lord Chancellor after Cardinal Wolsey, More has six people found guilty of heresy burned at the stake, although he offers them the chance to recant. After it becomes apparent that Henry is also changing his attitude towards Catholicism, More becomes worried, finally recalling that Wolsey once told him that he should have told the king what he ought to do, not what he can do, for "if the lion knows his own strength, no man could control him". In the second season, More avoids taking any public position over the "King's great matter" of divorce from Katherine of Aragon, but is condemned and executed after refusing to take an oath recognising Henry as supreme head of the English Church. More is condemned to be hanged, drawn and quartered but Henry, out of respect, commutes this to beheading. Henry shows deep regret over More's death.
Thomas Cromwell	James Frain (2007–2009)	Thomas Cromwell, 1st Earl of Essex	Episode 1.04	Episode 3.08
A common-born family man elevated by Cardinal Wolsey after Henry VIII's secretary is removed (see Richard Pace, below). Cromwell is secretly the ally of the Boleyn family and introduces Anne to Lutheranism, which she subsequently introduced Henry to. Although Cromwell is untrustworthy to anyone but the King and is no-one's true friend, he always gives potential opponents a fair warning; while guarded about his own opinions, he is not hesitant to show genuine admiration when he feels it. In this, he is very like Sir Thomas More, although Cromwell is a Protestant reformer and More was a devout Catholic, but he is much more unscrupulous with his actions. In the second season, Cromwell rises to the position of Lord Chancellor after the fall of More (in actuality he was never Lord Chancellor although the chief minister). Cromwell is depicted as being ruthless and calculating, but also as a hard-working and extremely capable minister; he is Wolsey's successor as the King's right-hand man. His role as a talented administrator and reformer eventually comes into conflict with Henry's ambiguous commitment to the Reformation. Cromwell orders swift and necessary action when allegations arise regarding Queen Anne Boleyn (which leads to her ultimate downfall) at Henry's orders, but sees the Reformation slipping away, with the Church of England, despite its break from Rome, retaining Catholic tradition and ritual. An attempt to strengthen the King's ties to Protestantism through a marriage to Anne of Cleves (though couched as a political alliance) backfires. Because of his common origins, he is resented by nobles and frequently abused even by Henry. Cromwell's beheading is a botched affair because the executioner is drunk.
Thomas Wyatt	Jamie King (2007–2008)	Thomas Wyatt	Episode 1.03	Episode 2.10
The former love of Anne Boleyn, poet Thomas Wyatt befriends and collaborates with composer Thomas Tallis while both are on a trip to France with Cardinal Wolsey. He claims to have had carnal relations with Anne, although this is at odds with Anne saying that her maidenhead was only for her husband to claim. He makes few appearances in the first season, but appears frequently in the second. He still holds and proclaims his feelings for Anne even though she has married the King. Wyatt is arrested and charged with betraying Henry, but is released in time to see Anne's execution. He notes the irony that of the accused lovers, he is the only one who is actually guilty and the only one who survives.
Thomas Cranmer	Hans Matheson (2008)	Thomas Cranmer	Episode 2.01	Episode 2.10
The Archbishop of Canterbury who resolves the dispute over Henry's marriage of Katherine of Aragon by declaring it "null and void" and recognising Anne Boleyn as the new Queen. He is presented as a nervous (and secretly married) man when Thomas Cromwell introduces him to the king. When he becomes the new archbishop, he gains more confidence and takes decisions to move against Katherine and reform the Church in England. He is portrayed from then on as cold and harsh but devoted. A determined Protestant reformer, he resents traditionalist men like Thomas More and Bishop Fisher and, despite their years of loyal service to the king, he brands them as traitors. He is deeply loyal to Anne Boleyn but, despite his devotion to her, he is forced to relinquish their mutual desire for a reformed faith when Anne falls from favour. He takes her last confession in the Tower and breaks the news to her that Elizabeth is to be declared illegitimate, but promises her that he will endeavour to keep her in the King's "good and kind graces". Historically Cranmer lived until Henry's daughter Mary inherited the throne, when she, a Catholic, had him burnt at the stake for his Protestant beliefs.
Pope Paul III	Peter O'Toole (2008)	Pope Paul III	Episode 2.01	Episode 2.07
The Pope of the Roman Catholic Church who declares Henry's marriage to Anne Boleyn invalid and excommunicates Henry. Portrayed as a skilled politician with a dry sense of humour, Pope Paul sends a "Soldier in Christ" to assassinate the new Queen, with the promise that he will gain access into heaven no matter if it succeeds or fails. Paul is outraged by and denounces the executions of both Bishop Fisher and Thomas More. He has no qualms about using force when necessary but is also portrayed as a loving man who considers the Catholics his children and wants to protect them as a father would protect his child. This is shown, for example, when Paul signs a document prohibiting the enslavement of the peoples of the New World. He remarks - rather pompously- that he must act as the conscience of the kings of Europe.
Jane Seymour	Anita Briem (2008); Annabelle Wallis (2009)	Jane Seymour	Episode 2.07 (Briem); Episode 3.01 (Wallis)	Episode 2.10 (Briem); Episode 3.04 (Wallis) (4.10 Dream Sequence)
Becoming less interested in his new wife Anne with her failure to produce a male heir, Henry VIII has Jane Seymour made one of Anne's ladies-in-waiting in an attempt to seduce her. Jane, mindful of her reputation and following her brother's advice, refuses Henry's gifts and advances, impressing the king with her modesty. A romance develops between Henry and Jane as his marriage to Anne deteriorates further; when Anne catches Henry kissing Jane, she flies into a rage and miscarries a son. Henry orders Anne's arrest for adultery, moving Jane into her quarters and proposing marriage. Henry and Jane become engaged on the same day as Anne's execution and get married just 10 days later. As an increasingly popular Queen, Jane promotes Princess Mary's interests and secures her position back at court. She also appeals to Henry to restore the dissolved monasteries, but she is quickly rebuked by him for meddling in political affairs. Unlike the doomed Anne, she heeds his warning and pursues her agendas within the restrictions of her position. Jane reunites Henry with both his daughters over Christmas, to everybody's delight. Her position as Queen is cemented when she gives birth to Henry's son, Edward. However the birth is long and difficult and she dies twelve days afterward from childbed fever, leaving Henry devastated as he falls into a deep depression from his grief. Henry regards Jane as his true love because of her kind nature and the fact that she gave him a son. She is given a queen's burial and Henry promises that one day they will be with each other again when he is buried beside her. Jane re-appears in the final episode of season 4 in the dream sequence alongside Edward, furious that Edward has been treated badly and will die at a very young age, frightening Henry.
Sir Francis Bryan	Alan van Sprang (2009)	Francis Bryan	Episode 3.01	Episode 3.08
Bryan is a secret agent, reputed assassin, and an accomplished cryptographer. He is appointed to the King's privy chamber, with close access to the King. With a reputation also as a rake and a libertine, Bryan is known as "The Vicar of Hell", and is an accomplice in several of the king's extramarital affairs. Bryan is instantly attracted to the fictional character Lady Ursula Misseldon and quickly becomes her lover. He is sent by Henry to France and Italy to murder Cardinal Reginald Pole, but fails in this mission. Although initially ready to act as an agent for Thomas Cromwell in attempting to intimidate Princess Mary, Bryan turns against the disgraced minister and by getting his executioner drunk is able to ensure that Cromwell's death is a cruel one.
Robert Aske	Gerard McSorley (2009)	Robert Aske	Episode 3.01	Episode 3.04
Aske is a Yorkshire lawyer who opposes the dissolution of the monasteries and becomes the leader of the Pilgrimage of Grace - a rising in northern England. He is persuaded to disband his forces after receiving pledges of pardon and policy change from Henry, through the Duke of Suffolk. However, the momentum the rebellion achieved goes beyond Aske's control, and a further uprising occurs, sealing his fate and eventual execution.
Cardinal von Waldburg	Max von Sydow (2009)	Otto Truchsess von Waldburg	Episode 3.01	Episode 3.06
A mentor to Reginald Pole.
Anne of Cleves	Joss Stone (2009–2010)	Anne of Cleves	Episode 3.06	Episode 4.03
A German princess and Henry's fourth wife. The king marries Anne to make a Protestant political alliance, on the advice of Thomas Cromwell. However the king is not attracted to her, saying "I like her not!", and the marriage is annulled only months later. Having the benefit of Katherine of Aragon's, Anne Boleyn's, and Jane Seymour's experiences to study, or perhaps eager for an escape route, she accepts the king's decision, and is rewarded with a pension and lands. She is later referred to as "the King's Beloved Sister" and remained well liked by the King's daughters, who continued to visit her after the annulment. In a later episode she is seen becoming intimate with Henry.
Catherine Howard	Tamzin Merchant (2009–2010)	Catherine Howard	Episode 3.08	Episode 4.05
Henry's fifth wife, and cousin of Henry's second wife, Anne Boleyn, Catherine first comes to court to serve as lady-in-waiting to Anne of Cleves before catching the King's eye. During her time as Queen, Catherine is known for her beauty and youth and clashes with Princess Mary, her stepdaughter, over the lack of respect shown her. Disillusioned with her marriage, Catherine enters into an affair with Thomas Culpeper, a gentleman of the privy chamber. She is later found guilty of adultery and executed.
Ambassador Charles de Marillac	Lothaire Bluteau (2010)	Charles de Marillac	Episode 4.01	Episode 4.09
The French ambassador to England in the final years of Henry's reign.
Princess Mary Tudor	Blathnaid McKeown (2007); Sarah Bolger (2008–2010)	Mary I of England	Episode 1.01 (McKeown); Episode 2.03 (Bolger)	Episode 1.07 (McKeown); Episode 4.10 (Bolger)
Mary is the daughter and only surviving child of Henry VIII and Katherine of Aragon. Mary's early years are full of happiness, receiving love and adoration from both her parents, and she is at various times betrothed to the Dauphin of France, her cousin, Charles V of Spain, and Francis I's youngest son, the Duke of Orléans. Initially, Mary remains unaware of her parents' failing marriage, but gradually she became increasingly aware of the situation. This starts when her illegitimate half-brother Henry Fitzroy receives titles and his own household, and she too receives a household of her own, but far away in the Welsh Marches and under the care of her governess Lady Salisbury. Mary's place in the line of succession is lost when her parents' marriage is annulled, and so Mary is then referred to as "Lady Mary", with any contact with her mother forbidden. The King severs all ties with her when her half-sister Elizabeth is born, and Mary is expelled from court, her servants dismissed from her service, and she is forced to serve as a lady-in-waiting, while Elizabeth receives Mary's place in the succession. Mary is relieved not only when her future stepmother, Jane Seymour, makes efforts to befriend her and reveals her hopes to restore her to the succession. Mary is allowed back to court when she (very reluctantly) signs a document that formally declares her allegiance to her father and acknowledges as him being the Head of the Church; thereby denying the tenets of her own Catholic faith in the process, something she agonises over. Henry had threatened to put her to death if she had refused, but upon seeing Mary for the first time in years, immediately regrets all his actions and welcomes her back to court. Mary is initially furious over the Lutheran Anne of Cleves becoming the new queen, but warms to her considerably upon meeting Catherine Howard, her frivolous and immature successor. Following Catherine's execution, Mary renews her friendship with Catherine Parr, Lady Latimer (historically, Parr was Katherine of Aragon's goddaughter, though this was not mentioned in the series), and is initially pleased at her father's interest and subsequent marriage to her. Mary's attitude hardens upon realising that Parr is Protestant. This discovery, which coincides with the departure of her friend and father-figure Eustace Chapuys, the Imperial Ambassador, causes Mary to snap and reveal the true depths of her faith.
Edward Seymour	Max Brown (2008–2010)	Edward Seymour, Earl of Hertford	Episode 2.08	Episode 4.10
Brother of Jane Seymour, he is quickly elevated as Jane gains the King's favour. His behaviour suggests that he cares more about the family's status than Jane's happiness. He acts as jailer to Lady Salisbury and her family, taking each in turn to their execution. Towards the end of Henry's reign he is the most powerful of the King's advisers, as uncle to Prince Edward.
Thomas Culpepper	Torrance Coombs (2010)	Thomas Culpepper	Episode 4.01	Episode 4.05
A courtier of Henry VIII and a gentleman of the privy chamber, he is executed for adultery with Catherine Howard.
Earl of Surrey	David O'Hara (2010)	Henry Howard, Earl of Surrey	Episode 4.01	Episode 4.09
An eminent poet with a reputation for debauchery, the Earl grew up with Henry VIII's illegitimate son Henry FitzRoy, who was his brother-in-law. Henry Howard is portrayed as an aggressive man and fearless soldier. As the son of the Duke of Norfolk and the cousin of both Katherine Howard and Anne Boleyn, he considers the Seymour family to be his enemy. He also has an intense hatred for the members of court who come from lower-class families.
Catherine Parr	Joely Richardson (2010)	Catherine Parr	Episode 4.06	Episode 4.10
Catherine Parr is introduced as the wife of an ailing old man, in love with Thomas Seymour, when she catches the King's eye. After the death of her husband, Seymour is sent overseas and the King asks for her hand in marriage, leaving Catherine with no option other than to accept the proposal. Their marriage is a mainly happy one and Catherine even serves as regent for Henry during his Boulogne campaign. Catherine is a Protestant reformer and is later suspected of heresy by Bishop Gardiner. However, after an appeal to Henry's ego, she manages to escape the charges being brought against her. Catherine is shown to be close to all three of the King's children. After Henry's death, she marries Thomas Seymour. She later died of childbed fever.

== Recurring ==
Character name	Portrayed by	Historical basis	First appearance	Last appearance
Duke of Buckingham	Steven Waddington (2007)	Edward Stafford, 3rd Duke of Buckingham	Episode 1.01	Episode 1.02
A direct descendant of King Edward III, Buckingham is openly resentful of the "new men" such as Cardinal Wolsey who have risen by ability rather than birth. Described by Thomas More as stupid but powerful, Buckingham confides to the Duke of Norfolk that he aspires to the crown. After being reprimanded by Henry for attempting to humiliate Wolsey, Buckingham plans to assassinate the King. However, this plan is reported to Wolsey by Thomas Boleyn, whom Buckingham had tried to recruit. Buckingham is subsequently convicted of treason and beheaded. He leaves behind a daughter, who had a brief relationship with Charles Brandon (also one of the reasons he was at odds with Henry, because the latter refused to punish Brandon).
Anna Buckingham Hastings	Anna Brewster (2007)	Anne Hastings née Stafford, Countess of Huntingdon	Episode 1.01	Episode 1.07
The Duke of Buckingham's daughter is briefly the lover of Charles Brandon, and a catalyst for her father's attempted usurpation of the throne. She later becomes the common law wife of William Compton, and dies in the dreaded sweating sickness epidemic along with him.
William Compton	Kristen Holden-Ried (2007)	William Compton	Episode 1.01	Episode 1.07
A longtime friend to Henry VIII, "common-born" William Compton (along with similarly ranked Charles Brandon and Anthony Knivert) attracts the ire of the Duke of Buckingham, due to Henry's favouritism toward the trio. Compton is knighted as Sir William Compton, alongside Knivert, for no more apparent reason than having amused the King by substituting a small log for a lance while jousting. The new Sir William is portrayed throughout the series as a witty and elegant courtier who avoids the occasional blunders of his two friends Brandon and Knivert. Compton, though married, soon shows a romantic homosexual interest in the young composer Thomas Tallis. At first Tallis refuses Compton's advances, but does not pull away when Compton kisses him; later they are shown in bed together. Compton is the second to die (after Henry Fitzroy) from the devastating "sweating sickness".
Thomas Tallis	Joe Van Moyland (2007)	Thomas Tallis	Episode 1.01	Episode 1.10
Young composer Thomas Tallis comes to London with good references and secures a position with the Chapel Royal. He soon attracts the attention of Sir William Compton, a close friend of Henry VIII, and the two become lovers. After Compton's death, Tallis courts two sisters. After his first choice dies, he marries the second. In a rare supernatural element in the series the dead sister watches Tallis and his new wife in bed together. Though he does not appear in subsequent seasons, Tallis continued to prosper throughout the period, and received the favour of Elizabeth I.
Mary Boleyn	Perdita Weeks (2007–2008)	Mary Boleyn	Episode 1.01	Episode 2.05
Daughter of Thomas Boleyn and sister to George and Anne Boleyn. Also mistress to Henry VIII, and former mistress of King Francis I of France. Seen more as a recurring character in the show's second season, although she is banished from court after revealing her secret marriage to William Stafford, who was of a lower rank.
Lady Elizabeth Blount	Ruta Gedmintas (2007)	Elizabeth Blount	Episode 1.01	Episode 1.05
Married (historically she did not marry until after the birth of her son) mistress of Henry VIII, and mother of Henry Fitzroy, Henry's first (though illegitimate) son to survive more than a few weeks. Fitzroy dies at the young age of four, as both she and the King weep over the loss. (In reality, her son survived well into his teenage years.)
Richard Pace	Matt Ryan (2007)	Richard Pace	Episode 1.01	Episode 1.04
A widower who was the secretary of Henry VIII. He is framed by Cardinal Wolsey as spying for the French, and sentenced to imprisonment in the Tower of London. He loses his mental faculties before he is released.
King Francis of France	Emmanuel Leconte (2007–2008)	Francis I of France	Episode 1.02	Episode 2.08
Sometimes an adversary and sometimes an ally of Henry VIII. He is later ordered by Pope Paul III to wage war on England after Henry's excommunication.
Queen Claude of France	Gabriella Wright (2007)	Claude of France	Episode 1.02	Episode 1.08
Queen consort of Francis I of France. She rejects the Duke of Suffolk's advances because she believes that making love in revenge (on her husband, who flaunts his mistresses much like Henry VIII) kills the soul.
Princess Margaret Tudor	Gabrielle Anwar (2007)	Mary Tudor, Queen of France; Margaret Tudor, Queen of Scots	Episode 1.03	Episode 1.09
Engaged to the elderly King of Portugal, Margaret begs her brother, Henry VIII of England, to reconsider the match. He refuses, and she is further irritated that he has chosen his common-born friend Charles Brandon to accompany her to Portugal and present her to her future husband. Margaret pressures Henry to agree that, once her husband is dead, she may marry whomever she chooses; he seems to concede. Margaret is at first dismissive of court Brandon, but they have sex on the long sea voyage to Portugal. Margaret marries the decrepit Portuguese king, who lives only a few days until she smothers him in his sleep. Henry is angry to lose the political alliance, but even more furious when he discovers that Margaret and Brandon have married without his consent. With accusations of treason, they are exiled from court; the Duke of Norfolk soon promises to intervene on Brandon's behalf in exchange for Brandon's assistance in ruining Norfolk's political rival, Cardinal Wolsey. Margaret's relationship with Brandon eventually collapses; she argues that he only "loved her for an hour", as he continues to have affairs with other women. As Brandon returns to favour at court, Margaret displays an obvious dislike for Anne Boleyn and her allies. Margaret falls ill with pulmonary tuberculosis, and dies as Charles is engaging in sex with another woman. Henry is furious at Brandon for his lack of attention to his wife, and Brandon shows remorse as he buries Margaret. The character of Margaret is an inaccurate composite of the real sisters of Henry, Princess Mary (who married the King of France and later Charles Brandon) and Princess Margaret (who married James IV of Scotland).
Ambassador Mendoza	Declan Conlon (2007–2009)	Íñigo López de Mendoza y Zúñiga	Episode 1.03	Episode 3.02
The Spanish ambassador to England, Mendoza serves as a link between Queen Katherine and her nephew, Charles V, as her letters to the latter are being opened by Cardinal Wolsey. He is also the one friend Katherine has at court, since her Spanish ladies-in-waiting were dismissed by Wolsey, and her English ladies-in-waiting were bribed by the Cardinal or seduced by the King himself. He bears the brunt of Henry VIII's anger when Charles V breaks the treaty between England and Spain by setting free Francis I of France without consulting Henry, and also by marrying Isabella of Portugal when he is betrothed to Princess Mary. He is promoted by Charles and sent home to Spain, leaving the issue of Katherine and Henry's divorce to be handled by Eustace Chapuys (the Imperial Ambassador, who remained to represent all of Charles V's territories).
Eustace Chapuys	Anthony Brophy (2007–2010)	Eustace Chapuys	Episode 1.03	Episode 4.08
Holy Roman Emperor Charles V's ambassador to the court of Henry VIII, initially serving alongside Mendoza (the Spanish Ambassador), but later representing all of Charles V's territories. As the Emperor is the nephew to Katherine of Aragon, his ambassador acts as her ally and plots against Anne Boleyn but achieves little. Chapuys attempts to use the devoutly Catholic courtier William Brereton to assassinate Anne, but the conspiracy fails. Brereton is subsequently executed for (falsely) admitting that he had an affair with Queen Anne. While presented as a skilled and cunning diplomat and courtier, Chapuys appears genuinely devoted to Princess Mary, advising and reassuring her during the period she is out of favour with the King. Towards the end of the series, Chapuys, now elderly and suffering from gout, resigns his post and returns to Spain. Although furious with Chapuys and the Emperor for their recent treaty with France, Henry appears somewhat regretful that he is to leave and wishes him a happy retirement. Before he leaves, Chapuys gives Princess Mary a ring that had been given to him by the Emperor, which he in turn had received from Katherine of Aragon. Princess Mary vows to restore England to Catholicism no matter the cost; Chapuys is visibly shaken by Mary's fanaticism. Shortly after his return to Spain, Chapuys dies, news that devastates Mary. Chapuys has the distinction of being the only character to feature prominently in all four seasons without ever being a starring cast member. His origin and ultimate fate were changed for the series: historically, he was a Savoyard rather than a Spaniard as suggested in the series, and he retired to the Low Countries, where he set up a small college in 1548. He died in 1556, meaning that he lived into Mary's reign.
Emperor Charles	Sebastian Armesto (2007)	Charles V, Holy Roman Emperor	Episode 1.03	Episode 1.03
Alternately the ally and adversary of King Henry VIII, Charles begins the series as the King of Spain and is the nephew of Henry's first wife, Queen Katherine of Aragon. He swiftly becomes Holy Roman Emperor as well, making him the single most powerful man in Christendom, and thus the perfect ally for Henry to lay aside his alliance with France for. He is betrothed to Princess Mary, although he later broke the betrothal in order to marry Isabella of Portugal. Charles only appears in a single episode of the first season, but is mentioned in almost every episode of the series thereafter, usually referred to simply as "the Emperor." He is initially represented in England by Ambassadors Mendoza (of Spain) and Chapuys (of the Holy Roman Empire), although he eventually recalls Mendoza and authorizes Chapuys to represent him alone.
George Boleyn	Pádraic Delaney (2007–2008)	George Boleyn, Viscount Rochford	Episode 1.04	Episode 2.09
Son of Thomas Boleyn and brother to Mary and Anne Boleyn. George benefits greatly from Anne's rise, and revels in his newfound power. Despite his womanising, George has a clandestine affair with the male court musician Mark Smeaton. Upon his sister Anne's fall, George is accused of incest with Anne, which is later corroborated by his abused and neglected wife, Jane. He is beheaded for treason.
Lady Salisbury	Kate O'Toole (2007–2009)	Margaret Pole, Countess of Salisbury	Episode 1.05	Episode 3.06
A middle-aged noblewoman who is charged to act as governess and guardian to Princess Mary, daughter of Henry VIII and Katherine of Aragon, when the Princess is awarded her own household. Lady Salisbury later earns the King's enmity as the mother of Reginald Pole, who declines his offer of an appointment to a senior position in the Church of England but reluctantly accepts the rank of cardinal from the Pope. With Cardinal Pole beyond his reach despite assassination attempts, Henry takes vengeance against his family by having Lady Salisbury, another of her sons and her young grandson executed. The Pole family had a claim to the throne of England, which also caused the Tudors to be suspicious of them.
Bishop John Fisher	Bosco Hogan (2007–2008)	Bishop John Fisher	Episode 1.05	Episode 2.05
Bishop of Rochester and adviser to Katherine of Aragon. Historically, he was confessor and good friend to Henry's mother, and one of the few men who was not afraid of the King. He is made a Cardinal by the Pope for his steadfastness. He refuses to acknowledge Henry as head of the Church of England, and is executed. He was later canonised by the Catholic Church.
Catherine Willoughby Brandon, Duchess of Suffolk	Rebekah Wainwright (2007–2009); Marcella Plunkett (2010)	Catherine Willoughby, 12th Baroness Willoughby de Eresby	Episode 1.10 (Wainwright); Episode 4.10 (Plunkett)	Episode 3.08 (Wainwright); Episode 4.10 (Plunkett)
Charles Brandon's seventeen-year-old ward, Catherine becomes his second wife and Duchess of Suffolk. With her sharp-tongued wit, she motivates Brandon to "keep his pretty head" despite his hatred for Anne Boleyn, now Queen. When Catherine learns that Brandon has had a brief affair with a visiting French envoy's sister she forgives him, saying that he was the only one who made her cry. In Season 3 their marriage suffers from her contempt for Brandon's willingness to enforce the King's orders in ruthlessly putting down Catholic unrest in northern England. In season 4, she is not present and is estranged from her husband. She is not referred to in the series as ‘Catherine Willoughby’ (which would have been historically accurate, as she was the daughter of Lord Willoughby and Katherine of Aragon's lady in waiting Maria de Salinas); Brandon says her name is ‘Catherine Brook’. In the final episode of the series Catherine and Brandon's young French mistress confront each other at his funeral.
William Brereton	James Gilbert (2008)	William Brereton	Episode 2.01	Episode 2.09
Seeming to be commissioned by Pope Paul III and Ambassador Chapuys to assassinate Anne Boleyn for the good of King Henry VIII and the Catholic Church. He wis accused of having carnal knowledge of Queen Anne. Unlike the others in his position, who either denied (George Boleyn and Henry Norris) or were tortured into admitting it (Mark Smeaton), Brereton falsely admitted his guilt to Thomas Cromwell. He is beheaded along with the others accused.
Lady Jane Rochford	Joanne King (2008–2010)	Jane Boleyn, Viscountess Rochford	Episode 2.07	Episode 4.05
Wife of George Boleyn and thus sister-in-law of Queen Anne. She is sexually abused by George, who shows no affection for her at all. She tries to win his love but is frustrated by his affairs and disgusted when she learns of his relationship with Mark Smeaton. She avoids sharing in the fall of the Boleyns by giving evidence against her husband and agreeing to the allegation that he committed incest with Anne. Despite her unhappy marriage and the scandal of her in-laws, Jane is asked back to court by Queen Jane and is appointed as her principal lady-in-waiting. Jane secretly helps the Queen to get funds to the Lady Elizabeth's governess when Henry refuses to pay, and arranges the public return of Lady Mary to court. Lady Rochford is a keen supporter of the Reformation and abhors the Catholic faith, although she is so moved by Jane's actions that she puts aside her opinions. She is later seen as a lady-in-waiting to Queen Catherine Howard, whom she despises, but facilitates the Queen's clandestine affair with Thomas Culpepper, who is obsessed with Catherine. Once the affair comes to light, she is interrogated and arrested for treason and has a nervous breakdown. Despite Lady Rochford being declared legally insane, King Henry VIII has a law enacted to make it legal to execute her by beheading. She is executed on the same day as Queen Catherine.
Princess Elizabeth Tudor	Kate Duggan (2008); Claire MacCauley (2009); Laoise Murray (2010)	Elizabeth I of England	Episode 2.07 (Duggan); Episode 3.03 (MacCauley); Episode 4.01 (Murray)	Episode 2.10 (Duggan); Episode 3.07 (MacCauley); Episode 4.10 (Murray)
The daughter of Henry and Anne Boleyn. During Elizabeth's infancy, she is proclaimed Princess of England and the Act of Succession nominates her as the heir to the throne, supplanting her older half-sister, Mary, who is sent to Elizabeth's establishment at Hatfield to wait on her. Shortly before Anne's execution, her marriage to Henry is annulled, making Elizabeth illegitimate. She is removed from the line of succession and referred to only as Lady Elizabeth. In the aftermath of Anne's execution, Henry is initially unwilling to have anything to do with Elizabeth, claiming not to believe that she is his child, but when Elizabeth's half-sister, Mary, and stepmother, Jane Seymour, arrange for her to be brought to court and presented to her father for Christmas 1536, she is welcomed. She later attends the christening of her half-brother, Edward, and goes to live at Hundson with Mary. In 1540 Elizabeth and Mary are present at court to greet their newest stepmother, Anne of Cleves. During Henry's marriage to Catherine Howard, Elizabeth is much warmer to her than Mary, but makes no secret of her preference for Anne of Cleves, and spends most of her free time at Hever Castle (Anne's residence and Elizabeth's ancestral home). Elizabeth treats her restoration to the succession with dread, and declares to Mary, with God as her witness, that she will never marry. Elizabeth develops a closeness to her sister and brother. She is seen to be good friends with Anne of Cleves and, in the fourth season, grows close to Catherine Parr, who vows to raise Elizabeth in the faith of her mother. However, throughout all of this, she and her father remain somewhat distant. By the end Henry acknowledges, while conversing with the spirit of Anne Boleyn, that he has always been proud of his daughter and does recognise that she is very intelligent. He also reveals that he wishes that he could have shown her more affection but that her resemblance to her mother (Elizabeth looked like her father, but had her mother's eyes and personality) made him keep her at arm's length.
Lady Ursula Misseldon	Charlotte Salt (2009)	Mary Shelton or Margaret Skipwith	Episode 3.01	Episode 3.05
A lady in waiting to Queen Jane, though not a historical figure. She is the mistress of Sir Francis Bryan and subsequently King Henry, who finds her boldness arousing. She arrives at court during the wedding celebrations. She is engaged to be married but does not think twice of using her body for advancement and reward. Before she returns home she has passionate sex with a depressed Henry after Queen Jane's death. Mary Shelton and Margaret Skipwith were ladies of the court who were linked romantically to Henry VIII (but not to Francis Bryan) in court gossip during the period following Queen Jane's death.
Cardinal Reginald Pole	Mark Hildreth (2009)	Reginald Pole	Episode 3.01	Episode 3.07
A Catholic priest studying in Italy, Pole is also an heir of the House of Plantagenet via his mother, Margaret Pole, the Countess of Salisbury. Reginald is created a Cardinal by the Pope, and with the guidance of his mentor, Cardinal von Waldburg, seeks to undermine Henry VIII's throne by taking advantage of the civil unrest in Yorkshire to encourage the King's foreign enemies to support the rebellion. Henry's outrage over this is visited on Pole's family.
Anne Seymour, Viscountess Beauchamp	Emma Hamilton (2007)	Anne Seymour, Duchess of Somerset	Episode 3.03	Episode 4.10
Anne is the wife of Edward Seymour, but she feels no passion for her aloof husband, and has an affair with Sir Francis Bryan. Later she has dalliances with the Earl of Surrey, but grows to despise him after he writes unflattering prose about her, and with Edward's brother Thomas, for whom she claims to bear a child. She provides gunpowder to the executioner so that Anne Askew will die quickly when burned at the stake for being a heretic.
Prince Edward Tudor	? (2009); Eoin Murtagh (2010); Jake Hathaway (2010)	Edward VI	Episode 3.04 (?); Episode 4.01 (Murtagh); Episode 4.10 (Hathaway)	Episode 3.08 (?); Episode 4.08 (Murtagh); Episode 4.10 (Hathaway)
Henry's only son; born to Jane Seymour. As the long-awaited male heir Edward is shown to the people in his father's arms. Close to both of his half-sisters Mary and Elizabeth, Edward succeeds Henry as King albeit only briefly, as he died aged 15 from tuberculosis.
Thomas Seymour	Andrew McNair (2009–2010)	Thomas Seymour, 1st Baron Seymour of Sudeley	Episode 3.04	Episode 4.10
Younger brother to Edward Seymour, older brother to Queen Jane, and uncle to Prince Edward Tudor. Thomas appears as an associate of Sir Francis Bryan, in their attempt to find and kill Cardinal Pole.
Joan Bulmer	Catherine Steadman (2010)	Joan Bulmer	Episode 4.01	Episode 4.05
Joan Bulmer is a former acquaintance of Catherine Howard, from their time in the household of the Dowager Duchess of Norfolk, who wishes to be placed in the new Queen's household. Later she is called upon to testify against Catherine Howard.

== See also ==
- George Throckmorton
- Richard Rich, 1st Baron Rich
- Margaret (Madge) Shelton
- Philippe de Chabot
- William Kingston
- Hans Holbein the Younger
- Elizabeth Boleyn, Countess of Wiltshire, wife of Thomas Boleyn
- Stephen Gardiner
- John Lambert (martyr)
- Henry Pole, 1st Baron Montagu
- Thomas Wriothesley, 1st Earl of Southampton (Lord Risley)
- Anne Parr, Countess of Pembroke (Lady Herbert)
