= Polly Stenham =

English playwright

Polly Stenham MBE FRSL
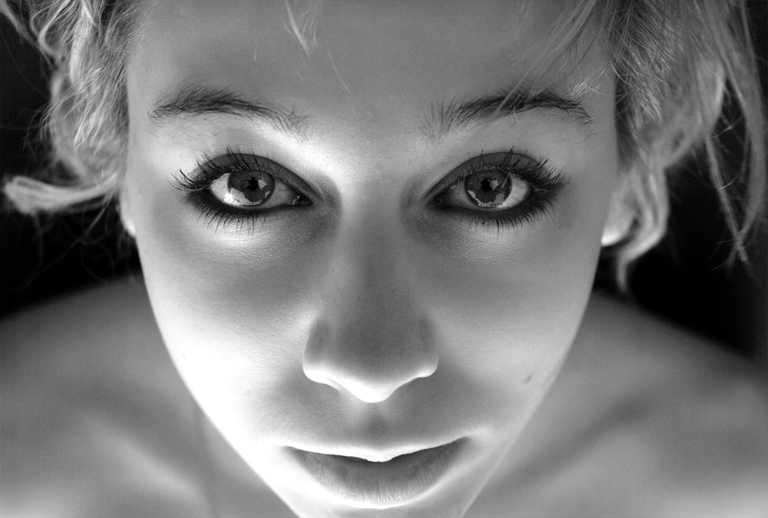
- Born: 16 July 1986 (age 40); London, England
- Education: Wycombe Abbey
- Occupations: Playwright, screenwriter, director
- Writing career
- Years active: 2005–present
- Notable works: That Face, Tusk Tusk, No Quarter, Hotel, Julie

Polly Stenham MBE FRSL (born 16 July 1986) is an English playwright known for her play That Face, which she wrote when she was 19 years old.

== Background ==
Stenham was born and raised in London. She attributes her love of theatre to her father, Cob Stenham as he took her to various shows from a young age, including many at the Royal Court Theatre which would later stage her first play.

Before university she attended Wycombe Abbey and later worked for the Ambassador Theatre Group and the Arcola Theatre. During this time she enrolled in the Royal Court Young Writers Programme and wrote her first play.

== Career ==
Stenham's debut play That Face premiered at the Royal Court Theatre in London in April 2007. It was directed by Jeremy Herrin and starred Lindsay Duncan as the alcoholic mother Martha and Matt Smith as her son Henry. Stenham won the Evening Standard's 2007 Charles Wintour Award, the Critics' Circle Award for Most Promising Playwright and the 2007 Theatrical Management Association Award for Best New Play.

The play received praise from some reviewers, with Charles Spencer of The Daily Telegraph commenting:

This is one of the most astonishing debuts I have seen in more than 30 years of theatre reviewing. Its author, Polly Stenham, a graduate of the Royal Court's Young Writers Programme, is 20 now, just 19 when she wrote a play that sent me reeling into the night... In every respect this is a remarkable and unforgettable piece of theatre.

Stenham represented the Royal Court at the 2007 Latitude Festival before That Face transferred to the Duke of York's Theatre in the West End in 2008 with largely the same cast and again under Jeremy Herrin's direction.

Her second play, Tusk Tusk premiered in the downstairs theatre at the Royal Court in March 2009 directed by Jeremy Herrin.

In 2011 Stenham, along with friend Victoria Williams, opened an art gallery, the Cob Studios and Gallery (named after her art collector father) in Camden, London.

In 2013 her third play No Quarter was staged at the Royal Court, directed by Jeremy Herrin and starring Tom Sturridge. The company also included Taron Egerton in his first year after studying at RADA.

In 2013 film director Nicolas Winding Refn confirmed I Walk With the Dead as his next project and that Polly Stenham was confirmed to write the screenplay with Refn. They stated that the film will have an all female cast. Refn admitted that he asked Stenham to write the screenplay to tackle his own perceived inability to write female characters. The project was later renamed The Neon Demon and was released in June 2016 to mixed reviews.

In 2014 her fourth play Hotel was staged at the Temporary Theatre, The National Theatre, directed by Maria Aberg.

In 2018, Julie, her adaptation of August Strindberg's Miss Julie, was staged at Lyttleton Theatre, directed by Carrie Cracknell and starring Vanessa Kirby and Eric Kofi AbrefaIn.

In 2017, Walter & Zoniel's portrait of Stenham was hung at the National Portrait Gallery. In 2018, Stenham was elected as a Fellow of the Royal Society of Literature in its "40 Under 40" initiative.

In October 2019 her first collection, Plays I, comprising her first four plays, That Face, Tusk Tusk, No Quarter and Hotel was published by Faber & Faber. Stenham's work is studied at GCSE, A-level and University level.

She is currently developing the TV series Dope Girls with Bad Wolf Productions.

Stenham was appointed Member of the Order of the British Empire (MBE) in the 2020 Birthday Honours for services to theatre and literature.

== Private life ==
Stenham lives in London.

She is a fan of Radiohead's album In Rainbows, which she says she listened to constantly while writing Tusk Tusk.

== Work ==
- Plays I (2019) published by Faber & Faber
- Julie (2018) at the Royal National Theatre directed by Carrie Cracknell
- Hotel (2014) at the Royal National Theatre directed by Maria Aberg
- No Quarter (2013) at the Royal Court Theatre directed by Jeremy Herrin
- Tusk Tusk (2009) at the Royal Court Theatre directed by Jeremy Herrin
- That Face (2007) at the Royal Court Theatre then (2008) Duke of York (2009) directed by Jeremy Herrin
