= Cob Stenham =

British businessman

Anthony William Paul Stenham (28 January 1932 – 22 October 2006), and named "Cob" after Richard Cobden, was a director of Unilever for sixteen years, the chairman of Ajro Wiggins Appleton from 1991 and on the board and latterly chairman of Telewest, for twelve years from 1994 to 2006. He died of a heart attack and was buried on the west side of Highgate Cemetery.

== Background and family ==
Stenham was educated at Eton and Trinity College, Cambridge (law and economics). His daughters are the playwright, Polly Stenham, and Daisy Stenham.
