= Take no prisoners (disambiguation) =

Take no prisoners is an informal military term for giving no quarter. The phrase may also refer to:

- Take No Prisoners (2008), a professional wrestling event held by Ring of Honor
  - Take No Prisoners (2009)
- Take No Prisoners (film), a 2025 American documentary film on hostage negotiations featuring Roger D. Carstens
- Take No Prisoners (Peabo Bryson album)
- Take No Prisoners (David Byron album)
- Take No Prisoners (Molly Hatchet album)
- Live: Take No Prisoners, an album by Lou Reed
- "Take No Prisoners", a song by Megadeth from their fourth album Rust In Peace
- "Take No Prisoners", a song by Janis Ian from her fifteenth album Revenge
- "Take No Prisoners", a song by Hot Water Music from their eighth album Exister
- Take No Prisoners (video game), a computer game by Raven Software
