= Joan Bulmer =

English courtier (1519–1590)

Joan Bulmer (1519 – December 1590), born Joan Acworth, was an English gentlewoman and courtier.

== Life ==
Born in Toddington, Bedfordshire, Joan was the daughter of George Acworth and Margaret Wilberforce. Her maternal grandfather was Christopher Wilberforce of Egglestone and her grandmother was Elizabeth Broughton (the Broughtons were relations of the Howard family. Joan also had a brother, John as well several half-siblings from her fathers first marriage to Eleanor Niter; George, Anne, Frances, and Thomas. Joan's father died in 1530, when she was just eleven years of age, and two years later her mother was remarried to John Danyell. After her mother's death sometime around 1539, Joan, as the sole heir was set to inherit property, but this was opposed by Danyell.

Joan married William Bulmer in 1539 at the age of twenty. The marriage was unhappy, and the couple were separated. She later entered the service of Agnes Tilney, the Dowager Duchess of Norfolk. While in service to the duchess, Bulmer became acquainted with Katherine Howard, who would later become the fifth wife of King Henry VIII. It was during this time that Joan became involved in an affair with Edward Waldegrave.

After Katherine Howard married Henry VIII, Bulmer requested a place in the royal household based on their previous association. Following Katherine's arrest, Bulmer was called upon to testify against the Queen and detail the aspects of her early life.

After Katherine's trial and execution, Bulmer was released. She subsequently went on to marry Edward Waldegrave and resided at Lawford Hall in Essex. A letter from her to Katherine has survived.

== Issue ==
- Anne, married Humprey Monoux
- Edward
- Bridget, married John Kighley
- Mary, married Isaac Astley
- Margery, married William Clopton

== In film and television ==
Joan Bulmer is depicted in the fourth series of The Tudors by Catherine Steadman.
