= Poisoning Act 1530 =

Act of the Parliament of England

- Act of Parliament
- Parliament of England
- Long title: An Act for Poisoning.
- Citation: 22 Hen. 8. c. 9
- Territorial extent: England and Wales

Dates
- Royal assent: 31 March 1531
- Commencement: 16 January 1531 (Note: Start of session.)
- Repealed: 28 July 1863

Other legislation
- Amended by: Treason Act 1547
- Repealed by: Statute Law Revision Act 1863
- Relates to: Treason Act 1351; Treason Act 1547

Status: Repealed

Text of statute as originally enacted

The Poisoning Act 1530 (22 Hen. 8. c. 9) was an act of the Parliament of England. Its long title was "An Act for Poisoning." It made it high treason to murder someone with poison, and instead of the usual punishment for treason (hanging, drawing and quartering) it imposed death by boiling. The act was rapidly introduced in and passed by Parliament in reaction to the apparent attempted poisoning of John Fisher, Bishop of Rochester, and led to the execution of the cook Richard Roose the following year.

== Repeal ==
The act was virtually repealed so far as related to treason by the Treason Act 1547. The remaining provision empowered Justices of the Peace to inquire of the counterfeiting of coin of an outward realm current in the Kingdom of England by the King's assent and Justices of Assize to hear and determine such counterfeiting.

The whole act was repealed by section 1 of, and the schedule to, the Statute Law Revision Act 1863 (26 & 27 Vict. c. 125), which came into force on 28 July 1863.

== See also ==
- High treason in the United Kingdom
- Treason Act
- Treason Act 1351
