= Melton (surname) =

Melton is a Scottish surname, and is derived from Anglo-Saxon (Old English) medeltone or meltuna, from the Old English words middel, meaning "middle" or "between two places", and tun, meaning "settlement".

== Notable people with the surname ==
=== A ===
- Annette Melton (born 1985), Australian actress
- Arthur Melton (1906–1978), American psychologist

=== B ===
- Babe Melton (1898–??), American baseball player
- Barry Melton (born 1947), American musician
- Bill Melton (1945–2024), American baseball player
- Bo Melton (born 1999), American football player
- Bryant Melton (born 1940), American politician
- Buck Melton (1923–2014), American politician

=== C ===
- Carl D. Melton (1927–2016), American politician and judge
- Charles Melton (born 1991), American actor and model
- Chuck Melton (born 1982), American wheelchair rugby player
- Cliff Melton (1912–1986), American baseball player

=== D ===
- Darrio Melton, American politician
- Dave Melton (1928–2008), American baseball player
- De'Anthony Melton (born 1998), American basketball player
- Douglas A. Melton (born 1953), American investigator
- Dustin Melton (born 1995), Zimbabwean-South African cricketer

=== E ===
- Eddie Melton (born 1980/1981), American politician
- Emory Melton (1923–2015), American politician

=== F ===
- Florence Melton (1911–2007), American inventor
- Frank Melton (1949–2009), American politician

=== H ===
- Harold Melton (born 1966), American judge
- Henry Melton (born 1986), American football player
- H. Keith Melton, American intelligence historian
- Howell W. Melton (1923–2015), American lawyer and judge

=== J ===
- Jacob Melton (born 2000), American baseball player
- James Melton (1904–1961), American singer
- J. Gordon Melton (born 1942), American religious scholar
- John Melton (??–1640), English politician and author
- Jovan Melton, American politician
- Justin Melton (born 1987), Filipino-American basketball player

=== K ===
- Kate Melton (born 1992), American actress
- Kent Melton (1955–2024), American sculptor

=== L ===
- Lou Alta Melton (1895–1974), American civil engineer
- Lynn Melton, American politician

=== M ===
- Matthew Melton (born 1982), American musician
- Max Melton (born 2002), American football player
- Mel Melton, American musician
- Mitchell Melton (1943–2013), American politician

=== P ===
- Parvati Melton (born 1989), Indian model
- Patrick Melton (born 1975), American screenwriter

=== R ===
- Richard Huntington Melton (born 1935), American ambassador
- Rube Melton (1917–1971), American baseball player

=== S ===
- Sean Melton (born 1994), American artistic gymnast
- Sid Melton (1917–2011), American actor
- Steve Melton (born 1978), English footballer
- Steve Melton (businessman) (born 1962), English businessman

=== T ===
- Terrence Melton (born 1977), American football player
- Troy Melton (1921–1995), American stuntman and actor
- Troy Melton (baseball) (born 2000), American baseball player

=== W ===
- William Melton (disambiguation), multiple people

== See also ==
- Senator Melton (disambiguation), a disambiguation page for Senators surnamed "Melton"
