= Melton =

Melton may refer to:

== Places ==
- Melton, Victoria, a suburb of Melbourne, Australia
  - City of Melton, the local government area containing the suburb and surrounding area
  - Electoral district of Melton, the Victorian Legislative Assembly district containing the suburb and surrounding area
  - Melton railway station, Melbourne, a railway station in Melton South
  - Melton South, Victoria, a suburb of Melton
  - Melton West, Victoria, a suburb of Melton
- Borough of Melton, a local government district in Leicestershire, England
  - Melton Mowbray, the main town of Melton borough, England
  - Melton (UK Parliament constituency)
- Melton, East Riding of Yorkshire, England
- Melton, Suffolk, England
  - Melton railway station, Suffolk, a railway station in Melton

== Other uses ==
- Melton (cloth), a twill woven and felted woolen cloth
- Melton (horse), a British Thoroughbred racehorse
- Melton (surname)
- a brand of brass instruments by Meinl-Weston
