= Senator Milton =

Senator Milton may refer to:

- John Gerald Milton (1881–1977), U.S. Senator from New Jersey in 1938
- John Watson Milton (born 1935), Minnesota State Senate
- William Hall Milton (1864–1942), US Senator from Florida from 1908 to 1909

== See also ==
- Senator Melton (disambiguation)
