= Death by boiling =

Execution method

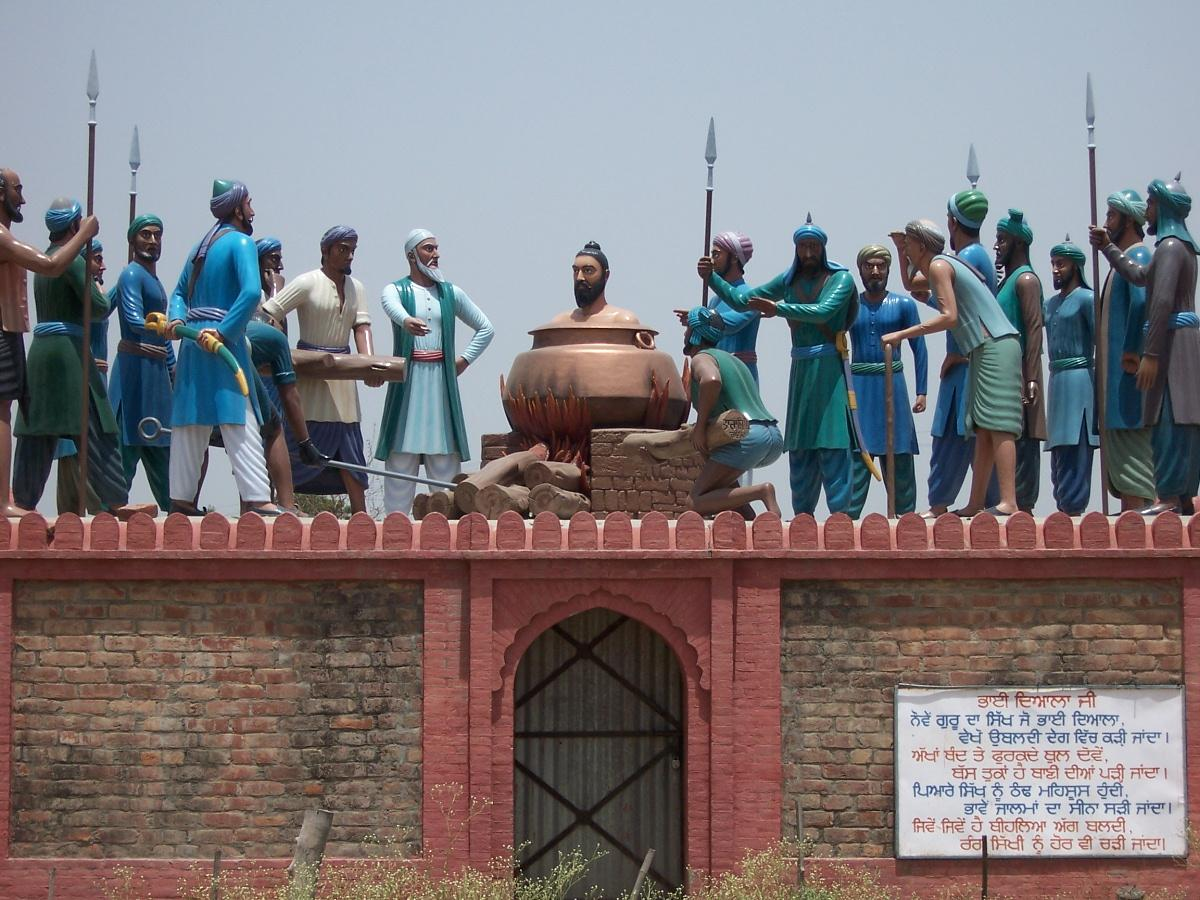
Depiction of the martyrdom of the Sikh Bhai Dayala by being boiled alive on the orders of Mughal Emperor Aurangzeb in November 1675 AD

Death by boiling is a method of execution in which a person is killed by being immersed in a boiling liquid. While not as common as other methods of execution, boiling to death has been practiced in many parts of Europe and Asia. Due to the lengthy process, death by boiling is an extremely painful method of execution. Executions of this type were often carried out using a large vessel such as a cauldron or a sealed kettle filled with a liquid such as water, oil, tar, or tallow, and sometimes a hook and pulley system. Instances of boiling alive as a legal punishment were quite rare and infrequent compared to other forms of execution, such as drowning.

== Historical practice ==
=== Europe ===
In England, the use of boiling alive as a method of execution was rare. The ninth statute passed in 1531 (the 22nd year of the reign of King Henry VIII) made boiling alive the prescriptive form of capital punishment for murder committed by poisoning, which by the same Act was defined as high treason. This arose from a February 1531 incident in which the Bishop of Rochester's cook, Richard Roose, gave several people poisoned porridge, resulting in two deaths. A partial confession having been extracted by torture, the sentence was thus imposed by attainder and without benefit of clergy. His execution took place on April 15, 1532, at Smithfield. A contemporary chronicle reports the following:

He roared mighty loud, and divers women who were big with child did feel sick at the sight of what they saw, and were carried away half dead; and other men and women did not seem frightened by the boiling alive, but would prefer to see the headsman at his work.

Boiling to death was employed again in 1542 for a woman, Margaret Davy, who had also used poison. During the reign of Edward VI, in 1547, the 1531 act was repealed.

Numerous people have been boiled to death in Scotland. For example, with the consent of Jon Haraldsson, the "Bloody Earl" of Orkney, the bishop of Caithness, Adam of Melrose, and a monk named Surlo are said to have been boiled to death by angry husbandmen in 1222 over the bishop's aggressive means of collecting tithes. Alexander II is said to have executed upwards of eighty persons as a punishment for killing the bishop and monk, and the earl fled his lands. But according to the Melrose Chronicle, Adam of Melrose was "burned alive", rather than boiled, and Alexander II executed up to 400 for the crime against the clergy.

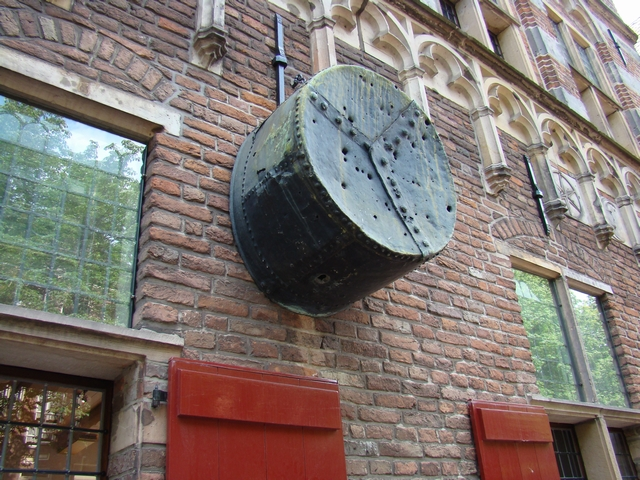
Execution cauldron at Deventer (Netherlands)

William de Soules, a nobleman involved in a conspiracy against Robert the Bruce, was reputed to be a sorcerer consorting with evil spirits, and was boiled alive in 1321 at Ninestane Rig. Around 1420, Melville, the sheriff of the Mearns and laird of Glenbervie, who was resented for his strictness, was apprehended by some other nobles and thrown into the kettle. The nobles are said to have each taken a spoonful of the brew afterwards.

Boiling as an execution method was also used for counterfeiters, swindlers and coin forgers during the Middle Ages. In the Holy Roman Empire, for example, being boiled to death in oil is recorded for coin forgers and extremely grave murderers. In 1392, a man was boiled alive in Nuremberg for having raped and murdered his own mother. Coin forgers were boiled to death in 1452 in Danzig and in 1471 in Stralsund. Even as late as 1687, a man in Bremen was boiled to death in oil for having been of valuable help to some coin forgers who had escaped justice.

In the Dutch town of Deventer, the kettle that was used for boiling criminals to death can still be seen.

=== Asia ===
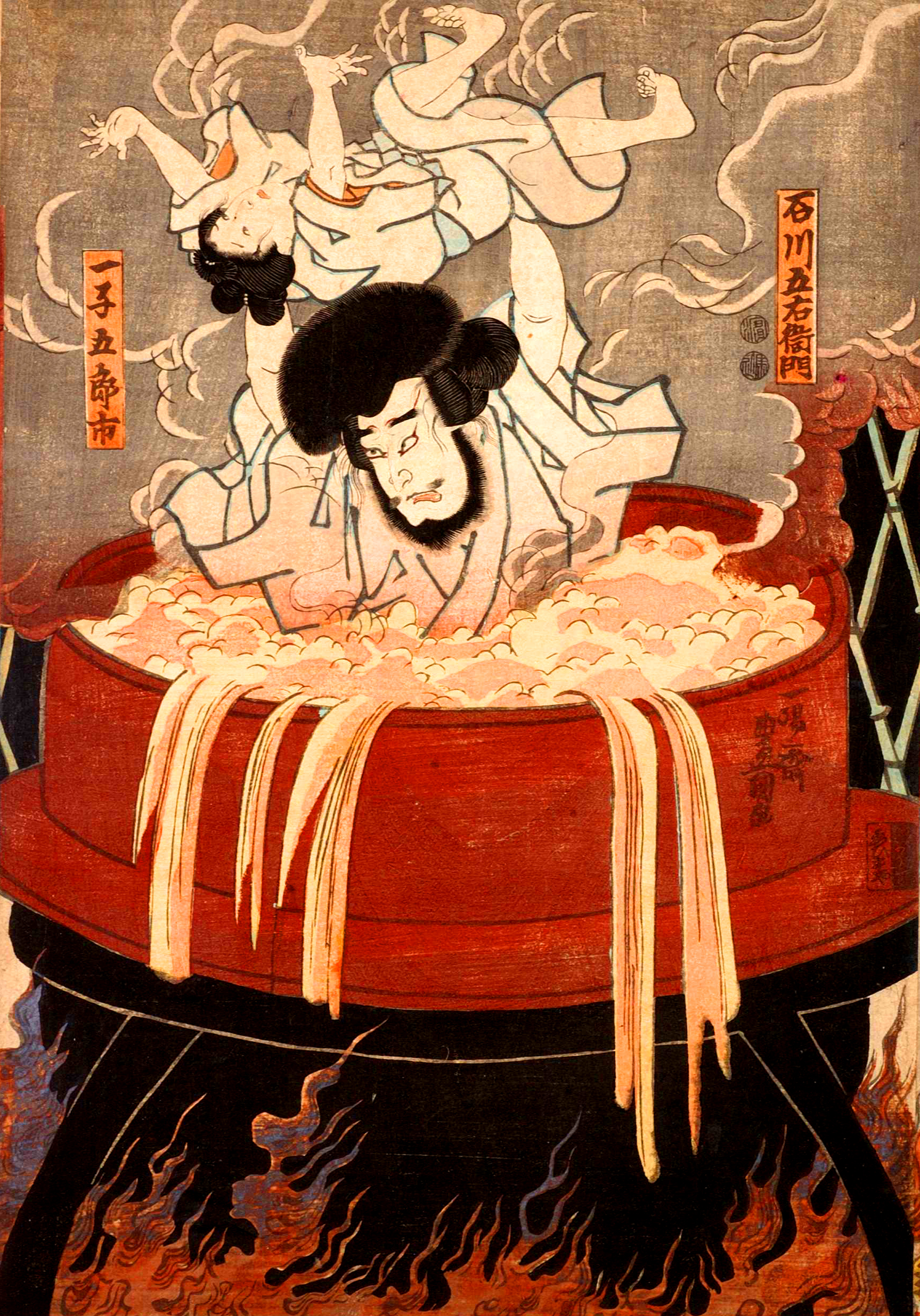
Execution of Ishikawa Goemon and his son

In Nishapur, Iran in the 740s Abu Muslim boiled the leader of the rival Alids to death in a cauldron. In 16th-century Japan, the semi-legendary Japanese bandit Ishikawa Goemon and his son were boiled alive in the 1590s by Toyotomi Hideyoshi. In 1675, a Sikh martyr called Bhai Dayala was boiled to death in Delhi after he refused to convert to Islam. He was put into a cauldron full of cold water which was then heated to boiling point. Sikh scriptures record that Dayala recited the Japji of Guru Nanak and the Sukhmani of Guru Arjan as he died.

=== Americas ===
Thomas Ewbank relates in his 1856 book Life in Brazil that he was told of an enslaved Afro-Brazilian being publicly boiled to death by a plantation owner as punishment for acts of insubordination.

=== Modern times ===
Early in the Soviet anti-religious campaign, clergy members were subjected to brutal torture and executions, with documents revealing that, among other extreme atrocities, they were thrown into cauldrons of boiling tar. Additionally, the Cheka, the first Soviet secret police organization, which was also known for committing brutal repression, would execute officers of the White movement by putting them into a tank of boiling water, then into cold bodies of water, then back into extreme heat in Odesa.

The government of Uzbekistan under Islam Karimov (1991–2016) was alleged to have boiled suspected terrorists.

In a United States Department of State document from 2004, the following is written:

During the year, there were no developments or investigations in the following 2002 deaths in custody: Asilbek Sa’diyev and Shahzodjon Muzafarov, members of gang band who were tortured to death in Jaslyk Prison in Karakalpakstan resulting in extensive bruises and burns, the latter reportedly caused by immersion in boiling water.

Former ISIS commander Abu Abboud al-Raqqawi referred to ISIS's brutal execution methods, among which was boiling prisoners alive in engine oil:

Some people were boiled alive in oil. Engine oil. They burned wood on a fire for an hour before throwing the victim into boiling oil. It's the Tunisians who were responsible for that.

In the 2010 documentary El Sicario, Room 164, the masked sicario interviewee claims that the Mexican cartels boil in oil those found to be working for the police.

== Depictions in Western culture ==
Early reports from the Pacific, including Fiji and Papua New Guinea, of cannibals killing Western Christian missionaries were assumed to involve some form of boiling alive. This became a fertile ground for film makers and especially cartoonists, whose clichéd depiction of tourists or missionaries sitting restrained in a large cauldron above a wood fire and surrounded by bone-nosed tribesmen was a staple of popular magazines and films for decades.

Punishment by boiling also features in both the 1980 and 2024 television adaptations of the novel Shōgun, the 1985 film adaptation of King Solomon's Mines and the dream sequence in the film Bagdad Café.

Fromental Halévy's 1835 opera La Juive ends with Rachel (the title character) being boiled alive in a vat of oil after her relationship with the Christian prince Léopold is discovered by antisemitic state and church authorities.

== See also ==
- Outline of capital punishment
