= William Melton (disambiguation) =

William Melton (died 1340) was archbishop of York.

William Melton may also refer to:

- William Melton (priest) (died 1528), tutor of John Fisher in Cambridge
- William Melton of Aston and Kyllon, MP for Yorkshire (UK Parliament constituency)
- Bill Melton (born 1945), American baseball player
