= Thomas Ewbank =

English writer

Thomas Ewbank (11 March 1792 – 16 September 1870) was an English writer on practical mechanics, who was United States Commissioner of Patents from 1849 to 1852.

== Life ==
Ewbank was born at Barnard Castle, Durham, on 11 March 1792. When thirteen years of age he began work as a plumber and brassfounder. In 1812 he went to London, where he was employed in making cases for preserved meats. His spare hours were given to reading. In 1819 he emigrated to America, and next year began business in New York City as a manufacturer of lead, tin, and copper tubing. In 1836 he was able to retire from business and devote himself to studies and writings on mechanics. In 1845–6 he travelled in Brazil, and on his return published an account of his travels as Life in Brazil.

He was appointed United States Commissioner of Patents by President Taylor in 1849. He was attacked for the manner in which he fulfilled the duties of his office, which he held till 1852. Ewbank was one of the founders and president of the American Ethnological Society. He died at New York on 16 September 1870.

== Works ==
- ‘'A Description of the Indian Antiquities Brought From Chile and Peru, By the U.S. Astronomical Expedition" printed in "The U.S. Naval Astronomical Expedition to the Southern Hemisphere During 1849-'50-'51-'52" Washington: A.O.P. Nicholson Printer, 1855.
- The World a Workshop, or the Physical Relation of Man to the Earth, New York, 1855.
- Life in Brazil; or, A Journal of a Visit to the Land of the Cocoa and the Palm, With an Appendix, Containing Illustrations of Ancient South American Arts in Recently Discovered Implements and Products of Domestic Industry, and Works in Stone, Pottery, Gold, Silver, Bronze, &c., New York, 1856.
- Thoughts on Matter and Force, New York, 1856.
- Reminiscences of the Patent Office, and of Scenes and Things in Washington, New York, 1859 (not extant).
- Inorganic Forces ordained to supersede Human Slavery, New York, 1860.
- A Descriptive and Historical Account of Hydraulic and other Machines for Raising Water, Ancient and Modern, including the progressive development of the Steam Engine, New York, 1845, 16th ed. 1876.

Ewbank also wrote a number of scattered papers on scientific subjects. Many of them appeared in the Transactions of the Franklin Institute. His 'Experiments on Marine Propulsion, or the Virtue of Form in Propelling Blades,’ attracted some attention in Europe.
