= John Fisher =

Bishop of Rochester (c.1469–1535)

Saint John Fisher
- Cardinal; Bishop of Rochester
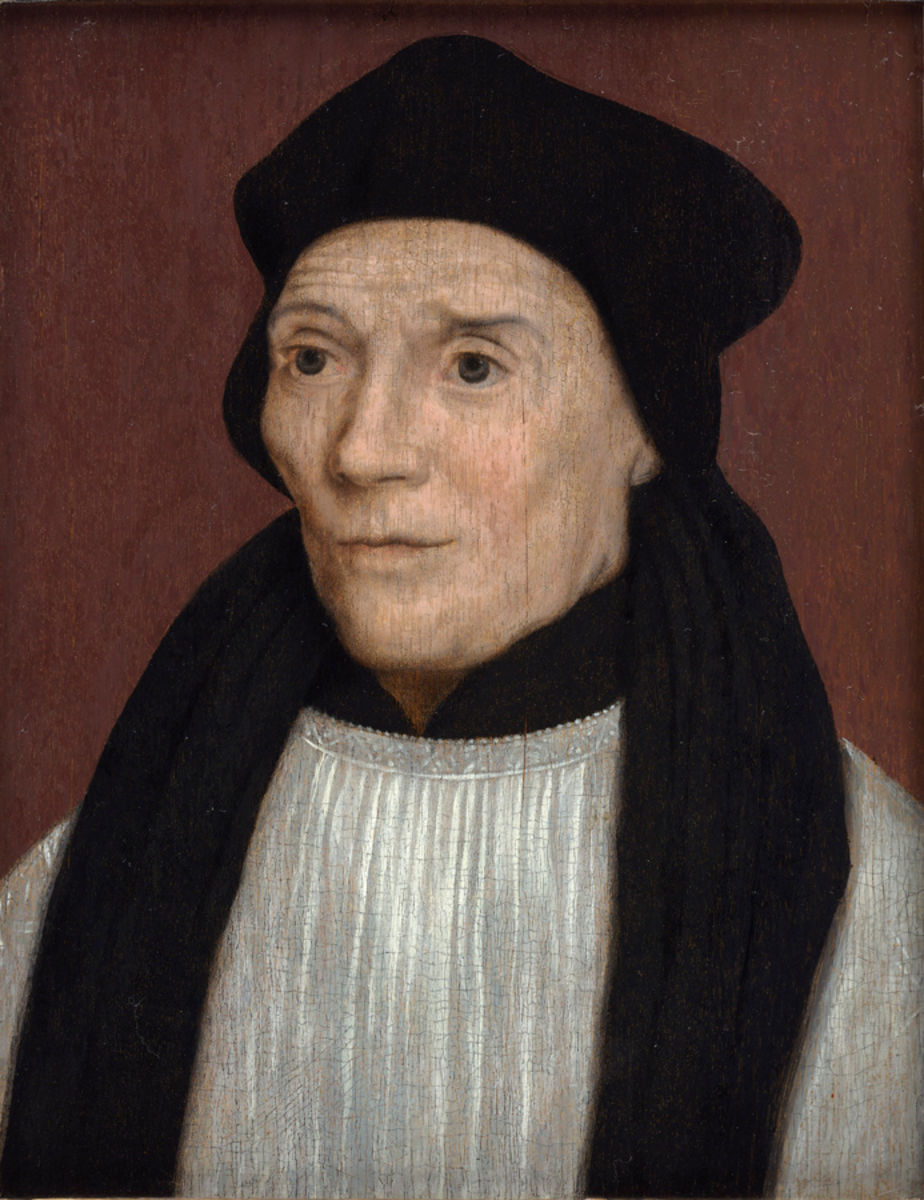
- Depicted by a follower of Hans Holbein the Younger
- Church: Catholic Church in England and Wales
- Metropolis: Canterbury
- Diocese: Rochester
- See: Rochester
- Appointed: 14 October 1504
- Installed: 24 April 1505
- Term ended: 2 January 1535
- Predecessor: Richard FitzJames
- Successor: Nicholas Heath
- Other post: Cardinal-Priest of San Vitale

Orders
- Ordination: 17 December 1491 by Thomas Rotherham
- Consecration: 24 November 1504 by William Warham
- Created cardinal: 21 May 1535 by Pope Paul III
- Rank: Bishop, Cardinal-Priest

Personal details
- Born: c. 19 October 1469 Beverley, Yorkshire, Kingdom of England
- Died: 22 June 1535 (aged 65) Tower Hill, London, Kingdom of England
- Motto: faciam vos fieri piscatores hominum ("I shall make you fishers of men")
- Coat of arms: John Fisher's coat of arms

Sainthood
- Feast day: 22 June (Catholic Church); 6 July (Church of England); 9 July (Catholic pre-1969)
- Venerated in: Catholic Church, Anglicanism
- Title as Saint: Bishop and martyr, Bishop of Rochester
- Beatified: 29 December 1886; Rome, Kingdom of Italy, by Pope Leo XIII
- Canonized: 19 May 1935; Vatican City, by Pope Pius XI
- Patronage: Roman Catholic Diocese of Rochester; Rochester, New York

Styles of John Fisher
- Informal style: Cardinal

John Fisher (c. 19 October 1469 – 22 June 1535) was an English Catholic prelate who served as Bishop of Rochester from 1504 to 1535 and as chancellor of the University of Cambridge. He is honoured as a martyr and saint by the Catholic Church.

Fisher was executed by order of Henry VIII during the English Reformation for refusing to accept him as Supreme Head of the Church of England and for upholding the Catholic Church's doctrine of papal supremacy and the independence of the Church from control by the State. He was named a cardinal shortly before his death.

In answer to a popular petition of English Catholics, Pope Pius XI canonized John Fisher and Thomas More on 19 May 1935 as representatives of the many Catholic martyrs of England. The two martyrs share a common feast day on 22 June in the current General Roman Calendar of the Catholic Church. His name also appears in some Anglican calendars of saints.

== Biography ==
=== Early life ===
John Fisher was born at Beverley, Yorkshire in 1469, the son of Robert Fisher, a prosperous mercer of Beverley, and Agnes, his wife, with whom he had four children. Robert Fisher died in 1477, and was buried in St. Mary's, the parish church; in his will, he made bequests to his children and various poorhouses, churches, and priests, as well as providing Mass stipends.

John was then eight years old. His widowed mother subsequently married a man named White, to whom she bore four further children.

Fisher's early education was probably at the school attached to the collegiate church in his home town. He seems to have had close contacts with his extended family all his life.

=== University of Cambridge ===
Acknowledging Fisher's aptitude for learning, and being financially comfortable, his mother assented to his admission to the University of Cambridge, in 1482, at the age of twelve or thirteen.

The University of Cambridge had regressed and stagnated academically. In an oration delivered before Henry VII in 1506, Fisher recalled:

"At the time when your majesty first showed your concern for us, learning had begun to decline among us—this may have been the result of constant litigation with the town, or of the frequent plagues that beset us so that we lost many of our leading scholars, or of the lack of patrons of learning. Whatever the cause, we should indeed have been reduced to despair had not your majesty shone down upon us like the rising sun itself."

Fisher studied at the University of Cambridge from 1484, where at Michaelhouse he came under the influence of William Melton, a pastorally-minded theologian open to the new current of reform in studies arising from the Renaissance. Fisher received the Bachelor of Arts degree in 1487. In 1491 he proceeded to a Master of Arts degree and was elected a fellow of his college.

Also in 1491 Fisher received a papal dispensation to be ordained to the priesthood despite being under the canonical age. On 17 December 1491 he was ordained into the priesthood, and appointed (nominal) Vicar of Northallerton, Yorkshire.

In 1494 he resigned this benefice to become proctor of the University and three years later was appointed master debater and about the same time he was also appointed chaplain and confessor to Margaret Beaufort, Countess of Richmond and Derby, mother of King Henry VII.

On 5 July 1501, he received the degree of doctor of sacred theology and 10 days later was elected Vice-Chancellor of the university. Under Fisher's guidance, his patroness Lady Margaret founded St John's and Christ's Colleges at Cambridge, and a Lady Margaret Professorship of Divinity at each of the two universities at Oxford and Cambridge. Fisher himself became the first occupant of the Cambridge chair. From 1505 to 1508 he was also the President of Queens' College. At the end of July 1516 he was at Cambridge for the opening of St John's College and consecrated the chapel.

Fisher's strategy was to assemble funds and attract to Cambridge leading scholars from Europe, promoting the study not only of Classical Latin and Greek authors, but of Hebrew. He placed great weight upon pastoral commitment, above all popular preaching, on the part of the endowed fellows. Fisher had a vision to which he dedicated all his personal resources and energies. Despite occasional opposition, he managed to administer the entire university, one of only two in England, conceiving and seeing through long-term projects.

Fisher's foundations were also dedicated to prayer for the dead, especially through chantry foundations. A stern and austere man, Fisher was known to place a human skull on the altar during Mass and on the table during meals.

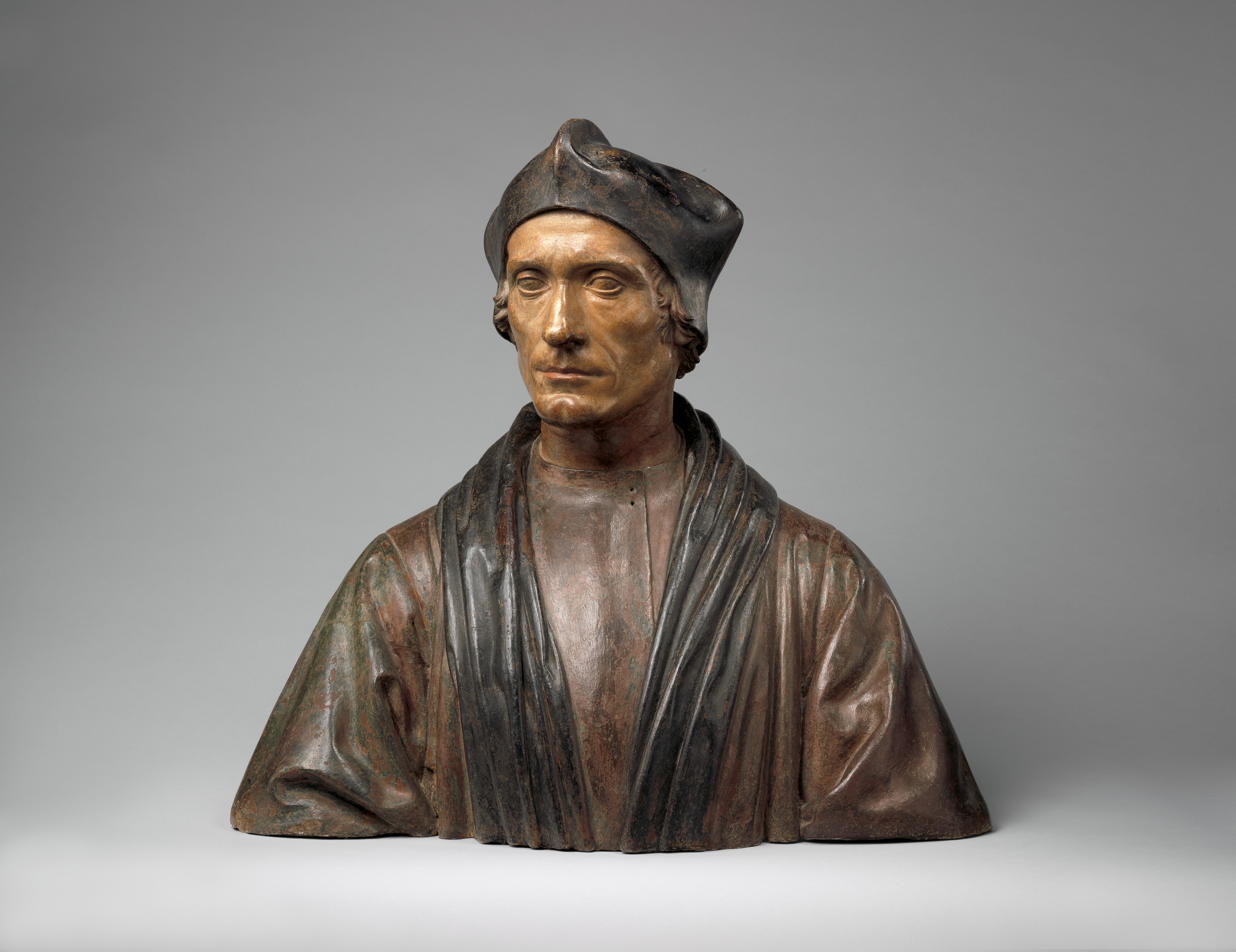
John Fisher as a young man by Pietro Torrigiano.

Erasmus said of John Fisher: "He is the one man at this time who is incomparable for uprightness of life, for learning and for greatness of soul."

=== Bishop ===
By papal bull dated 14 October 1504, Fisher was appointed bishop of Rochester, at the personal insistence of Henry VII. Rochester was then the poorest diocese in England and usually seen as a first step on an episcopal career. Nonetheless, Fisher stayed there, presumably by his own choice, for the remaining 31 years of his life.

At the same time, like any English bishop of his day, Fisher had certain state duties. These included in particular, his role regarding the University of Cambridge, in which he maintained a passionate interest. In 1504 he was elected the university's chancellor. Re-elected annually for 10 years, Fisher ultimately received a lifetime appointment. At this date he is also said to have acted as tutor to the future king, Henry VIII. As a preacher, his reputation was so great that he was appointed to preach the funeral oration for King Henry VII and the Lady Margaret, both of whom died in 1509, the texts being extant. Besides the part he played in the Lady Margaret's foundations, Fisher gave further proof of his zeal for learning by inducing Erasmus to visit Cambridge. The latter attributes it ("Epistulae" 6:2) to Fisher's protection that the study of Greek was allowed to proceed at Cambridge without the active molestation that it encountered at Oxford.

Despite his fame and eloquence, it was not long before Fisher came into conflict with the new King, his former pupil. The dispute arose over funds left by the Lady Margaret, the King's grandmother, for financing foundations at Cambridge.

In 1512 Fisher was nominated as one of the English representatives at the Fifth Council of the Lateran, then sitting, but his journey to Rome was postponed, and finally abandoned.

=== Opposition to Lutheranism ===
John Fisher was "the first theologian to diagnose justification through faith alone as the founding dogma of the Protestant Reformation."

Fisher has also been named, though without any convincing proof, as the true author of the royal treatise against Martin Luther entitled "Assertio septem sacramentorum" (Defence of the Seven Sacraments), published in 1521, which won for King Henry VIII the title "Fidei Defensor" (Defender of the Faith). Prior to this date Fisher had denounced various abuses in the Church, urging the need for disciplinary reforms.

In 1523, Fisher published a 200,000 word response to Martin Luther's Latin: Assertio Omnium Articulor (Assertions): Latin: Assertionis Lutheranae Confutatio (Confutation of the Lutheran Assertions). Luther omitted some of the more provocative material from his German version, allowing the view that Fisher (and, the next year, Erasmus) had misunderstood Luther. Luther did not respond to Fisher.

On about 11 February 1526, at the King's command, he preached a famous sermon against Luther at St Paul's Cross, the open-air pulpit outside St Paul's Cathedral in London, as part of a spectacle in which some Lutherans publicly abjured their views and confiscated Lutheran books were burnt. In the preface to the printed English version of the sermon, Fisher offered to meet secretly with any Lutheran, "to hear the bottom of his mind, and he shall hear mine again, if it so please him: and I trust in our lord, that finally we shall so agree, that either he shall make me a Lutheran, or else I shall induce him to be a Catholic, and to follow the doctrine of Christ's church." The battle against heterodox teachings increasingly occupied Fisher's later years.

In 1529 Fisher was called to confirm with Thomas Hitton, a follower of William Tyndale arrested for suspected heresy, that the records of his interviews and forthright admissions to Archbishop William Warham were correct and to convince Hitton to abjure. Failing this, Hitton was handed to the secular authorities and executed at the stake for heresy. William Tyndale, then living overseas, claimed that Hitton had been tortured by the archbishops, however Protestant historian John Foxe who was diligent in passing on this kind of claim, does not claim this.

=== Defence of Catherine of Aragon ===
When Henry tried to annul his marriage to Catherine of Aragon, Fisher became the Queen's chief supporter. As such, he appeared on the Queen's behalf in the legates' court, where he startled the audience by the directness of his language and by declaring that, like St John the Baptist, he was ready to die on behalf of the indissolubility of marriage. Henry VIII, upon hearing this, grew so enraged by it that he composed a long Latin address to the legates in answer to the bishop's speech. Fisher's copy of this still exists, with his manuscript annotations in the margin which show how little he feared the royal anger. The removal of the cause to Rome brought Fisher's personal involvement to an end, but the King never forgave him for what he had done.

=== Henry's attack on church prerogatives ===
In November 1529, the "Long Parliament" of Henry's reign began encroaching on the Catholic Church's prerogatives. Fisher, as a member of the upper house, the House of Lords, at once warned Parliament that such acts could only end in the utter destruction of the Catholic Church in England. The Commons, through their speaker, complained to the King that Fisher had disparaged Parliament, presumably with Henry prompting them behind the scenes. Henry summoned Fisher before him, demanding an explanation. This being given, Henry declared himself satisfied, leaving it to the Commons to declare that the explanation was inadequate, so that he appeared as a magnanimous sovereign, instead of Fisher's enemy.

A year later, in 1530, the continued encroachments on the Church moved Fisher, as bishop of Rochester, along with the bishops of Bath and Ely, to appeal to the Holy See. This gave the King his opportunity and an edict forbidding such appeals was immediately issued, and the three bishops were arrested. Their imprisonment, however, must have lasted only a few months for in February 1531, Convocation met, and Fisher was present. This was the occasion when the clergy were forced, at a cost of 100,000 pounds, to purchase the King's pardon for having recognized Cardinal Wolsey's authority as legate of the pope; and at the same time to acknowledge Henry as supreme head of the Church in England, to which phrase the addition of the clause "so far as God's law permits" was made through Fisher's efforts.

This yere was a coke boylyd in a cauderne in Smythfeld for he wolde a powsyned the bishop of Rochester Fycher with dyvers of hys servanttes, and he was lockyd in a chayne and pullyd up and downe with a gybbyt at dyvers tymes tyll he was dede.

— Chronicle of the Grey Friars of London, 1531

==== Poisoned porridge and cannonball ====
A few days later, several of Fisher's household were taken ill after eating some porridge served to the household and two died: however Fisher was fasting that day. Henry VIII had parliament enact a retroactive bill that allowed the cook, Richard Roose, without a public trial, to be executed by the state by being boiled alive for the crime of poisoning.

On another occasion in 1530, a cannonball fired from across the Thames hit Fisher's house, narrowly missing his study. This was rumoured to be a warning or assassination attempt from the Boleyn family.

=== Intrigues with the Holy Roman Emperor ===
Fisher also engaged in secret activities to overthrow Henry. As early as 1531 he began secretly communicating with foreign diplomats. In September 1533 communicating secretly through the imperial ambassador Eustace Chapuys he encouraged Holy Roman Emperor Charles V to invade England and depose Henry in combination with a domestic uprising.

=== "The King's Great Matter" ===
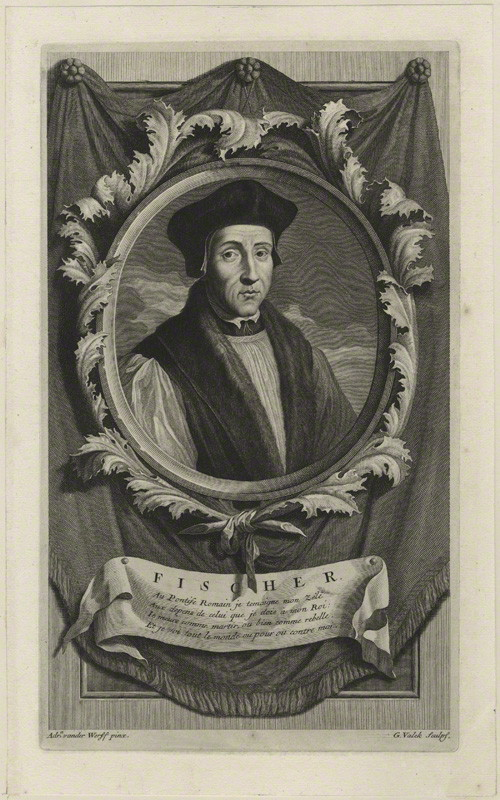
John Fisher by Gerard Valck, after Adriaen van der Werff, 1697.

Matters now moved rapidly. In May 1532, Sir Thomas More resigned the chancellorship and, in June, Fisher preached publicly against the annulment. In August, William Warham, Archbishop of Canterbury, died and Thomas Cranmer was at once proposed by Henry to the Pope as his successor. In January of the next year, Henry secretly went through a form of marriage with Anne Boleyn. Cranmer's consecration as a bishop took place in March 1533, and, a week later, Fisher was arrested. It seems that the purpose of this arrest was to prevent him from opposing the annulment which Cranmer pronounced in May, or the coronation of Anne Boleyn which followed on 1 June, for Fisher was set at liberty again within a fortnight of the latter event, no charge being made against him.

In the autumn of 1533, various arrests were made in connection with the so-called revelations of the Holy Maid of Kent, Elizabeth Barton, but as Fisher was taken seriously ill in December, proceedings against him were postponed for a time. However, in March 1534, a special Bill of Attainder against Fisher and others for complicity in the matter of the Maid of Kent was introduced in Parliament and passed. By this, Fisher was condemned to forfeit all his personal estate and to be imprisoned during the King's pleasure. Subsequently, a pardon was granted him on payment of a fine of 300 pounds.

=== Succession and supremacy ===
The same session of Parliament passed the First Succession Act, by which all who should be called upon to do so were compelled to take an oath of succession, acknowledging the issue of Henry and Anne as legitimate heirs to the throne, under pain of being guilty of misprision of treason. Fisher refused the oath and was imprisoned in the Tower of London on 26 April 1534. Several efforts were made to induce him to submit, but without effect, and in November he was attained of misprision of treason a second time, his goods being forfeited as from the previous 1 March, and the See of Rochester being declared vacant as of 2 June following. He was to remain in the Tower for over a year, and while he was allowed food and drink sent by friends, and a servant, he was not allowed a priest, even to the very end. A long letter exists, written from the Tower by Fisher to Thomas Cromwell, speaking of the severity of his conditions of imprisonment.

Like Thomas More, Bishop Fisher believed that, because the statute condemned only those speaking maliciously against the King's new title, there was safety in silence. However, on 7 May he fell into a trap laid for him by Richard Rich, who was to perjure himself to obtain Thomas More's conviction. Rich told Fisher that for his own conscience's sake the King wished to know, in strict secrecy, Fisher's real opinion. Fisher, once again, declared that the King was not Supreme Head of the Church of England.

=== Cardinalate and martyrdom ===
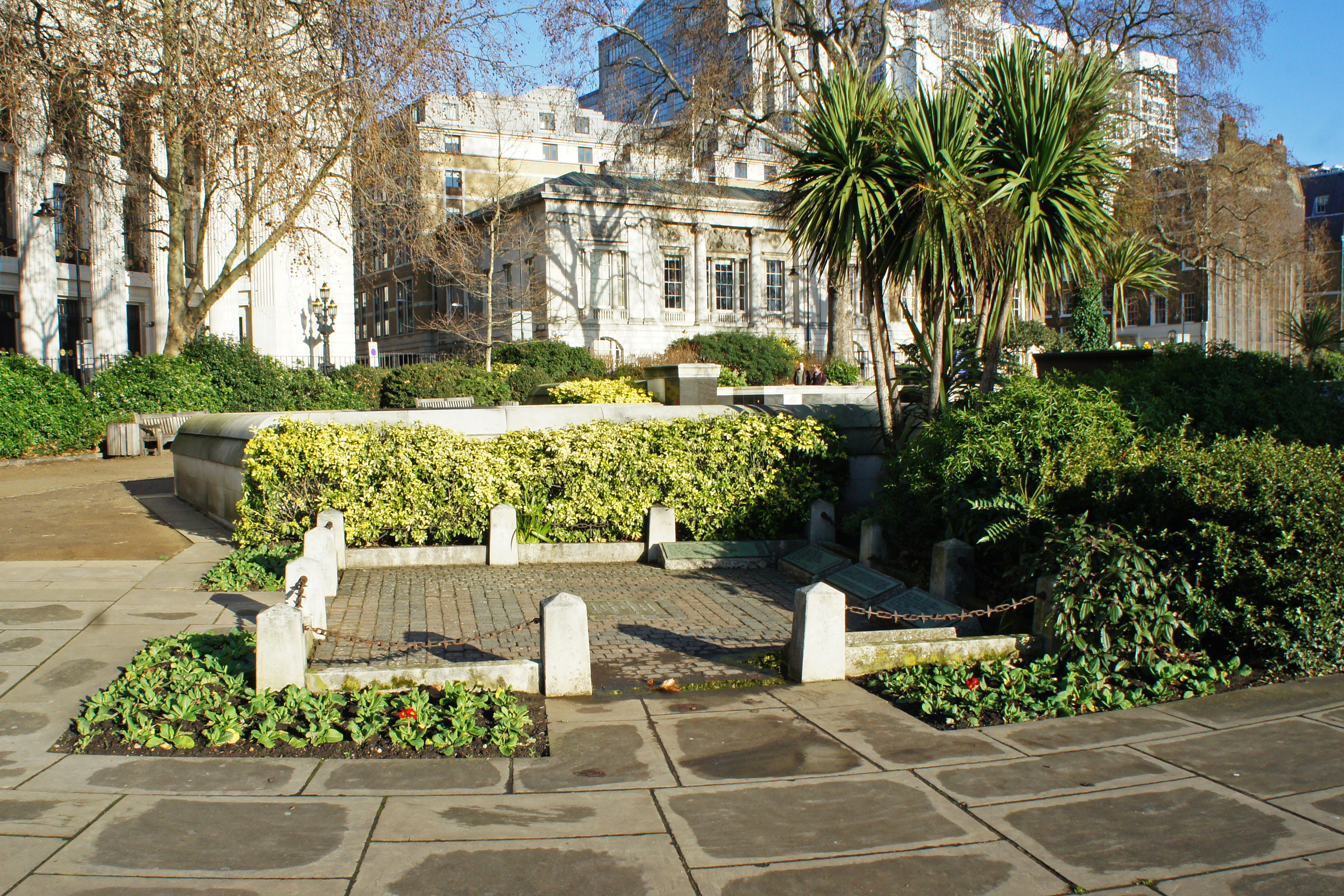
Memorial space at the Tower Hill public execution site

In May 1535, the newly elected Pope Paul III created Fisher Cardinal Priest of San Vitale, apparently in the hope of inducing Henry to ease Fisher's treatment. The effect was precisely the reverse: Henry forbade the cardinal's hat to be brought into England, declaring that he would send the head to Rome instead.

In June a special commission for Fisher's trial was issued, and on Thursday, 17 June, he was arraigned in Westminster Hall before a court of seventeen, including Thomas Cromwell, Anne Boleyn's father, and ten justices. The charge was treason, in that he denied that the King was the Supreme Head of the Church of England. Since he had been deprived of his position of Bishop of Rochester by the Act of Attainder, he was treated as a commoner, and tried by jury. The only testimony was that of Richard Rich. John Fisher was found guilty and condemned to be hanged, drawn and quartered at Tyburn.

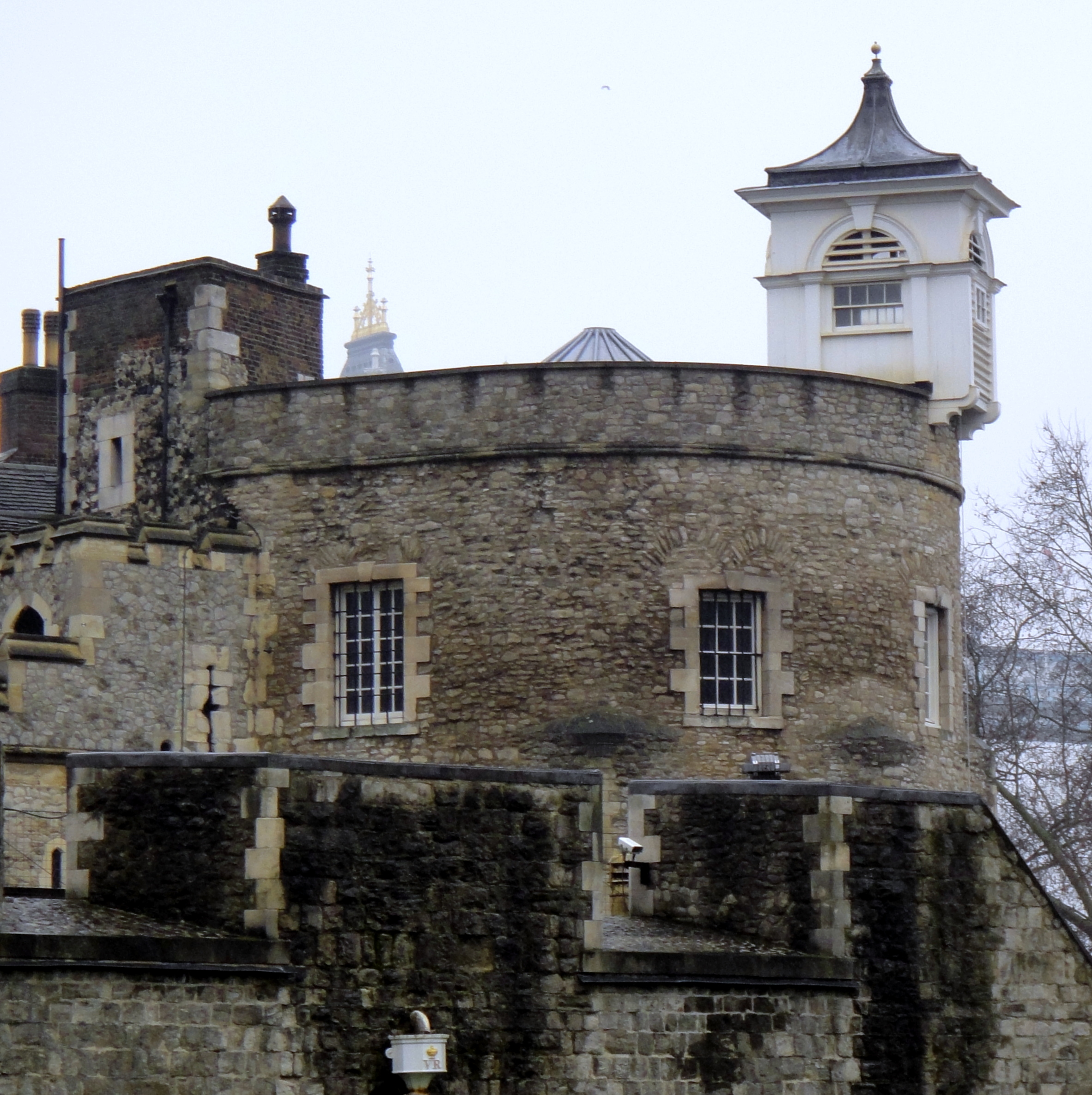
The Bell Tower, where John Fisher was held during his prison time together with Thomas More, though imprisoned separately therein.

However, a public outcry was brewing among the London populace who saw a sinister irony in the parallels between the conviction of Fisher and that of his patronal namesake, Saint John the Baptist, who was executed by King Herod Antipas for challenging the validity of Herod's marriage to his brother's divorcée Herodias. For fear of John Fisher's living through his patronal feast day, that of the Nativity of St. John the Baptist on 24 June, and of attracting too much public sympathy, the king commuted the sentence to that of beheading, to be accomplished before 23 June, the Vigil of the feast of the Nativity of St. John the Baptist.

He was executed on Tower Hill on 22 June 1535. The execution had the opposite effect from that which Henry VIII intended, as it created yet another parallel with that of the martyrdom of St. John the Baptist, who was also beheaded; his death also happened on the feast day of Saint Alban, the first martyr of Britain.

Fisher met death with a calm dignified courage which profoundly impressed those present. His body was treated with particular rancour, apparently on Henry's orders, being stripped and left on the scaffold until the evening, when it was taken on pikes and thrown naked into a rough grave in the churchyard of All Hallows' Barking, also known as All Hallows-by-the-Tower. There was no funeral prayer. A fortnight later, his body was laid beside that of Sir Thomas More in the chapel of St Peter ad Vincula within the Tower of London. Fisher's head was stuck upon a pole on London Bridge but its ruddy and lifelike appearance excited so much attention that, after a fortnight, it was thrown into the Thames, its place being taken by that of Sir Thomas More, whose execution, also at Tower Hill, occurred on 6 July.

"Catholic piety conventionally explains the scarlet robes that Cardinals wear as a sign of their readiness to shed their blood for the sake of the Christian gospel. This is an edifying thought: but as a matter of fact, in the whole millenium-long history of the cardinalate, only one member of the Sacred College has actually ever suffered martyrdom. That man was John Fisher. (...)

— Eamon Duffy

== Writings ==
A list of John Fisher's writings is found in Joseph Gillow's Bibliographical Dictionary of the English Catholics (London, s.d.), II, 262–270. There are twenty-six works in all, printed and manuscript, mostly ascetical or controversial treatises, several of which have been reprinted many times. The original editions are very rare and valuable. The principal are:

- Treatise concernynge ... the seven penytencyall Psalms (London, 1508)
- Sermon ... agayn ye pernicyous doctrin of Martin Luther (London, 1521)
- Assertionis Lutheranae Confutatio (Confutation of the Lutheran Assertions) (1523)
- Defensio Henrici VIII (Cologne, 1525)
- De Veritate Corporis et Sanguinis Christi in Eucharistia, adversus Johannem Oecolampadium (Cologne, 1527)
- De Causa Matrimonii ... Henrici VIII cum Catharina Aragonensi (Alcalá de Henares, 1530)
- The Wayes to Perfect Religion (London, 1535)
- A Spirituall Consolation written ... to hys sister Elizabeth (London, 1535)
- In a letter to Thomas Cromwell dated 22 December 1534, Fisher wrote "And this our Lord God send you a mery Christmas"—the earliest recorded use of the phrase "Merry Christmas".

== Legacy ==
=== Canonisation ===
Saint John Fisher Bishop of Rochester
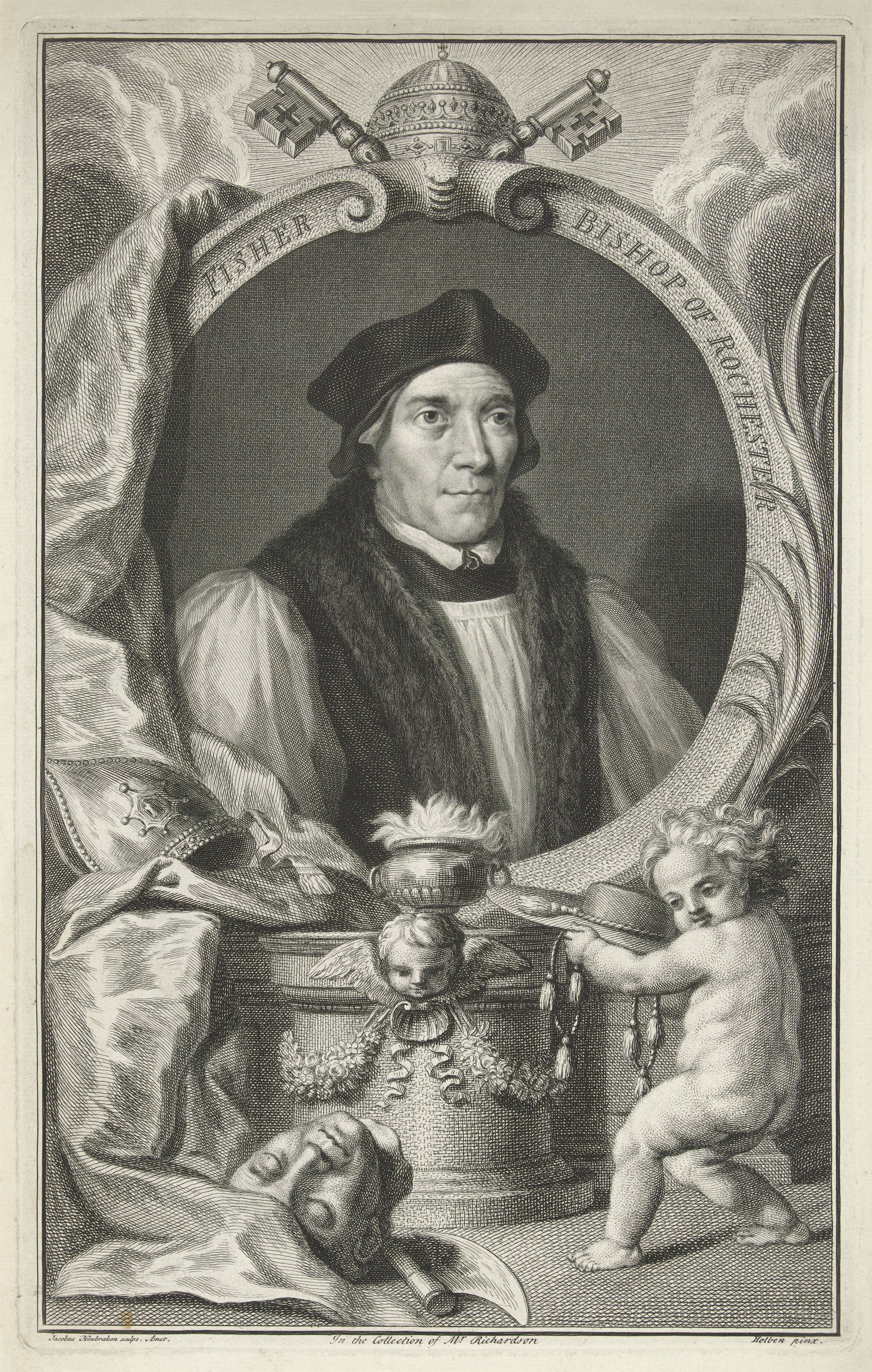

Bishop and Martyr
- Born: 19 October 1469; Beverley, Yorkshire, Kingdom of England
- Died: 22 June 1535 (aged 65); Tower Hill, Tower of London, London, Kingdom of England
- Venerated in: Catholic Church
- Beatified: 29 December 1886, Rome by Leo XIII
- Canonized: 19 May 1935, Vatican City by Pius XI
- Feast: 22 June

John Fisher was beatified by Pope Leo XIII with Thomas More and 52 other English Martyrs on 29 December 1886. In the Decree of Beatification, the greatest place was given to Fisher.

He was canonised, with Thomas More, on 19 May 1935 by Pope Pius XI, after the presentation of a petition by English Catholics. His feast day, for celebration jointly with Thomas More, is on 22 June (the date of Fisher's execution). In 1980, despite being an opponent of the English Reformation, Fisher was added to the Church of England's calendar of Saints and Heroes of the Christian Church, jointly with Thomas More, to be commemorated every 6 July (the date of More's execution) as "Thomas More, Scholar, and John Fisher, Bishop of Rochester, Reformation Martyrs, 1535". He is also listed along with Thomas More in the calendar of saints of some of the other Churches of the Anglican Communion, such as The Anglican Church of Australia.

=== Patronage ===
==== Australia ====
- St John Fisher College at the University of Tasmania in Hobart
- St John Fisher Catholic High school in Bracken Ridge, Queensland
- St John Fisher Church (Kurnell), Sydney, Australia
- St John Fisher Church (Tarragindi), Brisbane, Queensland

==== Canada ====
- St. John Fisher Catholic School, Scarborough
- Fisher Hall, one of the residence halls at Saint Michael's College at the University of Toronto
- St. John Fisher R.C. School, Forest, Ontario
- St. John Fisher Parish, Bramalea (Brampton), Ontario
- St. John Fisher Elementary School, Pointe-Claire, Quebec

==== United Kingdom ====
- The University of Cambridge:
  - Fisher House, the Cambridge University Catholic Chaplaincy.
  - Fisher Building, a student accommodation at Queens' College, where Fisher was president from 1505 to 1508
  - The Fisher Building, conference centre and meeting rooms in St John's College
- Schools:
  - St John Fisher Catholic College in Newcastle-under-Lyme, Staffordshire
  - St John Fisher Catholic High School in Harrogate, North Yorkshire
  - St John Fisher Catholic High School in Peterborough, Cambridgeshire.
  - St John Fisher Catholic High School, Wigan, Lancashire
  - St John Fisher Catholic School in Chatham, Kent.
  - St John Fisher Catholic Voluntary Academy in Dewsbury, West Yorkshire
  - Ss John Fisher and Thomas More Roman Catholic High School, Colne, Lancashire
  - The John Fisher School located in Purley, London, Surrey
- St John Fisher Catholic Primary School, Loughton, Essex
- St John Fisher Catholic Primary School, Pinner
- Churches:
  - Saint John Fisher parish, Kidbrooke, London
  - Saint John Fisher Roman Catholic Church, Merton, London
  - Saint John Fisher Roman Catholic Church, Harrow, London
  - Saint John Fisher Roman Catholic Church, Shepperton, London
  - Saint John Fisher Roman Catholic Church, Rochester, Kent
  - John Fisher R.C. Church, Scarthoe, Great Grimsby, Lincolnshire. (Closed 2017)
  - Saint John Fisher R.C. Church, Priory Crescent, Southend on Sea, Essex
  - Saint John Fisher Church, Cambourne, Cambridgeshire
  - Saints John Fisher and Thomas More R.C. Church, Feckenham, Worcestershire
- Other:
  - St John Fisher House, Reading – the headquarters of the FSSP in England and Wales.
  - The football teams Fisher Athletic F.C. (1908–2009) and Fisher F.C. (founded 2009) of Rotherhithe, south-east London

==== United States ====
- Fisher is the patron of the Roman Catholic Diocese of Rochester in New York State, so named by Pope John XXIII in 1961.
- Due to his status as the Bishop of Rochester, Fisher has been adopted as a patron of several institutions in other cities named Rochester, including:
  - St. John Fisher Catholic Church near Rochester, Michigan
  - St. John Fisher University in Rochester, New York
  - St. John of Rochester Catholic Church near Rochester, New York
- A number of other parishes are also dedicated to St. John Fisher, including those in:
  - Rancho Palos Verdes, California
  - Marlborough, Connecticut
  - Chicago, Illinois
  - Newtown, Ohio
  - Tulsa, Oklahoma
  - Portland, Oregon
  - Boothwyn, Pennsylvania
  - Churchill, Pennsylvania
  - Galveston, Texas
- And the St. John Fisher Seminary Residence in the Catholic Diocese of Bridgeport, Connecticut.

== Personal ==
=== Portraits ===
Several portraits of John Fisher exist, the most prominent being by Hans Holbein the Younger in the Royal Collection; and a few secondary relics are extant.

=== Relic ===
Fisher's walking-staff is in the possession of the Eyston family of East Hendred, in Oxfordshire (formerly Berkshire).

=== Cinematic and television portrayals ===
John Fisher was portrayed by veteran actor Joseph O'Conor in the film Anne of the Thousand Days (1969), by Bosco Hogan in the series The Tudors, by Geoffrey Lewis in the 1971 miniseries The Six Wives of Henry VIII and by Richard Durden in the 2015 miniseries Wolf Hall.

Catholic Church titles
Preceded by Richard FitzJames	Bishop of Rochester; 1504–1535	Succeeded by John Hilsey
Academic offices
Preceded by Henry Babington	Vice-Chancellors of the University of Cambridge; 1501	Succeeded by Humphrey Fitzwilliam
Preceded by Thomas Wilkynson	President of Queens' College, Cambridge; 1505–1508	Succeeded by Robert Bekensaw
