= Maria Dowling =

British historian

Maria Dowling (1955–2011) was a historian. She was a senior lecturer in history at St Mary’s University College, Twickenham, England. Her best-known work is arguably Humanism in the Age of Henry VIII.
