= Senator Melton =

Senator Melton may refer to:

- Eddie Melton (born c. 1980), Indiana State Senate
- Emory Melton (1923–2015), Missouri State Senate

== See also ==
- Senator Milton (disambiguation)
