= William Melton (priest) =

William Melton (died 1528) was an English priest who held the position of chancellor of York Minster.

== Life ==
Melton was born in Yorkshire, and was educated at Cambridge, where he graduated M.A. 1479, B.D. 1490, and D.D. 1496. From 1485 to 1495 he was a Fellow of Michaelhouse, Cambridge.

On 13 January 1496 Melton became chancellor of the church of York. He died at the end of 1528, and his will is dated 28 August of that year, from Acklam, Yorkshire. He is supposed to have been buried either there or in York minster. He was famed as a philosopher, divine, and preacher.

Melton was author of a Sermo Exhortatorius, published by Wynkyn de Worde in 1494.

== Influence ==
At Cambridge Melton was the tutor of his fellow Yorkshireman John Fisher. He was a significant figure in the Cambridge reforming humanist group, including also John Colet, Ralph Collingwood and John Constable.

"William Melton seems to have exerted a strong influence. And Melton emerges from present research not only as a pastorally minded churchman but as representative of openness to humanistic scholarship at Cambridge unsuspected hitherto."

"If Fisher’s encouragement of learning at Cambridge relied mainly on the Lady Margaret’s material resources, intellectually he owed a great deal to his master, William Melton of Michaelhouse, where Fisher became a fellow in 1491. His formative influence is alluded to by Fisher in the preface of his De Veritate Corporis. The context of the tribute paid there to Melton is important for understanding Fisher’s attitude towards scholarship in general. Melton, he says, instilled in him as a young student the need to be attentive to every detail… (…) Throughout his life this attention to detail characterised Fisher’s scholarship and educational ideals. (…) Like Fisher, Melton combined by the time of his death the old scholastic learning with an acquaintance with new authors and with the Church fathers."
