= Cromwell Lee =

- Died: 1601; Oxford
- Spouse: Mary Harcourt
- Issue: Robert Lee (illegitimate); John Lee (illegitimate)
- Father: Sir Anthony Lee
- Mother: Margaret Wyatt

Cromwell Lee (died 1601) was the son of Sir Anthony Lee, and a younger brother of Elizabeth I's champion, Sir Henry Lee. He was the compiler of an Italian-English dictionary.

== Family ==
Cromwell Lee was the youngest son of Sir Anthony Lee and Margaret Wyatt, sister of the poet Sir Thomas Wyatt. He had three brothers and five sisters. He also had two illegitimate half-brothers who were born before his father's second marriage to their mother, Anne Hassall. For details concerning his siblings, see the article on his father, Sir Anthony Lee.

== Career ==
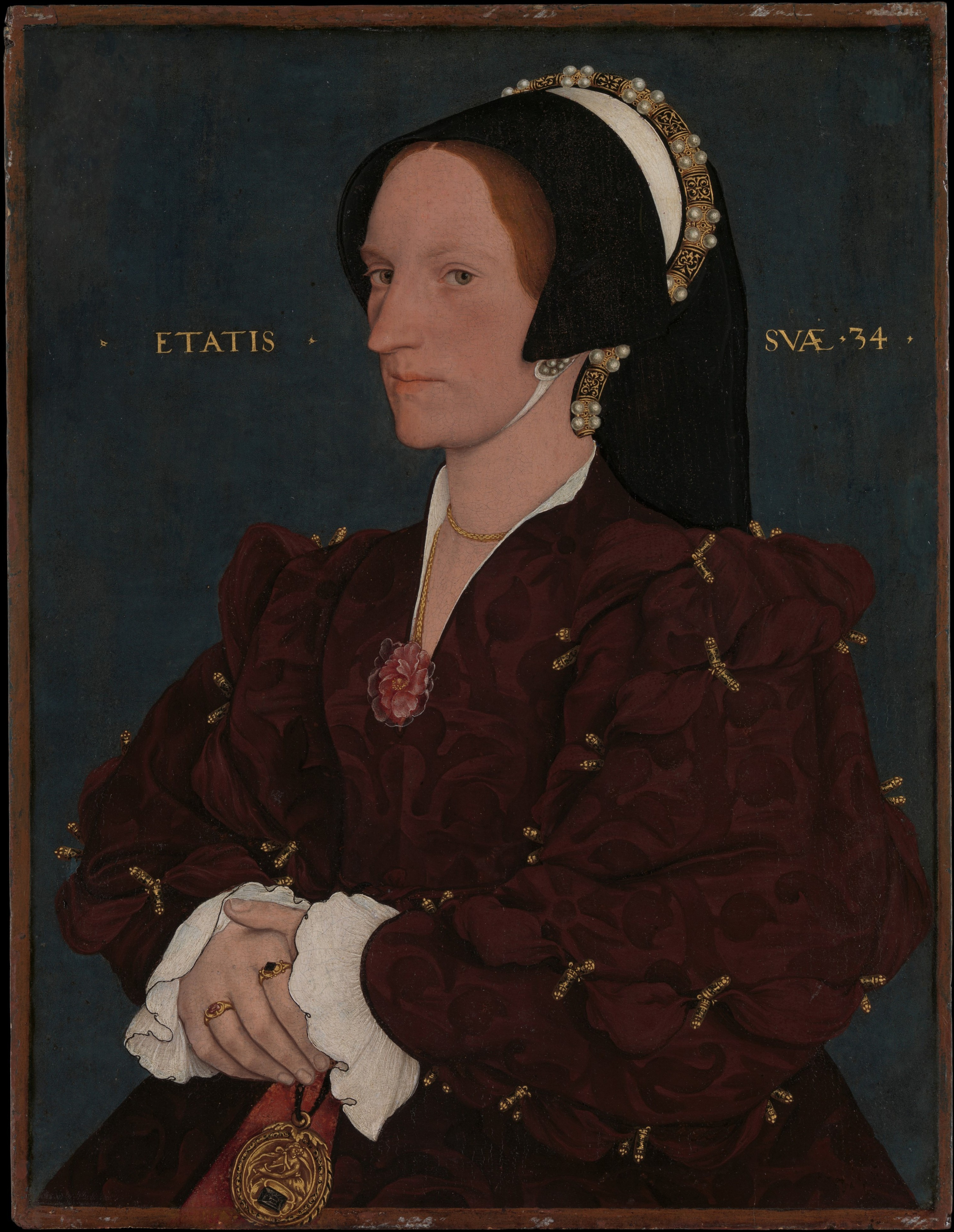
Cromwell Lee's mother, Margaret Wyatt, by Hans Holbein

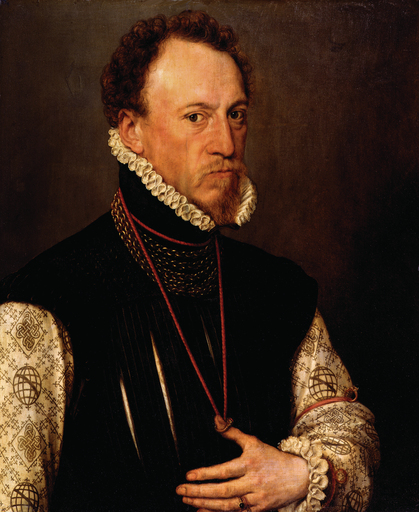
Cromwell Lee's eldest brother, Sir Henry Lee, by Anthonis Mor

His father is thought to have been in the service of Thomas Cromwell by 1532, and had an active career at court and in local government in Buckinghamshire. His eldest brother, Sir Henry Lee, was a prominent courtier and Elizabeth I's champion. In about 1572 Cromwell Lee matriculated at St John's College, Oxford, but left without taking a degree. He travelled in Italy for some years.

He appears to have been close to his eldest brother, Sir Henry Lee, and to his illegitimate half-brother, Sir Richard Lee. Through his first marriage to Mary Blundell, Sir Richard Lee held leases of two manors in Hook Norton which became the subject of subsequent litigation with John Croker, Mary Blundell's son by her first marriage. Pleadings from 1587 reveal that Sir Richard Lee had sublet these leases to his half-brother, Cromwell, who resided on the Hook Norton property with his family. The controversy over the leases is briefly mentioned in Leicester's Commonwealth (1584), where the author refers to the Earl of Leicester's oppressive 'dealing with Master Richard Lee for his manor of Hook Norton (if I fail not in the name)'.

In addition to the leases at Hook Norton, Cromwell Lee had property at Cutteslowe in Oxfordshire, and served as a Justice of the Peace, 'of no very good repute' for that county. However he resided principally in Oxford itself, where in 1590 he was granted licence by the Vice-Chancellor of the University to eat meat in Lent. According to Chambers, 'more than one Oxford epigram describes his morals in the grossest terms'.

On 23 September 1590 Sir Henry Lee was commissioned to investigate the murder of one Nicholas Crane, and his brother Cromwell was joined with him in the investigation, together with William Spencer of Yarnton, and Walter Culpepper of Kent.

In 1599 Sir Henry Lee purchased the tenancy in chief of the manor of Spelsbury, held of the crown, in Cromwell Lee's name, taking a bond from Cromwell which allowed Sir Henry enjoyment of the manor during Cromwell's lifetime and the reversionary interest at Cromwell's death. In 1600 Sir Henry Lee transferred to Cromwell his interest in the advowson of Charlbury.

Sir Henry was convalescing at Woodstock when he heard news of the Earl of Essex's rebellion in February 1601. According to Chambers, 'his first impulse was to repair to London with his brother Cromwell, but a relapse held him'. Whether Cromwell Lee went to London on his own at the time is not known.

Cromwell Lee compiled part of an Italian–English dictionary, completing it up to the word tralignato. He gave the work to the library of St John's College, Oxford, 'where a fair copy of it, transcribed by Thomas Potticary, M.A. of that College, yet remains'. Although unfinished, it is said to have been 'as big as a church bible'.

He died in December 1601, while resident in the parish of St Cross Holywell, Oxford. His eldest brother, Sir Henry, was his heir at law, and in his own will dated 6 October 1609 directed that tombs be set up for his brother, Cromwell, and other family members. It seems, however, that this was never done. An epitaph, attributed to 'a humorous student' of Oxford, stated that at his death Cromwell Lee 'gave nothing to the poor/But half to his bastards and half to his whore'.

His portrait, attributed to Marcus Gheeraerts the Younger, was included in an exhibition at Oxford in 1904; however, its present whereabouts are unknown.

== Marriage ==
In 1575 he married Mary Harcourt, widow of Richard Taverner (d.1575) of Woodeaton, Clerk of the Signet to Edward VI. She was one of the eight daughters of Sir John Harcourt (d. 19 February 1566) of Stanton Harcourt by Margaret Barentyne, and by her first marriage to Richard Taverner, she was the great-grandmother of Anthony Wood. There appear to have been no children from the marriage.

The family of Lees of Barna, County Tipperary, claimed descent from Cromwell Lee, and according to Chambers this may have been through an illegitimate son, Robert Lee of New Woodstock, son of Cromwell's servant, Joan Hopkins alias Hatton. In his will he left Joan some kine and household goods at Cutteslowe, her daughter Alice a marriage portion of £10, and Robert his household furniture and his leases from Merton College. He made Joan and Robert his residuary legatees. She later married one Thomas Aylwin or Ayleward of Eversley, a witness to the will.

He is also reputed to have been the father of John Lee (d.1609) who was a Fellow of St John's College, Oxford, and graduated MA in 1591. John Lee's mother was named Anne, and he had a brother, Francis Lee, as well as a sister married to a husband surnamed Tote. As Chambers notes, there was a family connection, as John Lee held the livings of Fleet Marston and Wootton, but he could not have been a legitimate son 'or Sir Henry Lee would not have been Cromwell's heir at law'.
