= Anthony Lee (politician) =

English courtier and Member of Parliament

Sir Anthony Lee
- Born: c.1510
- Died: 24 November 1549 (aged 38–39)
- Spouses: Margaret Wyatt; Anne Hassall
- Issue: Sir Henry Lee; Robert Lee; Thomas Lee; Cromwell Lee; Anne Lee; Lettice Lee; Katherine Lee; Joyce Lee; Jane Lee
- Father: Sir Robert Lee
- Mother: Joan Cope

Sir Anthony Lee (c. 1510 – 24 November 1549) was an English courtier and Member of Parliament, and the father of Elizabeth I's champion, Sir Henry Lee. He was at the court of Henry VIII in his youth, and served as a Justice of the Peace and Knight of the Shire for Buckinghamshire. He was a close friend of his brother-in-law, the poet Sir Thomas Wyatt.

== Family ==
Anthony Lee was a great-grandson of Bennet Lee of Cheshire, who had established the Lee family at Quarrendon in Buckinghamshire. Born about 1510, Anthony was the eldest son of Sir Robert Lee (d. 1539) by his first wife, Joan Cope, daughter of William Cope of Banbury by Joan Spencer, one of the daughters of John Spencer, esquire, of Hodnell, Warwickshire. Anthony had a brother, Francis Lee, about whom little in known, and a sister, Jane Lee, who is said to have married William Symonds of Cornwall.

Lee's mother died before 12 July 1521, the date on which his father settled property at Burston on his second wife, Lettice Peniston, widow of Sir Robert Knollys, and daughter of Thomas Peniston of Hawridge, Buckinghamshire. By his second wife Sir Robert Lee had a son and two daughters:

- Benedict Lee (d. February 1559), who married Margaret Pakington, the daughter of Robert Pakington, by whom he had a son, Captain Thomas Lee, 'the traitor', executed at Tyburn on 17 February 1601 after the Earl of Essex's rebellion. Captain Thomas Lee's son, Henry Lee (d. 9 October 1657) of Kildare, was the heir at law of Sir Anthony Lee's eldest son, Sir Henry Lee (see below). Benedict Lee was a henchman to Henry VIII, and served as such at the funeral of Jane Seymour. He was a partisan of Mary I, and his 'furious zeal' for her cause was rewarded with the grant of a manor. After his death his widow married Thomas Scott of Yorkshire.
- Elizabeth Lee, who married firstly William Tresham, and secondly Walter Vachell of Coley, Berkshire.
- Margaret Lee, who married a husband named Lane (perhaps Thomas Lane of Matson, Gloucestershire).

== Career ==
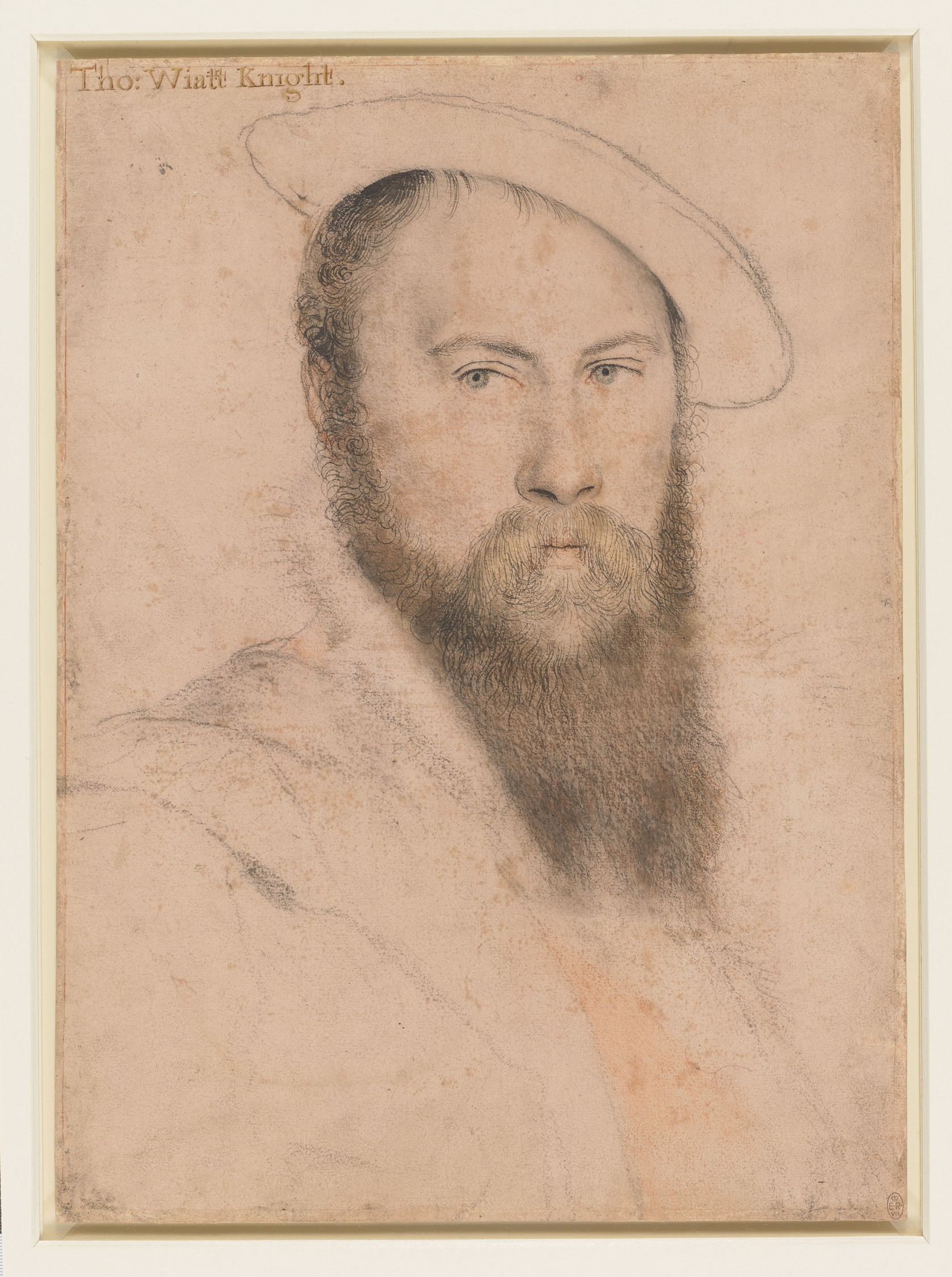
Sir Anthony Lee's brother-in-law and friend, the poet Sir Thomas Wyatt

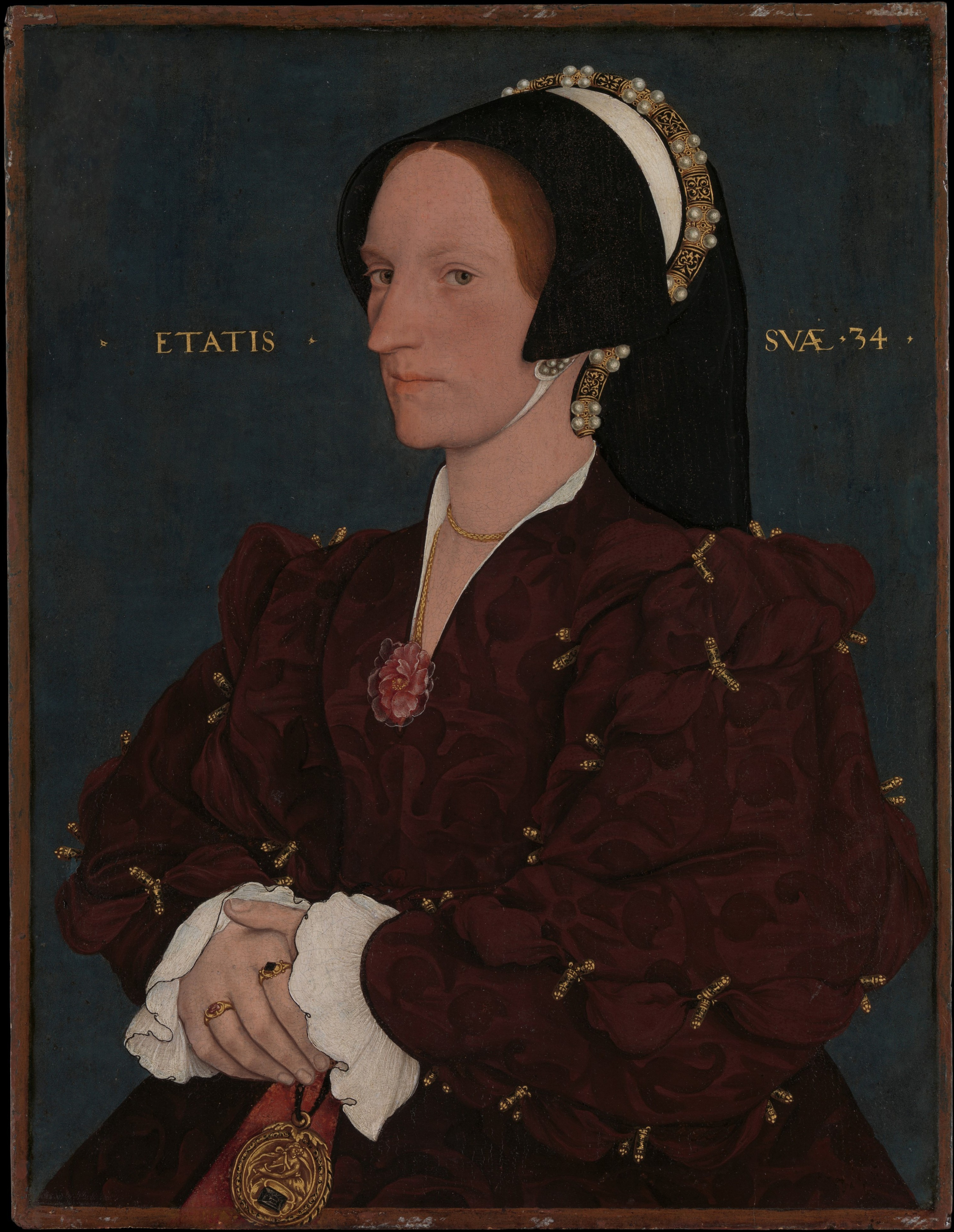
Sir Anthony Lee's first wife, Margaret Wyatt, by Hans Holbein

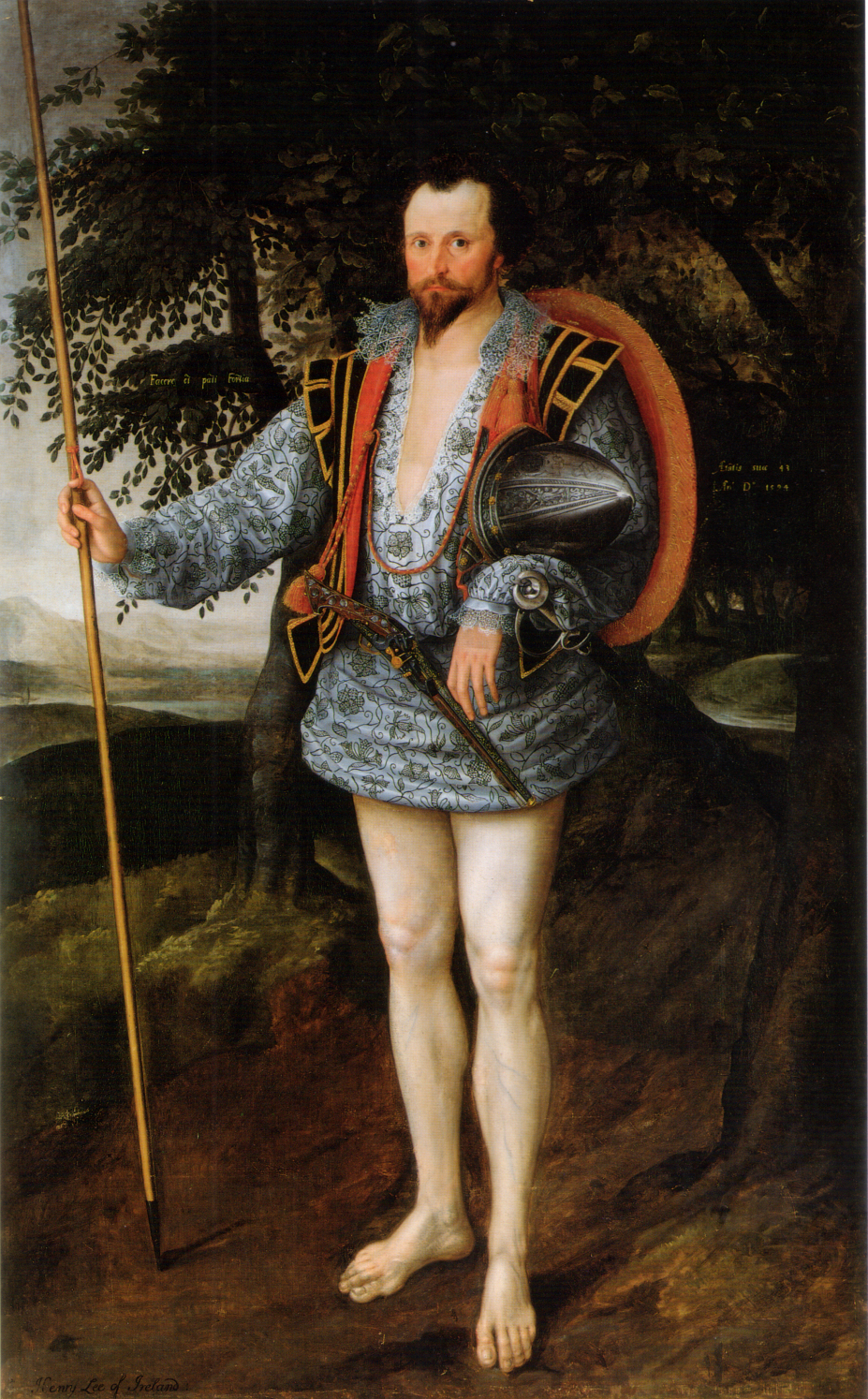
Sir Anthony Lee's half-nephew, Captain Thomas Lee, by Marcus Gheeraerts the Younger

Lee is thought to have come to Henry VIII's court in his youth. By 1531 he had married Margaret Wyatt. He appears to have been close to her brother, the poet Sir Thomas Wyatt, who spoke of the infinite favours Lee had done him, such that it made Wyatt 'weary to think on them'.

By 1532 he is known to have had lodgings at Westminster, at Petty Calais, and may have been in the household of Thomas Cromwell. In early 1536 he was brought to Hampton Court by Sir John Russell to answer for 'consenting to the theft of some of the King's hawks', but appears to have been restored to favour by October of that year, at which time he and one of Cromwell's servants were in attendance on 'Richard Cromwell alias Williams' in Lincolnshire.

Lee's father died 23 February 1539, and in that year Lee was appointed Justice of the Peace, was knighted, and was among those appointed to receive Henry VIII's bride, Anne of Cleves. He and his stepmother, Lettice, quarrelled over his father's will, and Cromwell was petitioned to act on her behalf. In the years 1540 and 1541 Lee's title to Quarrendon was challenged, and the matter was referred by the Privy Council to the Lord Chancellor, Thomas Audley.

In 1542 and again in 1547 he was elected to Parliament as Knight of the Shire for Buckinghamshire; however no details of his activity in Parliament survive. In 1544 he was among knights named to serve in the rearguard of the army sent by Henry VIII to France, and two years later he and Richard Greenway were jointly charged with mustering 300 men from Buckinghamshire. In 1546 he purchased lands from John Croke for £775.

On 24 January 1549 he was licensed to be absent from Parliament because of illness. He was nominated as Sheriff on 12 November 1549, and died less than two weeks later, on 24 November. In his will, dated 10 July 1549, he divided his properties among his four sons, all of whom were underage. His four unmarried daughters were given £200 apiece as marriage portions. His second wife, Anne, was given plate and other household goods, as well as a large flock of sheep, with the proviso that if Anne were to remarry the plate and goods would go to Richard Lee alias Hassall and Russell Lee alias Hassall, the two illegitimate sons born before their marriage. His will was proved 17 October 1550 by one of his executors, Sir William Paget.

None of Sir Anthony Lee's four legitimate sons left legitimate issue, and the heir at law of his eldest son, Sir Henry Lee, was thus Henry Lee (d. 9 October 1657) of Kildare, son of Sir Henry's Lee's half-cousin, Captain Thomas Lee, 'the traitor', executed at Tyburn on 17 February 1601 after the Earl of Essex's rebellion. However Sir Henry Lee contrived to leave his estates, not to his heir at law, but to a nephew described thus by George Blundell in a letter to Sir Ralph Winwood on 19 February 1611:

Sir Henry Lee is dead, and hath left Sir Robert Lee's son of the Forest, with one eye, his heir, and all his lands and goods but £600 a year to Mrs Banaster [sic for 'Vavasour'] during her life and no further, and she must put in bands to leave the houses and goods she hath at her death as good as now they are.

== Marriages and issue ==
Lee married firstly Margaret Wyatt, sister of the poet Sir Thomas Wyatt, and daughter of Sir Henry Wyatt of Allington Castle, Kent by Anne Skinner, the daughter of John Skinner of Reigate, Surrey, by whom he had four sons and five daughters:

- Sir Henry Lee, of Ditchley, a prominent courtier and Elizabeth I's champion. He married, on 21 May 1554, Anne Paget (d.1590), the daughter of William Paget, 1st Baron Paget, by whom he had two sons who died young, and a daughter who died without issue. After his wife's death, he openly lived with his mistress, Anne Vavasour, formerly one of the Queen's Ladies in Waiting.
- Robert Lee (died c.1598) of Hatfield near Doncaster, Yorkshire, who married Jane Restwold, widow of Sir Francis Hastings of Fenwick, and daughter of Edward Restwold of The Vache, Buckinghamshire. He served against the Spanish Armada. He was termed 'a notable adulterer' and 'a very bad man', and adjudged not fit to be a Justice of the Peace by Archbishop Edwin Sandys, but was nonetheless still serving as a Justice in 1588. He had an illegitimate son, Henry Lee alias Waring.
- Thomas Lee of Weedon, who died intestate in 1573, and whose estate was administered by his brother, Sir Henry.
- Cromwell Lee (d.1601), who married Mary Harcourt, one of the eight daughters of Sir John Harcourt (d. 19 February 1566) of Stanton Harcourt. He compiled part of an Italian-English dictionary.
- Anne Lee, who married Leonard Spenser of Naunton Hall in Rendlesham, Suffolk.
- Lettice Lee, who married Nicholas Cooke of Linstead, Suffolk.
- Katherine Lee, who married Gyles Symonds (died circa 1596) of Cley next the Sea, Norfolk.
- Joyce Lee, who married, on 29 November 1562, John Cheyne, son of Sir Robert Cheyne of Chesham Bois, Buckinghamshire.
- Jane Lee, who married Peter Reade of Gimingham, Norfolk.

He married secondly, by settlement dated 23 May 1548, Anne Hassall, the daughter of Richard Hassall of Hankelow, Cheshire, by whom he had two illegitimate sons born before the marriage:

- Sir Richard Lee (d. 22 December 1608).
- Russell Lee (d.1569).
