= Tibbot MacWalter Kittagh Bourke =

Irish-Spanish chieftain (c. 1570 – 1604)

Tibbot MacWalter Kittagh Bourke Tiobóid mac Ualtar Ciotach de Búrca

21st Chief of Mac William Íochtar
- Reign: 1595–1602 (disputed reign)
- Predecessor: William An tAb Caoch Bourke
- Successor: Richard Bourke (d. 1601); Title Abolished
- Born: c. 1570; Ardnaree, County Mayo, Ireland
- Died: 1604 (aged around 34); Crown of Castile
- Burial: November 1604; Convent of St. Francis, Valladolid
- Consort: identity unknown
- Issue: Walter Bourke; Meyler Bourke (d. 1595); John Burke (?)
- House: House of Burgh
- Father: Walter Kittagh Bourke
- Mother: Mary O'Donnell
- Religion: Roman Catholic

Tibbot MacWalter (Theobald Fitzwalter) Kittagh Bourke (Irish: Tiobóid mac Ualtar Ciotach de Búrca) (English: /bɜːrk/; BURK; c. 1570 – 1604) was the 21st and final Mac William Íochtar and was created 1st Marquess of Mayo in Spanish nobility.

Bourke was inaugurated in Kilmaine by Hugh Roe O'Donnell in December 1595 during the Nine Years' War to consolidate control of Mayo for the Irish confederacy. His tenure faced strong opposition from many Bourke nobles, especially his main rival, the loyalist chief Tibbot na Long Bourke. The struggle for dominance over the MacWilliam Lordship, which corresponds to modern-day County Mayo, was intense and the control of the region frequently changed hands. After fleeing to Spain in 1602 and being created Marquess of Mayo, Kittagh's departure marked the end of the MacWilliam chieftainship. Subsequently, Tibbot na Long was appointed Viscount Mayo.

== Family ==
Born in Ardnaree, near modern-day Ballina, County Mayo, Tiobóid was the eldest child of Walter Kittagh Bourke (died 1591), the High Sheriff of Sligo, and eldest but illegitimate son of Seaán mac Oliver Bourke (Sir John Bourke), 17th Mac William Íochtar and first Baron Ardenerie (d.1580). His mother was Mary O'Donnell, a seemingly distant relation to the Lord of Tyrconnell. Kittagh had four brothers – Thomas (d. 1597), Richard (d. 1589), Meyler and Walter, as well as four sisters – Mary, Cecilia, Sabina and the youngest sister whose name is unknown. The second youngest sister, Sabina, would marry the chief of Mac Sweeney Banagh.

While it is known that Kittagh was married, the identity of his wife and family is largely unknown. He had at least two children, Walter and Meyler. It is also suspected that John Burke, who was made commander of the Connacht forces during the Irish Confederate Wars in 1642, was also a son of Kittagh's, having been born in County Mayo yet spending "30 years in the service of Spain". John would have been about 10 at the time of Kittagh's journey to Spain.

== Early life, arrest and exile ==
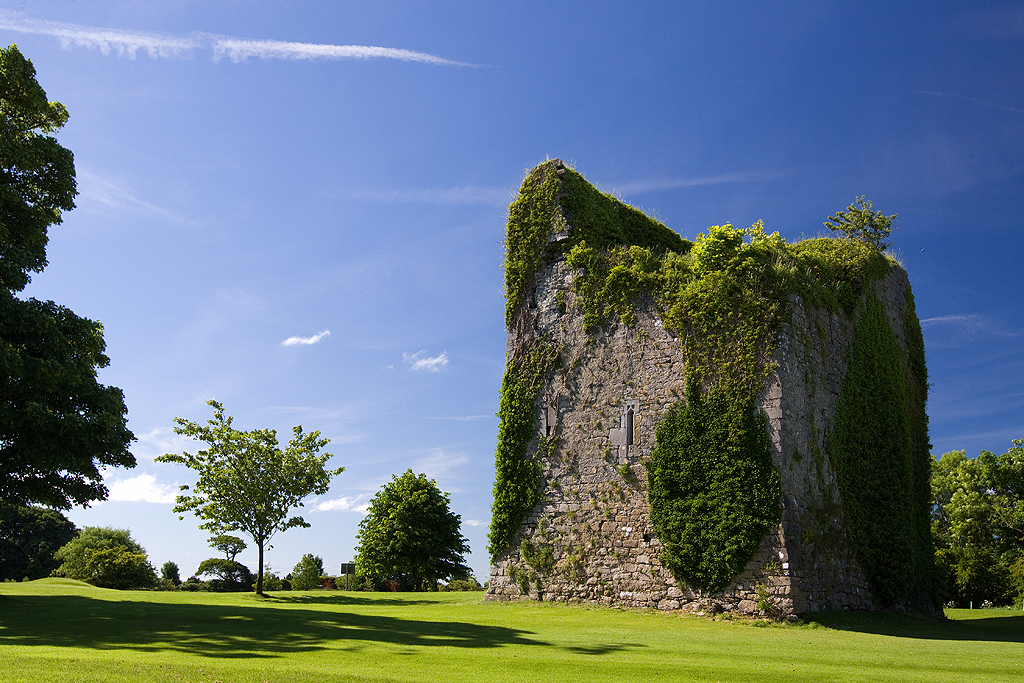
Cloonagashel Castle, Ballinrobe

Kittagh first appears in historical records following his father Walter's involvement in the MacWilliam rebellion of the 1580s against the Composition of Connacht. This was an English policy under which Risdeárd Bourke was recognized as the rightful lord of the MacWilliam territories, making his eldest son the automatic heir. This policy threatened the lands and inheritance rights of other local nobles, including Walter Kittagh. Walter made peace with the English in late 1590, securing his lands, but died shortly thereafter, leaving Tibbot in charge of his estate.

Despite having no role in the rebellion, Kittagh soon faced legal challenges from his influential uncles, Edmund and Richard. In response, the Lord Deputy issued a general pardon on 20 February 1593, for all in County Mayo, excluding Kittagh and three others. Governor Bingham later secured a pardon for Kittagh, which required validation at a court session later that year. Anticipating that his uncles would target him at this session in Mayo, Kittagh fled to the Pale but was arrested in Athlone.

While imprisoned in Athlone, Governor Bingham sought a new pardon for Kittagh and arranged for his wife to visit him. Allegedly, she smuggled him a file, enabling his escape with several other prisoners on 28 September. Fleeing to Tyrconnell, Kittagh sought protection from Hugh Roe O'Donnell, with whom he would form a close friendship and alliance. Following his escape, Kittagh was declared an outlaw, his castles at Cloonagashel, Castlebar, and Belleek were seized, and small English garrisons were stationed in them.

== Nine Years' War ==
=== Rebellion in Connacht and return ===
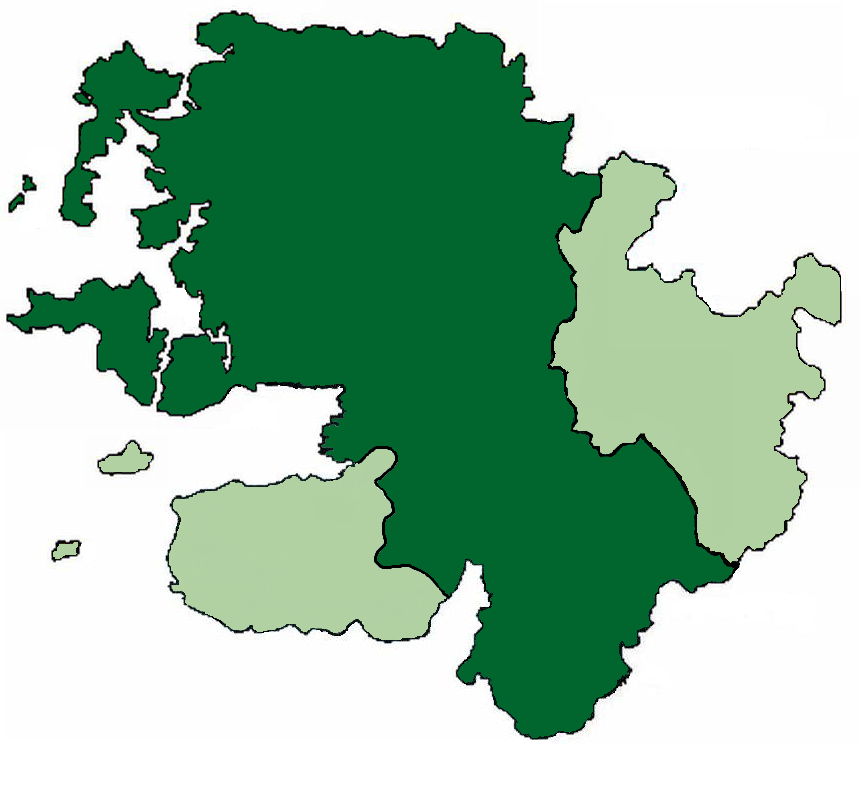
Extend of the Mac William Iochtar Territory within County Mayo, c. 1590

In the early stages of the Nine Years' War from 1593 to 1595 the nobles of Connacht were largely sympathetic to the cause of the Ulster lords O'Donnell and O'Neill, and detested the presence of the Binghams (Richard and his brothers George and John) in their province. Most had risen up in rebellion against the Presidency by 1595 and the government in Dublin were forced to step in. While O'Donnell and the Connachtmen had strategically battled the English and had taken control of castles across the province, the government initially floundered in the face of the rebels.

Many of the soldiers brought in from England fell ill due to the damp conditions. The veteran soldiers who were already there were not given enough supplies and ammunition to retake lost territory, or even engage the rebels at all in most cases, and the new arrivals were so unskilled in the use of their weapons that their captains were forced to give them to the Irish shots in their pay. Kittagh had returned by August 1595 and was besieging Belleek castle, one of his former possessions. Captain Fowle was sent to relieve it and set out on 3 October but was killed en route. When the remainder of his party arrived they found that the castle had already been surrendered.

Sir Geoffrey Fenton temporarily relieved Bingham of his command and asked the Connacht rebels to meet him in Galway to agree a peace. On O'Donnell's recommendation, they refused to meet Fenton at Galway and instead insisted that the meeting be held at Moyne. They had drawn up a book of complaints and demanded only the removal of the Binghams and their officers. However, in separate negotiations, O'Donnell told the government that there would be no peace until Ballymote and all of Sligo were handed over to his kingdom.

=== Inauguration ===
In the late 1590s, the clans of Mayo were eager to reinstate the MacWilliam chieftainship, previously abolished by Perrot and Bingham. O'Donnell dedicated months in 1595 to rally Mayo's nobles for a traditional inauguration ceremony. On 24 December, they gathered in Kilmaine, where prominent clans such as the MacJordan, MacCostello, MacMaurice, O'Malley, MacDonnell, and others convened. The contest for the title was intense, with nine members of the Bourke family vying for leadership, including notable figures like Kittagh, Tibbot na Long Bourke, and Richard "the Devil's Hook" Bourke.

Unbeknownst to the attendees, the outcome was predetermined. Flaunting his power, O'Donnell entered with a dramatic flair, backed by 1,800 soldiers, including his allies MacSweeney and O'Doherty, each commanding their own forces. They strategically positioned troops in four concentric rings around the rath, with O'Donnell and his chiefs at the core, controlling access strictly. Despite the diverse opinions, William Bourke of Shrule emerged as a favorite due to his seniority and experience. In contrast, Kittagh, the youngest and least popular, garnered support only from the MacJordan and MacCostello chiefs, who praised his relentless energy.

Ultimately, in a highly untraditional and heavily guarded assembly, O'Donnell publicly endorsed Kittagh, anointing him with the MacWilliam title, to the surprise of many. This decision led to the capture of three rivals and the securing of hostages from the remaining contenders.

However, O'Donnell's military approach to what was a diplomatic matter proved to be a misstep. By imposing Kittagh as leader, he alienated many, turning previously neutral or supportive nobles against him. This act of unilateral decision-making led the Connachtmen to question if their revolt against English rule had merely replaced one authoritarian ruler with another. O'Donnell's disregard for noble counsel at a site sacred for inaugurations not only embarrassed but also deeply insulted the local nobility.

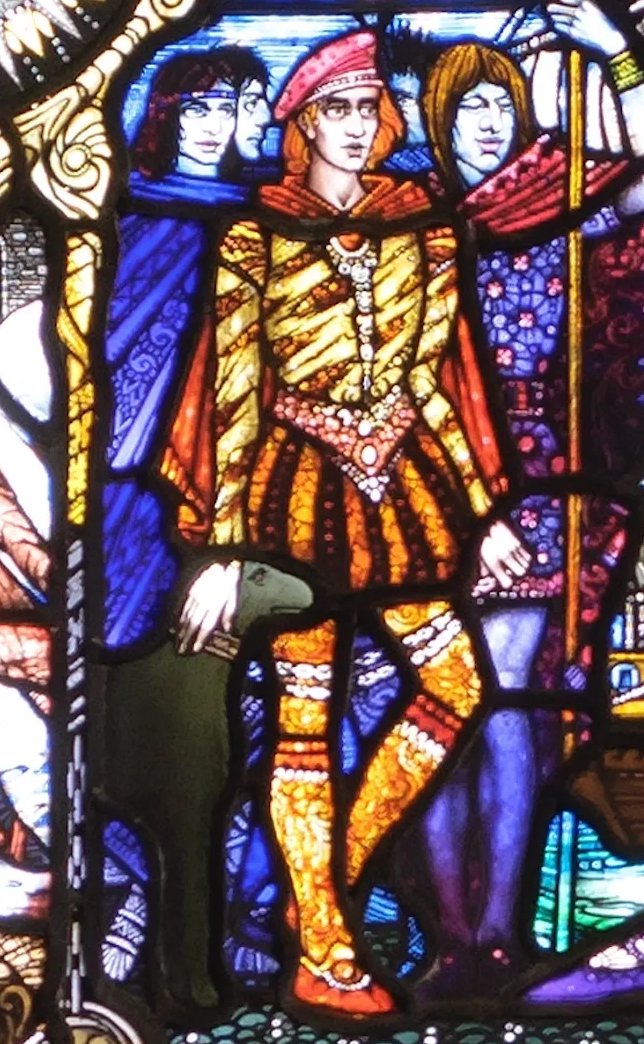
Even after Kittagh's inauguration, Hugh Roe O'Donnell continued to wield significant influence over him.

=== Campaign into Galway ===
Shortly after taking office, Kittagh, accompanied by O'Donnell and several allied chieftains, attacked the town of Athenry, burning it to the ground and capturing all the soldiers from the town and nearby castles. Subsequently, they sent a messenger to Galway city seeking provisions for their war efforts. Denied entry, the messenger was informed of the city's longstanding policy of not opening its gates at night under any circumstances. The Mayor of Galway, Oliver Oge French, expressed distrust toward O'Donnell due to the widespread destruction he had caused since the war began. The next day, O'Donnell sent French a letter offering money for provisions, excluding weapons, in an attempt to alleviate French's concerns. However, he also threatened to harm Galway city if they declined his offer. French replied that he would not assist the Ulster lord and his allies unless they ceased their destructive campaign in Connacht.

In retaliation, on the night of 17 January 1596, Kittagh and O'Donnell executed a surprise attack on Galway, burning several houses on the city's outskirts and killing six people before being driven off by cannon fire. A subsequent attempt to burn the same houses the next afternoon was thwarted when O'Donnell's agents were caught after setting fire to only one house. The rebels then retreated to Mayo, burning every village en route and warning the non-rebellious Galway inhabitants of harsher treatment by the Spaniards compared to what they had inflicted on Athenry. These early raids significantly eroded local support among lords and merchants for the rebel cause.

=== Opposition by rivals and ouster ===
In June 1597, Kittagh and Rory O'Donnell, Hugh's brother, were stationed in Tirawley, with a force 700 strong, 300 Connachtmen and 400 soldiers from Tyrconnell. They were in complete control of Mayo; and all of Connacht except for Galway and Clare had either joined or been captured by the Irish alliance. However, the newly-appointed Governor Conyers Clifford led forces deep into Connacht in an attempt to reassert English control over the area. Clifford ordered Tibbot na Long and O’Conor Sligo, whose forces numbered some 1,000, to rout out the rebels. Clifford marched to Collooney to cut off their retreat. Kittagh and Rory attempted to escape to Ulster in July through the Ox Mountains but were intercepted and decisively beaten by Clifford's forces while attempting to cross the Owenmore River, with the loss 200 men and 1,200 cattle.

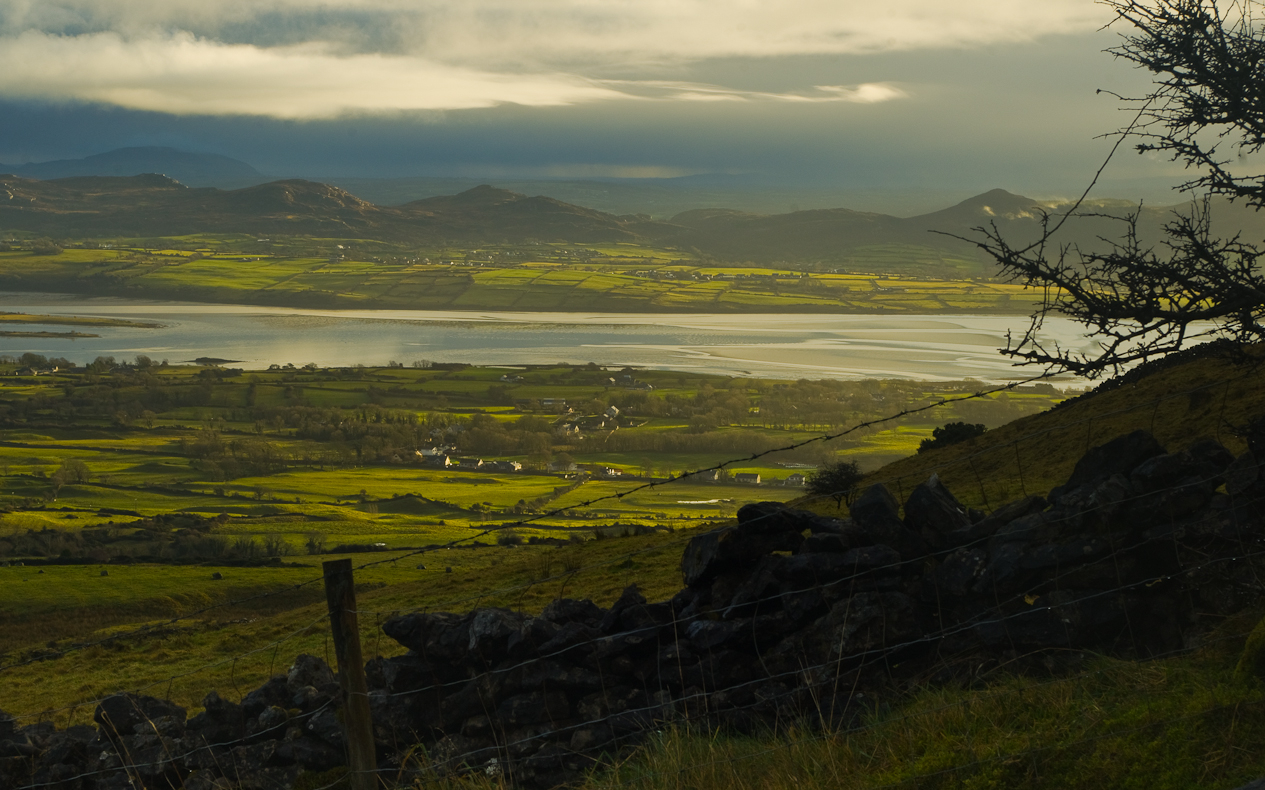
The Ox Mountains were frequently used by the Ulster rebels as route into Connacht.

Building on his success, Clifford led his forces north and laid siege to Ballyshannon. However, he was forced to break the siege and retreat after five days upon receiving news that O'Neill had beaten back an invasion by Lord Burgh in Ulster, and was now free to join his forces with those of O'Donnell, Maguire and O'Rourke, which could potentially cut off Clifford's own retreat.

By the end of September, Kittagh returned to Mayo along with his allies Ulick Burke and Feriagh McHugh. The devastation caused by the war had led to famine and it was becoming increasingly difficult for both the rebels and the English to keep troops in the province for long periods. While his Ulster allies had retreated from the province, Kittagh intended to remain throughout the winter "through the strength of the bogs and the woods" as he knew Clifford did not have adequate manpower or supplies to push him out of Mayo. This second attempt at holding Mayo was also a failure for Kittagh and his allies. Safe in the knowledge that Clifford couldn't venture far into the county, they were ill-prepared for a surprise attack by Tibbot na Long, in which they lost 40 of their men (including Kittagh's brother Thomas) along with the remainder of their supplies, forcing them to retreat once again to Ulster.

By the end of October 1597 Kittagh was once again in exile and all of his approximately 1,000 followers in Mayo who had risen up to join the rebellion had now applied to Clifford for protection from the rebels, chiefly O’Donnell, whom they feared might return. By mid-November sheriffs were re-instated in Mayo and Sligo for the first time in 3 years and Kittagh was left without local allies. Another incursion by Kittagh into the province in January 1598 was quickly repelled.

=== Second return ===
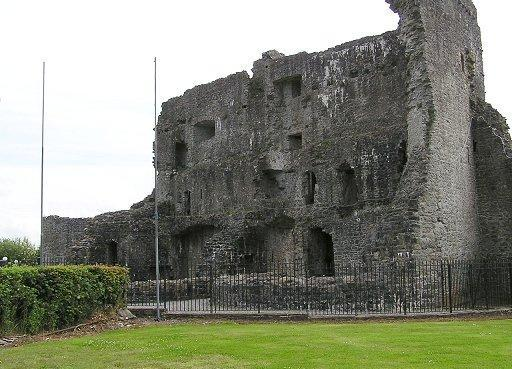
The capture of Ballymote Castle in September 1598 marked the beginning of Kittagh's return.

A truce was signed between the Irish alliance and the Dublin government, in effect from January to June 1598, during which time O’Neill negotiated with the English. One of O’Neill's principal demands was that Kittagh be granted seigniory over the MacWilliam Lordship. This was firmly rejected as Elizabeth had not been beaten to the point where she would be willing to disband her government's administration in Mayo and restore an abolished chieftainship, particularly to someone who was much loathed by his kinsmen and currently living in exile in Tyrconnell.

Relative calm returned to Connacht for the duration of the truce, but following the Irish alliance's decisive victory over the English forces at Yellow Ford on 14 August, the spectre of Kittagh once again loomed over Mayo. The careful patchwork of allegiances that Clifford had established in Mayo was in disarray, with Clifford writing that the allegiances were dependent only upon the promise of a pardon, and would falter in the face of any resistance.

Clifford was evidently correct in this regard as, following O’Donnell and Kittagh's return in mid-September, he noted "On the first day of MacWilliam's coming with O'Donnell's whole force. Mayo and Sligo are entirely lost". The McDonagh’s betrayed the English and took possession of Ballymote Castle, and offered to sell it back to Clifford before handing it over to O’Donnell intact in exchange for £400 and 300 cows. Kittagh marched onto Mayo and re-established himself there.

He now had 2,000 foot and 200 horse, and his forces increased daily by the arrival of Scottish mercenaries. Following the defeat at Yellow Ford, the terrified Dublin government recalled all of its soldiers to protect the capital. Clifford was left powerless with just 120 English soldiers and all of Connacht and Ulster were once again in rebel hands. Vastly outnumbered, Tibbot na Long made use of his family's famed navy and took to the sea with his forces. Kittagh and Niall Garbh raided across Mayo with impunity, crushing all dissent, including the Clangibbon who were wiped out in their entirety following a raid on their castle near Aughagower.

=== Escalation of the war ===
For many months, Clifford made little progress in re-establishing order in Connacht, primarily due to the incompetency of Lord Essex and the Dublin government. At long last 1,000 well-trained English soldiers had arrived and Clifford was able to recover County Clare and Galway city in March 1599. In July, he was given £1500 by the English government, which forbade its administrators in Ireland from diverting from him, and was tasked with rebuilding the castle at Sligo, a town which was presently occupied by the pro-English O’Conors. Tibbot na Long sailed from Galway with military stores, provisions and building supplies and anchored in Sligo Bay awaiting Clifford, who was traveling north from Tulsk. Clifford, however, was not to arrive.

He had received faulty information that Curlew Pass was clear and was ambushed by O’Rourke attempting to cross it. The English forces, numbering some 2,000 were routed with great loss and Clifford was slain. The only thing that prevented complete catastrophe was an uphill cavalry charge led by Sir Griffin Markham, which stalled O'Rourke's men long enough to allow the routed soldiers to escape. This crushing defeat shattered English morale and the O’Conors surrendered to O’Donnell upon receiving Clifford's head.

Tibbot na Long, still anchored offshore, sent Morogh na Maor O’Flaherty to meet and drink wine with O’Donnell. It was here that O’Donnell proposed to O’Flaherty that Tibbot na Long, who possessed 3 three large galleys capable of carrying 300 men each, turn on the English ships accompanying him and seize them. Tibbot na Long declined and sailed back to Galway. He returned in September of that year to besiege Kittagh before being forced offshore again. In Galway, Richard Burke, Lord of Clanricarde, attacked his rival claimant Redmond Burke, Kittagh and O'Donnell's ally, killing 100 of his men.

While Tibbot na Long acted in the Queen's service, his family, remaining officially neutral, continued to support the rebels. Five O’Malley ships stationed themselves in the Shannon Estuary near Limerick, delivering supplies to the rebels and hampering the passage of the river by the English. The war, which initially began as a rebellion in Ulster which had spilled over into Connacht, was now operating on a much wider scale. Most of Leinster and Munster had now also fallen to the rebels and Kittagh's position and importance was much diminished. With so much else to focus on, O'Donnell couldn't afford to lose Mayo, and attempted to broker an end to hostilities there.

=== Plot to assassinate O'Donnell ===
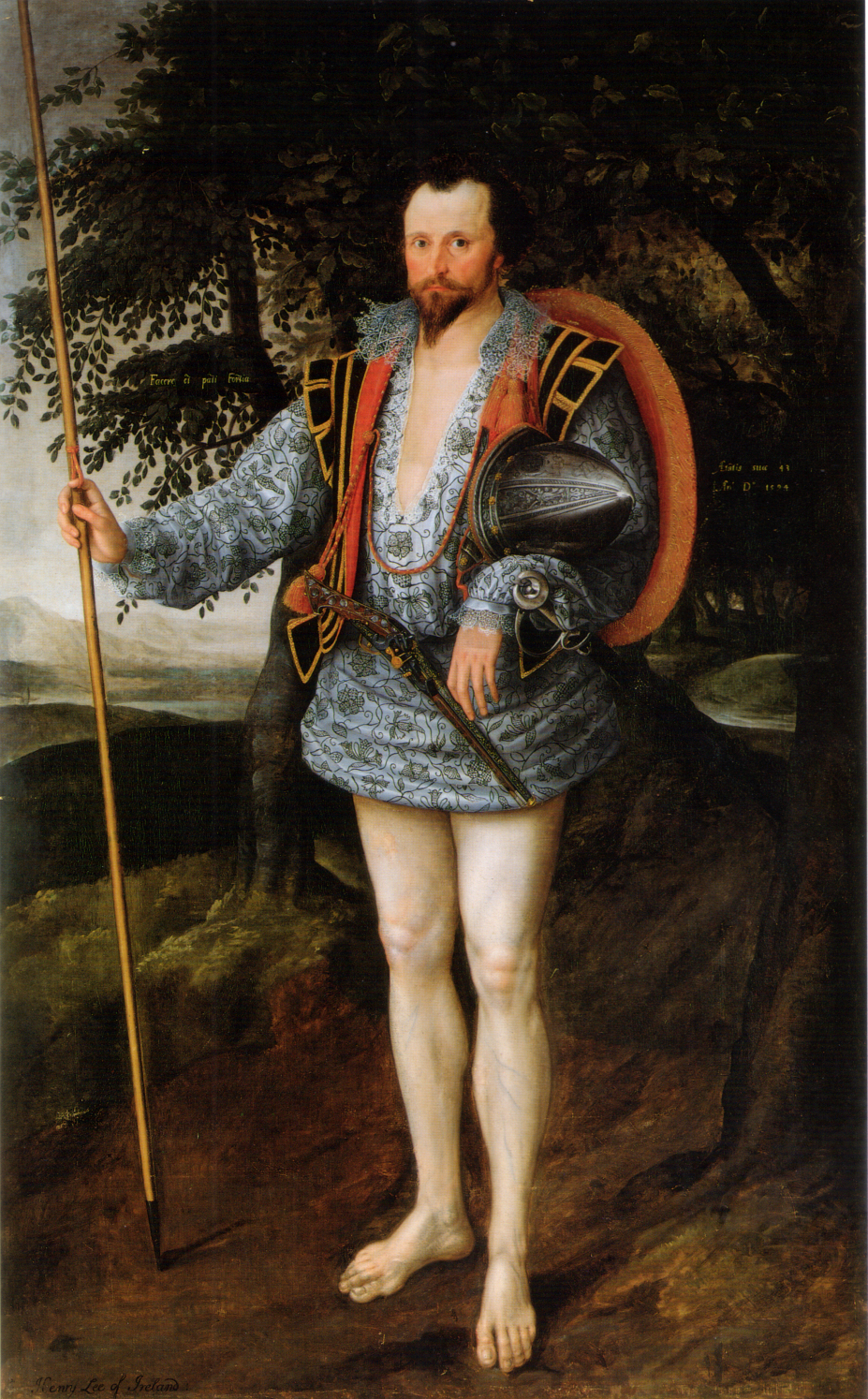
Captain Thomas Lee attempted to use the assassination to further his political career.

O’Donnell arranged a peace treaty between the warring factions of the Mac William Íochtar clan in December 1599, which was primarily a truce between the two Tibbots. In contrast to the previous year, where it was demanded that all of county Mayo be handed over to Kittagh; the rebel command agreed to restrict Kittagh's authority to his own barony of Tirawley in exchange for peace in Mayo. The warring Bourkes were free to fight on opposite sides of the war outside of Mayo, but agreed on an armistice within the county.

Throughout 1600 the English made stunning gains across Ireland, primarily due to Baron Mountjoy's scorched earth policy, which led to widespread famine across the country rendering it difficult for the Irish Alliance to hold onto the land they had taken. The English had a deliberate policy of bringing Irish lords onto their side, thus dividing the alliance. There are numerous examples of this, but the so-called masterstroke of the war came when Niall Garbh betrayed the alliance and allowed 4,000 English soldiers led by Henry Docwra to land at Lough Foyle, gutting the once impenetrable core of the rebellion, Tyrone and Tyrconnell. It was against this backdrop that Kittagh opened up negotiations with the English, hoping to betray O'Donnell in exchange for security of his own lands.

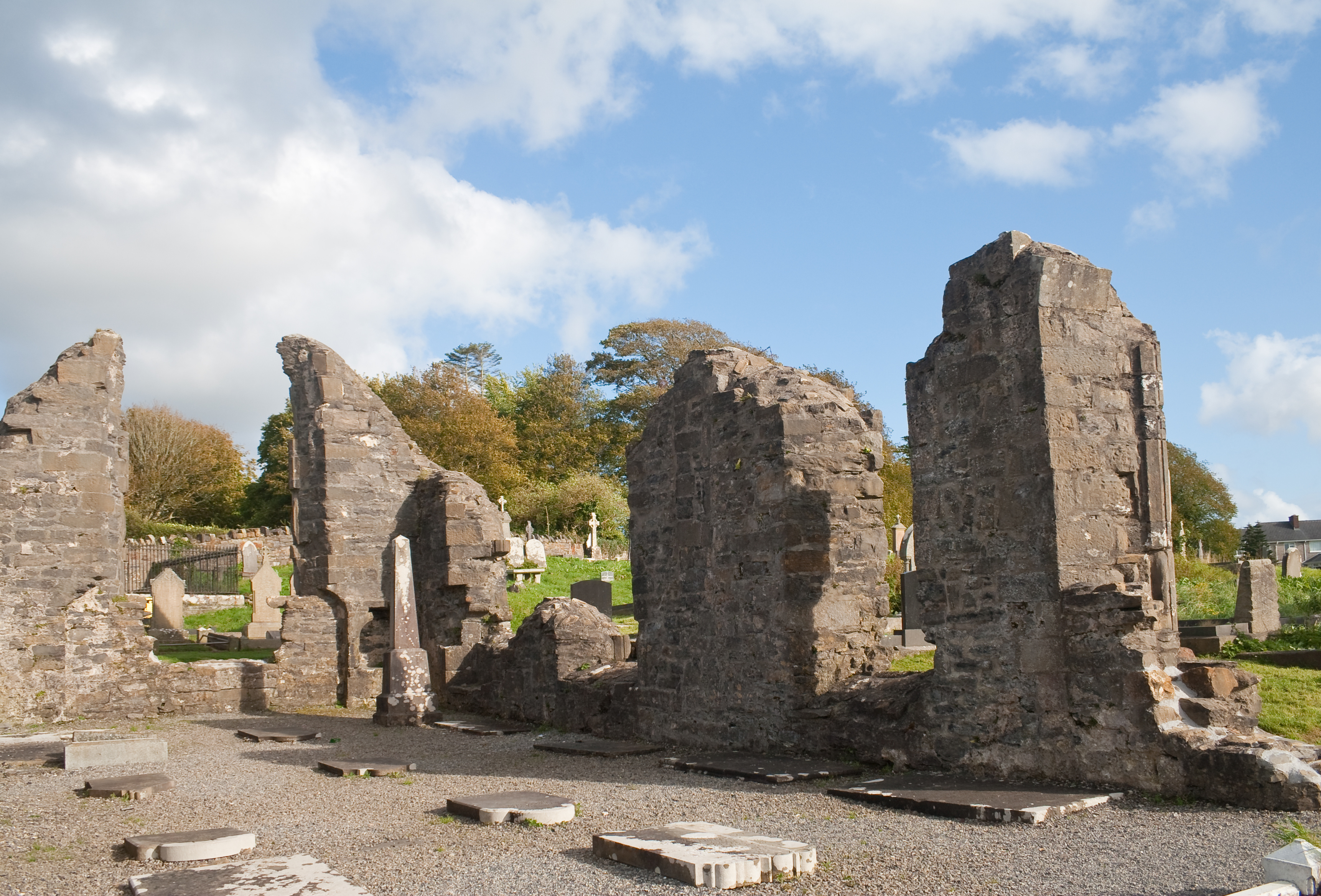
Ruins of Donegal Abbey, where the meeting was meant to take place.

On the one hand O'Donnell had made Kittagh "the MacWilliam" and had supported him against his rivals throughout the war, but on the other hand had laid waste to Mayo. O'Donnell carried all the spoils of war back to Tyrconnell, failing to invest in his allies in Connacht. He therefore had effectively left Kittagh in charge of a desolate, largely hostile land incapable of sustaining enough troops to defend itself. Much of the fighting done by the lords of Connacht was done outside of their own war-shattered province.

Conscious of the changing tide of the war, Kittagh traveled to Galway city in June 1600 to meet with the notorious assassin James Blake (alias Captain Blackcaddell, the man who would later attempt to poison O'Donnell in Spain in 1602) to propose a plan of betrayal which was to be passed on by Blake to Captain Thomas Lee, whose eagerness to advance politically saw him engaged in widespread machinations throughout Ireland. Kittagh had intended to lure his "ally" to Donegal Abbey and kill O'Donnell. It was also hoped that O'Neill would attend, in which case he would be captured alive and sent to England, where he would surrender and call for an end to the war in Ireland. Lee, keen to reign in the influence of his Irish rival Thomas Butler, amended the plan on 7 September, requesting that Kittagh also murder Teigue O'Rourke and Donnchadh O'Conor at the meeting as they were "both Ormonde's", referring to their amenable relations with Butler.

O'Donnell would frequently return to Donegal to confer with his allies and meet those who had arrived in French and Spanish ships bringing supplies and intel. Kittagh, knowing he would be welcomed into Tyrconnell, planned to travel to the kingdom with 400 men. He would then kill and/or capture the rebel commanders and bring them or their bodies to Killybegs castle on Donegal's west coast, which he planned to purchase from Chief MacSweeny, his brother-in-law, for approximately £1,000. Kittagh and his men would then hold the castle until an English ship arrived to collect them.

After much back and forth between Kittagh and Lee, a final list of demands was compiled, which stated:

- Kittagh be granted the title Earl of Mayo
- To be her Majesty's lieutenant of the county
- To have 150 horse and 50 foot
- To receive £1,000 at once
- Brian Óg O'Rourke to be made lord of his country and her Majesty's lieutenant for it, with 100 horse
- Captain T. Lee to be governor of Connaught.

Lee's influence on these amended demands is clear, and most of them were accepted by the Queen on 24 December 1600, however she would not make Lee the governor of Connaught and Kittagh would receive his payment after he carried out the deed. Without the money for MacSweeny's castle paid to him in advance, it was impossible for Kittagh to carry out these assassinations. Following Lee's execution for treason in February 1601 the plan was abandoned permanently.

=== Final months and departure to Spain ===
For unknown reasons, the peace that had existed in Mayo since December 1599 began to unravel in early 1601. Tibbot na Long moved his troops into Tirawley in a surprise attack on Kittagh on 2 March. Kittagh lost many men and arms and was forced to flee to Ulster yet again. In an unexpected return to ancient tradition for the loyalist lord, Tibbot na Long assembled a council of the nobles of Mac William Iochtar the following day in which they elected Richard "the Devils Hook" Bourke, Tibbot na Long's brother-in-law, as the 22nd MacWilliam Íochtar. With O'Donnell preoccupied elsewhere, Kittagh spent the next several months in exile waiting for assistance. Finally, in October 1601 he was provided with "all the men O'Donnell could spare" and re-invaded Mayo. While marching back to his home of Tirawley, Kittagh encountered the forces of his rival claimant and a fierce battle ensued during which Richard was killed. Kittagh once again proclaimed himself the chief of Mayo.

With only 300 men to his name, Tibbot na Long embarked on his three ships and departed the county. With his rivals beaten and peace having returned to Mayo, Kittagh joined O'Donnell at the Battle of Kinsale in late 1601. Following the defeat of the allied forces at Kinsale, Kittagh traveled with O'Donnell to Spain, landing in Luarca on 13 January 1602. Their allies were defeated in 1603 while they were away and Kittagh never returned. He was conferred the title of Marquess of Mayo by the Spanish monarch, Philip III, and he and his family were given a suitable pension to live on.

Tibbot MacWalter Burke died young of a fever, lasting 30 days, and was buried in November 1604. He was buried in the Chapel of Wonders in the Convent of St. Francis, Valladolid—the same chapel where O'Donnell was buried in 1602. His son, Walter (living c.1650), later succeeded as 2nd Marquess of Mayo.

== Arms ==
Coat of arms of Tibbot MacWalter Kittagh Bourke
Escutcheon Party per fess Or and Ermine, a cross gules the first quarter charged with a lion rampant sable and the second with a dexter hand couped at the wrist and erect gules

== Genealogy ==
Mac William Íochtar Genealogy
- Sir Edmond Albanach de Burgh (d. 1375), 1st Mac William Íochtar (Lower Mac William), (Mayo)
  - William de Burgh (d.1368)
  - Thomas mac Edmond Albanach de Burca, 1375–1402, 2nd Mac William Íochtar
    - Walter mac Thomas de Burca (d.1440), 3rd Mac William Íochtar
      - Theobald Bourke (d.1503), 8th Mac William Íochtar
        - Meiler Bourke (d.1520), 11th Mac William Íochtar
      - Ricard Bourke (d.1509), 9th Mac William Íochtar
        - Seaán an Tearmainn Bourke (alive 1527), 13th Mac William Íochtar
          - Ricard mac Seaán an Tearmainn Bourke (d.1571), 16th Mac William Íochtar
    - Edmund na Féasóige de Burca, (d.1458), 4th Mac William Íochtar
      - Ricard Ó Cuairsge Bourke (d.1473), 7th Mac William Íochtar
        - Edmond de Burca (d.1527), 10th Mac William Íochtar
        - Walter de Burca
        - Seaán de Burca
          - Oliver de Burca
            - Seaán mac Oliver Bourke (d.1580), 17th Mac William Íochtar
            - Richard Bourke (d.1586), 19th Mac William Íochtar
              - Walter Ciotach de Burca of Belleek (d.1591)
                - Tibbot (Theobald) MacWalter Kittagh Bourke, 21st Mac William Íochtar, 1st Marquess of Mayo
                  - Walter (Balthasar) Bourke, 2nd Marquess of Mayo
      - Thomas Ruadh de Burca
      - Uilleag de Burca
        - Edmond de Burca (d.1527), 12th Mac William Íochtar
          - David de Burca (alive 1537), 15th Mac William Íochtar
            - Richard the Iron Bourke (d.1583), 18th Mac William Íochtar
              - Tibbot (Theobald) ne Long Bourke (1567-1629), 23rd Mac William Íochtar, 1st Viscount Mayo (1627)
                - Viscounts Mayo
            - William "the Blind Abbot" Bourke (d.1593), 20th Mac William Íochtar
        - Theobald mac Uilleag Bourke (d.1537), 14th Mac William Íochtar
        - Risdeárd de Burca
          - Ricard Deamhan an Chorráin de Burca
            - Risdeárd Mac Deamhan an Chorráin (Richard) "the Devils Hook" Bourke (d.1601), 22nd Mac William Íochtar
    - Seaán de Burca (d.1456)
    - Tomás Óg de Burca, (d.1460), 5th Mac William Íochtar
    - Risdeárd de Burca (d.1473), 6th Mac William Íochtar

== See also ==
- House of Burgh, an Anglo-Norman and Hiberno-Norman dynasty founded in 1193
- Clanricarde
- Burke Civil War 1333–38
- Ireland 1536–1691
- Surrender and regrant

Preceded by William "the Blind Abbot" Bourke	Mac William Iochtar; December 1595 – March 1601	Succeeded by Richard "the Devils Hook" Bourke
Preceded by Richard "the Devils Hook" Bourke	Mac William Iochtar; October 1601 – January 1602	Succeeded by Title Abolished
Spanish nobility
Preceded by New Creation	Marquess of Mayo; 1602–?	Succeeded by Walter Bourke, 2nd Marquess of Mayo
