= Margaret Lee (lady-in-waiting) =

English courtier and lady-in-waiting

Margaret Wyatt
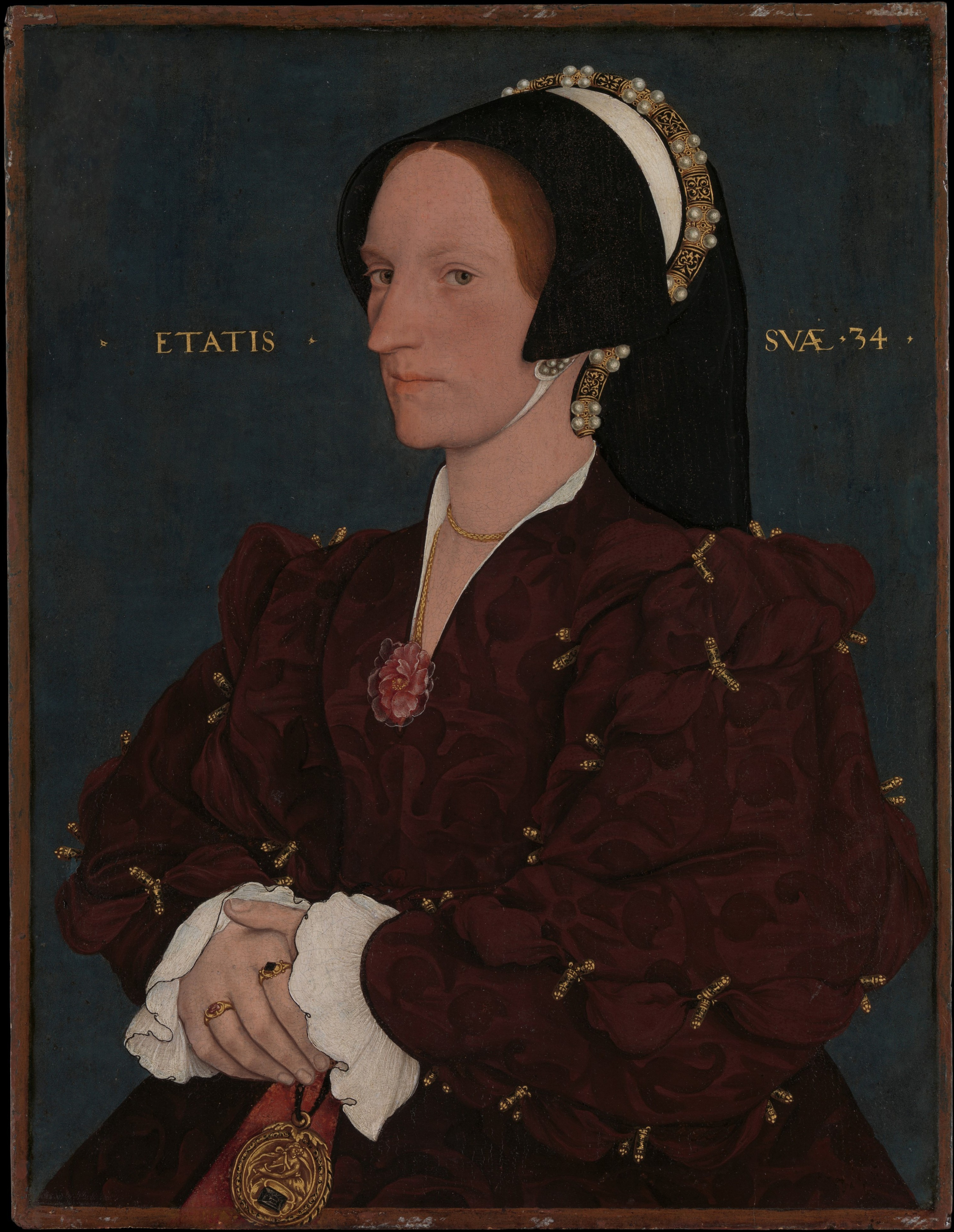
- Margaret Wyatt, by Hans Holbein
- Born: c. 1506
- Died: c. 1543
- Spouse: Sir Anthony Lee
- Issue: Sir Henry Lee; Robert Lee; Thomas Lee; Cromwell Lee; Anne Lee; Lettice Lee; Katherine Lee; Joyce Lee; Jane Lee
- Father: Sir Henry Wyatt
- Mother: Anne Skinner

Lady Margaret Lee (née Wyatt; c. 1506 – c. 1543) was an English courtier. She was a sister of the poet Thomas Wyatt and a friend of Queen Anne Boleyn, second wife of King Henry VIII. Historians have speculated that she may have been present during Boleyn's execution.

== Family ==
Margaret Wyatt was the daughter of Sir Henry Wyatt by Anne Skinner, the daughter of John Skinner of Reigate, Surrey. She had two brothers:

- Sir Thomas Wyatt, who married Elizabeth Brooke, the daughter of Thomas Brooke, 8th Baron Cobham, by Dorothy Heydon, daughter of Sir Henry Heydon and Elizabeth or Anne Boleyn, daughter of Sir Geoffrey Boleyn.
- Henry Wyatt, assumed to have died an infant.

== Life ==
Margaret is best remembered for having been a companion of Anne Boleyn, whose family estates lay near the Wyatts' and who later employed Margaret as one of her ladies-in-waiting. A portrait by Hans Holbein the Younger shows a woman presumed to be Margaret at the age of thirty-four, and it is assumed that it was painted around 1540. It is therefore probable that Margaret was close to Anne in age, being born around 1506 (Anne's date of birth is unknown, but is commonly thought to have been in 1501 or 1507).

Few question that there was some form of friendship between Lady Margaret and Queen Anne. There is also a strong tradition which states that Margaret's sister, Mary, was also part of the Queen's social circle and that Margaret's brother, Thomas Wyatt, fell passionately in love with Anne in the 1520s. Another female favourite of the Queen's was Lady Bridget Wingfield, who died while giving birth in 1534.

Margaret was one of Anne's chief ladies-in-waiting, and accompanied her to Calais, France in 1532, where it is presumed Anne and Henry VIII made secret plans to marry in the immediate future. It is known that Anne had a lady-in-waiting who "she loves as a sister", and it has been suggested that this lady was Margaret.

She was certainly part of the Queen's circle of favourites. As Mistress of the Queen's Wardrobe, she would presumably have played a leading part in the decadent social life at court in the mid-1530s, which was fuelled by the extravagance of Henry and Anne.

Lady Margaret was sent to attend her royal mistress in the Tower of London in May 1536 when the Queen was arrested on charges of adultery, treason and incest. She attended Anne on the scaffold on 19 May, and even received the last gift of a prayer book from her. Anne had written a short farewell inside the prayer book:

"Remember me when you do pray,

that hope doth lead from day to day."

A sketch by the famed court artist Hans Holbein has been identified as being a sketch of a Queen Anne Boleyn when she was pregnant, but current research suggests that it might have been one of the Wyatt sisters — either Margaret or her sister, Mary.

Lady Margaret Lee is commemorated in Songs and Sonnets, also known as Tottel's Miscellany, a poetry anthology published by the law printer Richard Tottel in 1557. The book contains poems written by Lady Margaret's brother, Sir Thomas Wyatt, as well as poems by the Earl of Surrey, Nicholas Grimald and a number of anonymous poets. Grimald's funeral elegy, "An Epitaph of the Lady Margaret Lee", advises the reader, "Man, by a woman learn, this life what we may call," and praises her "blood, friendship, beauty, youth," and other qualities (no. 158, 1–2). Lady Margaret is one of several Tudor ladies memorialized in the volume.

== Marriage and issue ==
About 6 July 1532 Margaret Wyatt married Sir Anthony Lee (d.1549), by whom she had four sons and five daughters:

- Sir Henry Lee.
- Robert Lee (died c.1598).
- Thomas Lee.
- Cromwell Lee (d.1601), who compiled an Italian-English dictionary.
- Anne Lee, who married Leonard Spenser of Naunton Hall in Rendlesham, Suffolk.
- Lettice Lee, who married Nicholas Cooke of Linstead, Suffolk.
- Katherine Lee, who married Gyles Symonds (died circa 1596) of Cley next the Sea, Norfolk.
- Joyce Lee, who married, on 29 November 1562, John Chenye, son of Sir Robert Chenye of Chesham Bois, Buckinghamshire.
- Jane Lee, who married Peter Reade of Gimingham, Norfolk.
