= Thomas Lee (army captain) =

English army captain (16th century)

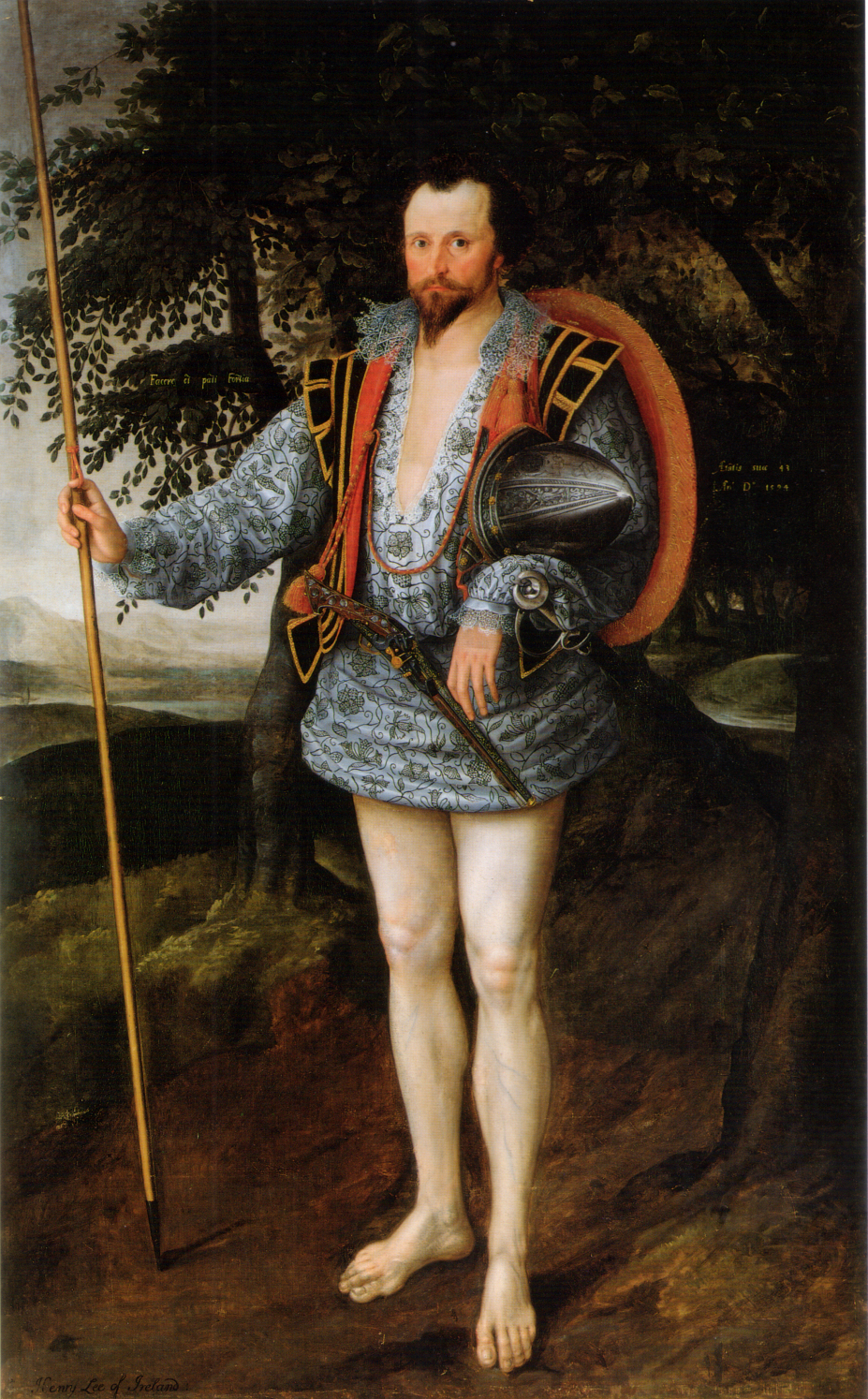
- Thomas Lee in an English interpretation of Irish dress by Marcus Gheeraerts the Younger, 1594
- Born: March 1553; Bygging Hall, Nr Granborough, Buckinghamshire, England
- Died: 14 February 1601 (aged 49–50); Tyburn
- Spouses: Elizabeth Peppard; Kinborough Valentine
- Issue: Henry Lee; Margaret Lee
- Father: Benedict Lee
- Mother: Margaret Pakington

Thomas Lee (1551/2 – 14 February 1601) was an English army captain, who served under Queen Elizabeth I and spent most of his career in Ireland during the Tudor conquest of that country. Although of middle rank, he played a turbulent role in the factional politics of the time and was highly active during the Nine Years' War (1593–1603). He was put to death at Tyburn for his involvement in the treason of the 2nd Earl of Essex.

== Early life ==
Thomas Lee was the grandson of Robert Lee (d.1539) by his second wife, Lettice Peniston, widow of Sir Robert Knollys, and daughter of Thomas Peniston of Hawridge, Buckinghamshire. His parents were Benedict Lee (d. February 1559) and Margaret Pakington, the daughter of Robert Pakington.

By his first wife, Robert Lee was the father of Sir Anthony Lee, and Thomas Lee was thus a cousin of the half blood of Sir Anthony Lee's eldest son and heir, the courtier Sir Henry Lee, Queen Elizabeth's champion.

== Career ==
Lee eventually became attached to Walter Devereux, 1st Earl of Essex. He probably arrived in Ireland in 1574 to take part in the colonisation scheme of Essex in eastern Ulster, and in 1576 was serving as constable of Carrickfergus.

By his marriage in 1578 to the Irish Catholic widow, Elizabeth Peppard, widow of John Eustace, he came into considerable property, including Castlemartin in County Kildare. He later bought Castle Reban, seeking its fee farm in April 1583, and much other property.

In 1580 he was charged with highway robbery in Oxfordshire, but upon his release on bail he returned to Ireland.

== Rebellion in the Pale ==
In 1581, Lee and his wife were cited in a petition to Lord Deputy Grey for wrongs done to Robert Pipho, who made further complaint against him in the following year for cattle theft. However, Grey was relying on Lee to counter the Eustace rebellion in the Pale and suppressed the charges. Lee managed to capture the rebel brother of Viscount Baltinglass, Thomas Eustace, and incurred the displeasure of the Earl of Ormond, who objected to his invasions of Tipperary, describing him as, "this railing fellow". The following year in Waterford he had to clear himself of "clamorous complaints".

In February 1583, after the suppression of the rebellion, Lee's company of 24 horsemen was disbanded. He was commended by the archbishop of Dublin, Adam Loftus, and Geoffrey Fenton, the latter commenting that he was "not without his portion of that common and secret envy which biteth most of us that serve here". At the same time Grey wrote to the queen's secretary, Walsingham, that Lee should have 200 Irish soldiers to conduct into Flanders, noting that "Lee is settled to reform his mis-spent life by hazard in service".

Lee had taken into his custody various properties of Baltinglas, for which he made petition, and managed to settle in Kildare, where he proposed to defend the country with 25 horsemen and 50 foot. This proposal was favoured by Loftus, who noted that Lee, "hath so weeded out those parts of that lewd sort of people as the inhabitants of their own report find great quiet and better security of their lives, goods and cattle than of many years they have had". The privy council wrote to Lee in July 1583 granting the horse and men.

== Service under Perrot ==
In 1584-5 Lee complained of his loss of horse under Bagenal and Stanley in the north on campaign against Sorley Boy MacDonnell. He then visited England, and was employed in the autumn of 1585 by the new lord deputy, John Perrot, against the rebel Cahir Oge Kavanagh in Kilkenny. There he ran into the sheriff who "grew to words and so to blows" with him; Lee was outnumbered 300 to 60 but still managed to capture the sheriff and kill several of his men. This event cemented the enmity of the Earl of Ormond, but Lee was able to rely upon the backing of Walsingham and Perrot, who allowed that he had acted according to duty.

Lee plotted to take the leader of the rebellious bastard Leinster Geraldines, Walter Reagh, but the plot was betrayed by Lee's wife, Elizabeth, who had been an interpreter in negotiations with the rebels. Lee separated from his wife in October 1587, but it seems he maintained some relations with her. By this time he had fallen out with Perrot - in part because of non-payment for his services - and was imprisoned for eight weeks in Dublin Castle and deprived of his company. Lee sent his wife to court to plead his case, and in 1588 she was still there requesting that a band of 50 men taken from another captain be assigned to her husband.

In 1591 Lee suffered "a great casual fire by the means of lewd servants" at Castlemartin, which cost him £1,000 and left him and his wife with nothing but their clothes and some horses. He laid the blame for this incident on Nicholas White, a senior judge and adherent of Ormond's.

== Ulster ==
In 1593 Lee took part in the expedition against Hugh Maguire under the new lord deputy, William FitzWilliam. Following the Battle of Belleek he was commended for bravery by Hugh O'Neill, Earl of Tyrone and by Bagenal, having been the first to enter the ford on the river Erne.

Lee became intimate with O'Neill, and was useful to the government during negotiations with the earl in March 1594, prior to the outbreak of the Nine Years' War. On one occasion, the earl requested the company of "Tom Lee": along with another intermediary, Lee accompanied the earl and, on his return, reported that some of the earl's party had pointed weapons at his breast and beaten him and his companion with their staves, whereupon the earl had advised him to depart.

Lee went to England as intermediary, and about this time he wrote his Brief Declaration, which was presented to the queen in November and duly ignored. He also had his portrait done by Marcus Gheeraerts the Younger. In his writings he cast himself in the model of the Roman hero Scaevola, who had entered the Etruscan camp to assassinate the king and, upon his discovery and trial, had thrust his right hand in the flame, whereupon a treaty had been concluded. The parallel was with Lee's relations with O'Neill, and his argument seems to have been that the rebels were in arms because the crown had waged its campaign beyond Fermanagh and Monaghan into the heart of O'Neill's territory in Ulster. However, Lord Deputy FitzWilliam - at whose door Lee had laid the principal blame for the war - described him to Lord Burghley as "indigent and desperate", and recommended he be barred from the queen's presence.

Lee returned to Ireland in September 1595 and killed Kedagh MacPhelim Reagh. Harrington deemed it a cruel murder, and Lee was again imprisoned in Dublin Castle. In March 1596 Lee served under Lord Deputy Russell and took Cloghan Castle. The garrison refused to yield to him or evacuate the women, so he breached the walls and set fire to the thatched roof: forty-six died, either in the flames or by being thrown over the walls by Lee's soldiers.

In April 1596 Lee wrote to the queen's principal secretary, Lord Burghley, again urging a conciliatory policy towards O'Neill - now a proclaimed rebel - who proposed to go to England on a safe conduct from the queen. Lee complained that the rebellion could have been avoided had his original advice been taken. At this stage he was being sued for arrears of Crown rents. By the summer he had grown sceptical of O'Neill, who was "too far gone with pride of his own strength and confidence of foreign assistance, that he is past all hope of being reclaimed otherwise than by force".

== Pursuit of O'Byrne ==
Lee began to protest that he would die the poorest man in Her Majesty's service: he claimed that the clan leader and ally of O'Neill, Fiach McHugh O'Byrne, was hindering his proceedings with the rebel earl, and that the Earl of Ormond's family, the Butlers, had seized 500 cows from his land and burnt to the ground six of his newly built towns.

In December 1596 Lord Deputy Russell reported that Lee had sent in seventeen rebel heads, a service which was highly paid. In the following April Lee complained to the Queen's secretary, Robert Cecil, of slanderous reports against himself and sought authority to take, banish or kill O'Byrne. At this time he seems to have been fed up with his miserable service in Ireland, but Russell had further use for him.

Lee was promoted to provost-marshal of Connacht; the following month he commanded the party which killed the ailing O'Byrne and was commended by Loftus. In a meeting with the rebels, he later denied on the book that he had been privy to the killing and denounced it as he had gained nothing by it; his soldiers then joined with the rebels in raiding twenty-six towns in O'Byrne's country. By November Lee was covertly seeking O'Neill's forgiveness for O'Byrne's death, but he did receive O'Byrne lands from the government and was also granted a commission for martial law throughout south Leinster.

Lee preferred articles of treason against the sheriff of Kilkenny for secretly maintaining Rice O'Toole. She was imprisoned in the castle, and Lee had her execution stayed in return for her promise to assist in the apprehension and killing of O'Byrne's sons, two of whom were married to her own sisters. Lee was accused of pulling out the eyes of Art O'Toole while the latter was under protection, and of driving the victim's brother, Rowny, into rebellion while under the same protection.

== War ==
When O'Neill had defeated Bagenal at the Battle of the Yellow Ford in 1598, Lee was confined to prison at Dublin for twenty weeks on charges of treason brought against him by Ormond and the sheriff of Kilkenny following his efforts to have the rebel leader installed as president of Ulster. Rice O'Toole's sisters offered evidence against Lee in return for protection. The attorney general thought a jury conviction touch and go, observing that "he hath good merits and evil infirmities". Evidence was heard, Lee showed his letters of commission empowering him to parley with rebels, and said that his letter from O'Neill was made privy to the Lords Justice. Having apologised on his knees before the council, he was liberated and went on to revictual Maryborough fort.

In October 1598 Lee took a company of 100 foot with Ormond into Munster to suppress the rebellion in that province. A month later he was in prison having asserted that Ormond was stirring rebellion and had secret agreements with O'Neill and the Earl of Kildare. He claimed to have dissuaded Kildare from rebellion and to have been behind a scheme to overthrow Ormond, whereby the earl's daughter was to marry Kildare with a dowry of £2,000-3,000.

== Essex ==
In April 1599 Lee's patron, William FitzGerald, 13th Earl of Kildare, died in a shipwreck while travelling to join Essex in Ireland at the start of the latter's costly and unsuccessful campaign against O'Neill.

Upon his release, Lee went secretly to O'Neill in the summer of 1599 for a few days. It was put about that a plot to kill Ormond had been drawn up during that visit, but Essex forgave him his unauthorised communications. In August he again visited the rebel earl with the cognisance of Sir Christopher Blount; finding O'Neill "quite changed from his former disposition and possessed with insolency and arrogancy", Lee cursed him and left.

Lee went to England after September 1599 and sought to speak with his cousin, Ditchley, because the latter was in bonds on his behalf. At the time he was under house arrest with Essex, who said that he had given Lee leave to go to his cousin, but had commanded him not to resort to London or the court. However Lee did go to court, where he was slandered by the archbishop of Cashel, Miler Magrath, with the "most indecent and contumelious words" and accused of treason; Lee wrote to Cecil seeking an opportunity to meet the charges.

In April 1600 Lee petitioned for a return to Ireland. At about this time he submitted his Discovery - written while under house arrest - in which he proposed the recovery of the province of Leinster, and sought the seneschalship of O'Byrne's country and the lieutenancy of Leix as well as the distribution amongst his followers of the rebels' lands. He later proposed to ally with chiefs in Connacht, notably McWilliam who had undertaken to seize Hugh Roe O'Donnell in return for the Earldom and lieutenancy of Mayo plus £1000 with Lee to act as chief commander of Connacht. The Queen agreed to all, except the appointment of Lee, and stipulated that the payment would be made after the fact. By December Lee had fallen ill and there was a delay in the response to his proposals.

On 12 February 1601, four days after Essex was apprehended on charges of treason, Lee sought the assistance of Sir Henry Nevill and Sir Robert Crosse (a naval captain who was knighted by Essex in the expedition to Cadiz in 1596) with four other gentlemen, to surprise the queen in her privy chamber at supper time. His plan was to lock the queen in and pin her up until she signed a warrant for the delivery of Essex. However, Crosse informed the authorities of their plan, and Lee was apprehended as he watched the door of the chamber in preparation for an attempt on the following evening.

Lee was tried on 13 February. Crosse testified against him. Lee denied the construction put upon his words by the attorney-general and spoke boldly in defence of Essex, who had written in commendation of him to Lord Mountjoy. He admitted that, "it was ever my fault to be loose and lavish of my tongue", adding that, "he had lived in misery and cared not to live, his enemies were so many and so great". In reference to the Queen, he simply said he meant, "to vex her for half an hour, that she might live all the merrier all her life after". Upon conviction and sentencing he pleaded for his son's inheritance. He was put to death at Tyburn on 14 February, dying "very christianly". Essex was put to death eleven days later.

== Marriages and issue ==
Lee married firstly, in 1578, Elizabeth Peppard, a recusant and widow of John Eustace, and daughter of Cuthbert Peppard, by whom he had a son and a daughter:

- Henry Lee (c. 1585 – 9 October 1657), who was heir at law to his father's cousin of the half blood, Sir Henry Lee, but did not receive the bulk of the estates as Sir Henry Lee contrived to leave them to another distant kinsman. He was knighted 19 May 1618, and died unmarried at the age of seventy-two. He was buried at Tortworth, Gloucestershire.
- Margaret Lee, who married Sir Charles Manners, son of Sir Thomas Manners and Theodosia Newton, daughter of Sir Thomas Newton.

He married secondly, in 1595, Kinborough Valentine, an Irish recusant. Kinborough had three children in Co. Kildare, Ireland: William 1593, Martha 1591 and Mary 1592. They were not baptised as infants. Their baptisms were in 1609, 1610 and 1611 when 18 year old adults. Church records at St. Mary's Hardwick name their father.

== Writings ==
- A brief declaration of the government of Ireland – c. 1594
- The discovery and recovery of Ireland with the author's apology – c. 1599

== Portrait ==
Lee's portrait was painted in 1594, when he was 43 years old, by the Flemish artist Marcus Gheeraerts the Younger. It was probably commissioned by his half-cousin, Sir Henry Lee. The subject is shown in the regalia of a captain of the royal kerne, posing with legs and feet bare, and armed with shield, sword, helmet, pike and petronel (horse pistol). The legs and feet were bare for fighting in Irish bogs.
