= Richard Lee (died 1608) =

English politician

Sir Richard Lee (died 22 December 1608) was an English politician who sat in the House of Commons in two parliaments between 1593 and 1608 and served as Ambassador to Russia.

== Family ==
Lee was the illegitimate son of Sir Anthony Lee of Quarrendon, Buckinghamshire by Ann Hassall, daughter of Richard Hassall of Hassall and Hankelow, Cheshire. He was half-brother to Sir Henry Lee K.G. of Ditchley, Master of the Ordnance and Robert Lee.

== Career ==
He was abroad in 1582, possibly in Russia and he was a volunteer against the Spanish Armada in 1588. His first marriage to the widow of Sir Gerald Croker of Hook Norton led to prolonged legal proceedings over the inheritance of two manors. Through his second marriage he acquired a manor known as Dane John or the 'Dungeon' in Canterbury, and went to live there. He became Freeman of Canterbury in 1590 and was a J.P. for Kent from about 1591. He was a common councilman by 1593 in which year he was elected Member of Parliament for Canterbury.

By 1599 Lee was being proposed as ambassador to Russia where the Muscovy merchants were eager to develop trade. He was constable of Harlech castle by 1600. He was knighted on 1 June 1600 and set sail by mid-June as ambassador to Russia, with ten ships and nearly fifty men. He reached Archangel on 30 July, but was too ill to carry on for a while. He stayed in Russia for about ten months and was well received and much respected. However apart from small items of gossip he brought little back from the expedition. Not only did the hoped trade fail to materialise, but Lee was refused payment for expenses and he was in financial difficulty for the rest of his life. In 1602 he attended the opening of the Bodleian Library at Oxford which was founded by his friend Sir Thomas Bodley and donated some Russian books. While there he was robbed of two jewels worth 200 marks. He was ranger of Canterbury park by 1604. In 1604 he was elected MP for Woodstock.

Lee died in December 1608, and was buried on 4 January 1609 at Hardwick, Buckinghamshire, next to his mother. In his will he left to the Bodleian Library a magnificent "tartar lamb" coat which had been given to him by the Tsar. The coat may have been intended as a present for Queen Elizabeth, but was kept by Lee because she would not pay his expenses.

== Marriages and issue ==
Lee married firstly Lady Mary Croker, widow of Sir Gerald Croker of Hook Norton and daughter of John Blundell of Finmere and Steeple Barton, Oxfordshire. He married secondly in 1589, Lady Alice Hales, widow of Sir James Hales (d.1589) of Dane John, Canterbury, and daughter of Sir Thomas Kempe (d. 7 March 1591) of Olantigh in Wye, Kent, by his first wife, Katherine Cheney (d. before 1550), daughter of Sir Thomas Cheney, Lord Warden of the Cinque Ports.

== Notes ==
Parliament of England
Preceded by Simon Brome; Bartholomew Brome	Member of Parliament for Canterbury; 1593; With: Sir Henry Finch	Succeeded by Sir Henry Finch; John Boys
Preceded by Lawrence Tanfield; William Scott	Member of Parliament for Woodstock; 1604–1608; With: Thomas Spencer	Succeeded by Thomas Spencer; Sir James Whitelocke
