= Henry Wyatt (courtier) =

English nobleman (c. 1460–1537)

Sir Henry Wyatt KB
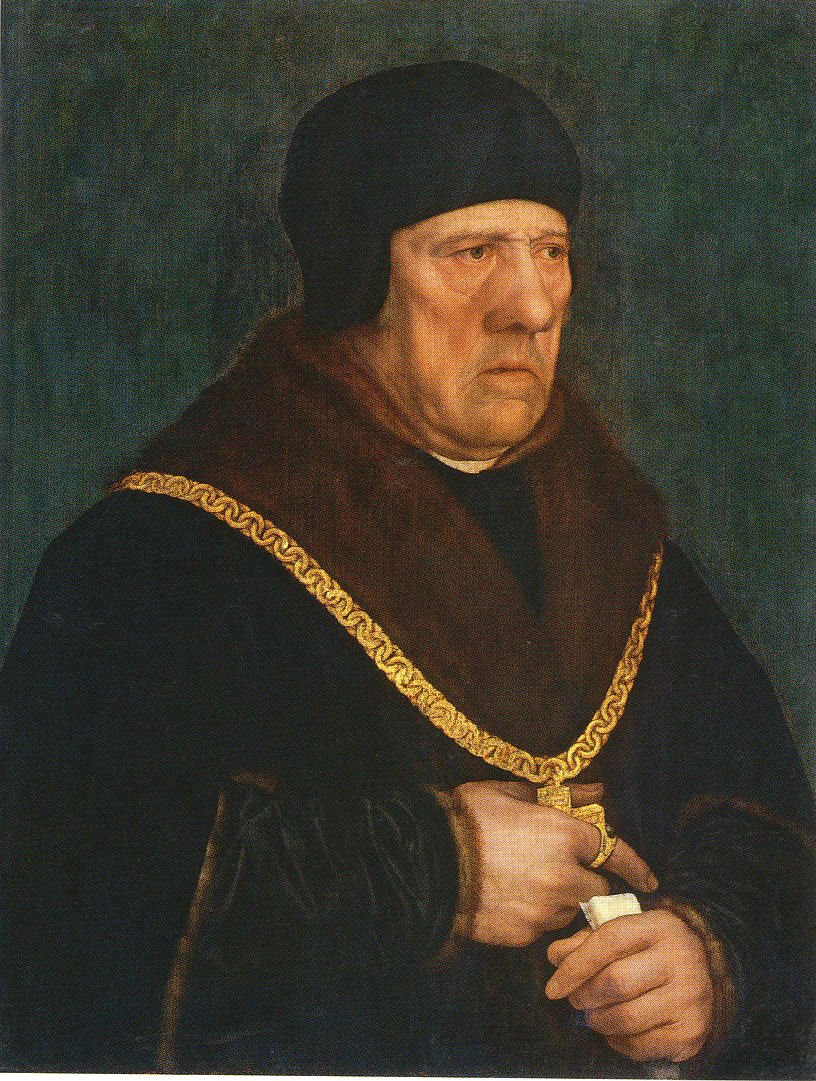
- Portrait of Sir Henry Wyatt, Hans Holbein the Younger
- Born: Henry Wyatt; 1460
- Died: 10 November 1537 (aged 76–77)
- Resting place: Milton, Kent
- Occupations: Knight, courtier, politician
- Spouse: Anne Skinner
- Children: Sir Thomas Wyatt; Henry Wyatt; Margaret Wyatt
- Parent(s): Sir Richard Wyatt; Margaret Bailiffe

Sir Henry Wyatt KB (c. 1460–1537) was an English nobleman, knight, courtier, and politician.

== Early life to 1485 ==
A younger son of a Yorkshire family, little is known of Henry Wyatt before he adopted the cause of Henry Tudor, later to become king Henry VII. Many myths and assumptions have been woven around his privations in prison as a supporter of the Tudor party's opposition to Richard III in the years 1483–85, and are still to be found recounted as facts. Some of them occur in the widely cited entry in the Dictionary of National Biography (c. 1900, available online), s.v. Sir Thomas Wyatt (poet), although the entry has since been modified by the 2004 Oxford Dictionary of National Biography.

The Wyatt family papers in the British Library contain material which provides the nearest that can be found to an authentic account of this period of his life. The relevant documents, although collated and written up in the 18th century, incorporate a self-contained narrative about Wyatt which can be dated to the mid 17th century. At this date the family was intent on reclaiming its former status after falling into disgrace with the execution and attainder of his grandson. The aim was to play up the glory days of Henry's adherence to the Tudor cause, describing him inter alia as "his Country's martyr".

It is unknown why and in what precise capacity he came to act on behalf of the exiled Tudor, or how he came to be imprisoned, or when; and most importantly, whether he was imprisoned once or in two separate occurrences. He appears to have had contacts among those close to the Scots king James III and may have been an intermediary in attempts to secure Scottish support for Henry Tudor's invasion. Another possibility is involvement with the Buckingham Revolt. Possibly he fell into the hands of "some Scottish baron with Yorkist sympathies, only to be released when Henry VII was securely on the throne, after a considerable period of cruel imprisonment, and on the promise of a huge ransom."

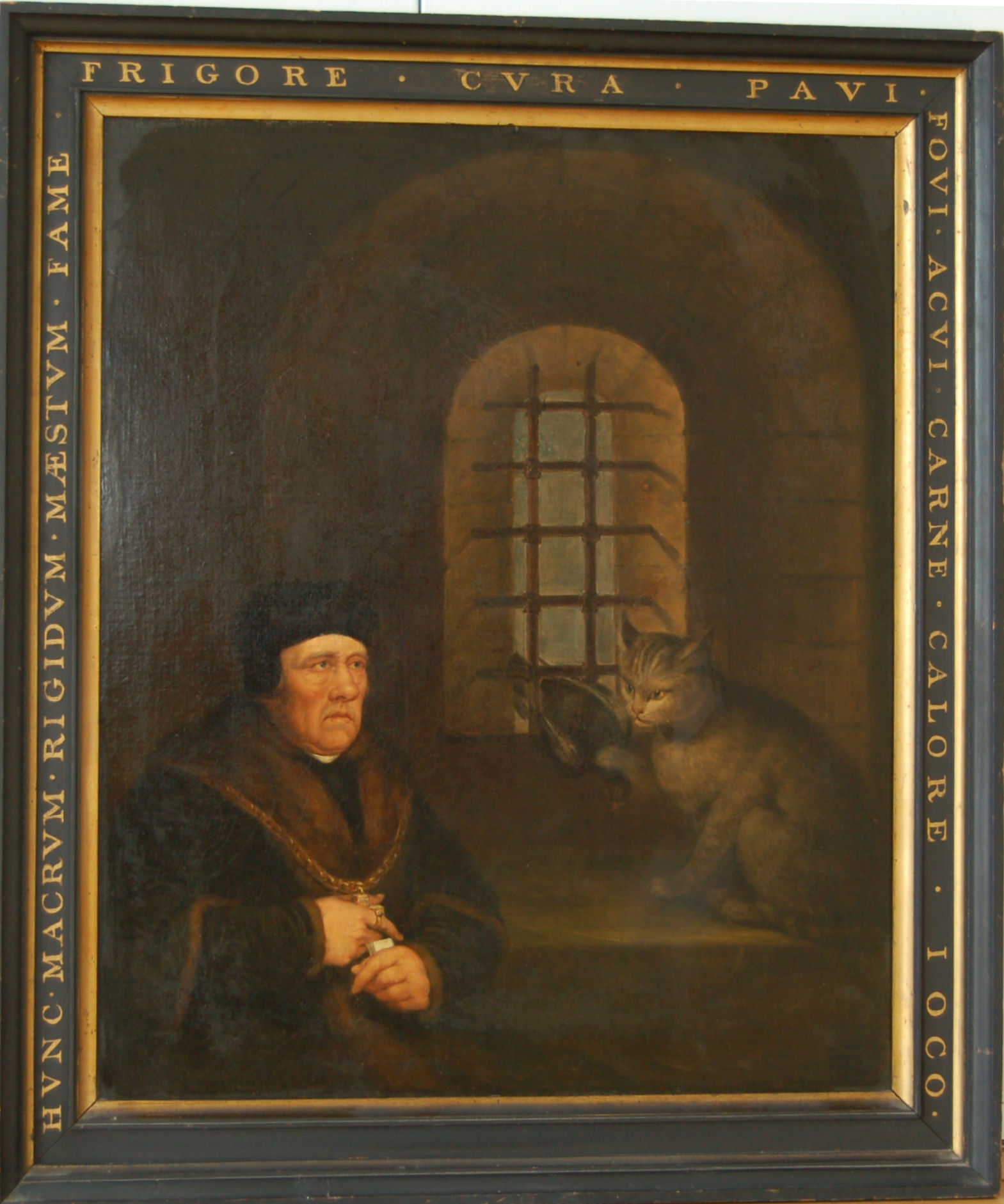
18th-century portrait of Henry Wyatt in prison

He may also have been held captive by Scots after Henry VII sent him to Carlisle, which was under Scottish attack. His possibly apocryphal exploits in the Wyatt family papers included being "imprisoned often, once in a cold and narrow Tower", where he would have starved but for the ministrations of a kindly cat who befriended him and brought him food. During his incarceration he suffered tortures involving the use of horse-barnacles and being force-fed mustard and vinegar. On one occasion "the Tyrant himself examined him", trying unsuccessfully to persuade Wyatt to change sides.

Eventually, in 1485, he was released from imprisonment, from where is not known, and received the thanks of the newly crowned Henry VII. His first recorded grant was on 11 October 1485 when he was appointed keeper of Norwich castle and gaol. A grant of Henry VIII on 22 August 1515 confirms that Wyatt still needed money to pay off his remaining Scottish ransom, although the dates of the Scottish imprisonment are not mentioned and this grant occurs after his appointment to Carlisle.

In a surviving letter written a few months after Wyatt's death, his son Thomas wrote that God had preserved his father "in prison from the handes of the tirant that could find in his hart to see him rakkid, from two yeres and more prisonment in Scotland in Irons and Stoks", and from other tribulations. Writings published by the Richard III Society have interpreted this letter as suggesting that the "tirant" was not Richard III because Richard III never set foot in Scotland during his reign, however it is not clear from Thomas's letter whether the reference to the "tirant that could find his hart to see him rakkid" and the "two yeres and more prisonment in Scotland" reference the same event or two events.

The myth and claim that he was imprisoned in the Tower of London finds its first appearance in 1702 on a stone tablet in Boxley church erected by Edwin Wyatt, Henry's great-great-great-grandson. The claim finds no support in any records including those of the Tower of London authorities. Two reasons may account for the possible error. First, the association with Henry's son and grandson, each of whom was thrown into the Tower under the Tudors. The second lies in the letter's oblique reference to being racked, which may however be figurative rather than literal. Certainly the Wyatt family papers never mention the rack, as one would have expected them to, when describing the privations he suffered, although Henry's son Thomas does mention the rack in his letter to his own son, and mentions it in a separate clause than that of the imprisonment in Scotland.

The 2004 Oxford DNB states that his support for Henry Tudor began before 1483, and that he probably participated in Buckingham's Rebellion. No evidentiary support is available for either statement, despite their plausibility. The entry continues, "Family legend has it that he was imprisoned and interrogated by Richard III himself." However, Richard III is never named by the Wyatt family. The assumption is derived from two instances of the word "tyrant" applied to Wyatt's captor, a term which in the 16th century was used to refer to Richard III but could refer to "Anyone who acts in a cruel, violent, or wicked manner". More likely it referred to the Scottish baron postulated by Conway (above). Records show that Richard III never set foot in Scotland during his reign, although if Wyatt was a captive of Richard III in the Tower of London after the Buckingham Revolt and was years later held at ransom by the Scottish during Scottish attacks on Carlisle, then Richard III's travel itinerary would not be relevant.

== Life under the Tudors ==
Under Henry VII he was appointed Clerk of the King's Jewels and Captain of Carlisle Castle. His close connections with Scotland came to the fore in his later career as Henry VII's agent in that country, for which there is ample evidence of his employment on secret and sensitive missions.

He assumed high places at court, being admitted to the privy council in 1504, and was granted arms in 1507–8 (Gules, a barnacle argent). He remained high in the royal favour. He was one of Henry VII's executors, and one of Henry VIII's guardians. He was admitted to the privy council of the new king in April 1509, and was invested a Knight of the Bath on 23 July of the same year. In 1511 he was made, jointly with Sir Thomas Boleyn, constable of Norwich Castle and on 29 July of the same year granted the estate of Maidencote, in Berkshire.

With a contingent of some 100 men he took part in the king's campaign in France in 1513, and was made knight banneret after the Battle of the Spurs, where he had served in the vanguard. In 1520 he accompanied the king to his meeting with Francis I of France at the Field of the Cloth of Gold, where he was responsible for the transportation of the gold and silver plate needed for the banquets. He was also present at the subsequent reception for Charles V, Holy Roman Emperor at Canterbury in 1522.

He was Treasurer of the King's Chamber from 1524 to 1528.

== Allington Castle ==
He purchased in 1492 Allington Castle and its estate, near Maidstone in Kent, and made the place his principal residence. Henry VIII visited him there in 1527 to meet Wolsey on his return from the continent. Wyatt remained on good terms with Sir Thomas Boleyn, who resided at Hever Castle. The proximity (about 20 miles) accounts for the meeting in a family setting of Sir Henry's poet son Thomas, and Sir Thomas's daughter Anne, the future queen, and the poetry in the courtly love tradition that resulted.

== Marriage and issue ==
About 1502 Wyatt married Anne Skinner, the daughter of John Skinner of Reigate, Surrey, by whom he had two sons and a daughter:

- Sir Thomas Wyatt, who married Elizabeth Brooke, the daughter of Thomas Brooke, 8th Baron Cobham, by Dorothy Heydon, daughter of Sir Henry Heydon and Elizabeth or Anne Boleyn, daughter of Sir Geoffrey Boleyn
- Henry Wyatt, assumed to have died an infant.
- Margaret Wyatt, who married Sir Anthony Lee (d.1549), by whom she was the mother of Queen Elizabeth's champion, Sir Henry Lee

== Death ==
Wyatt died on 10 November 1537 (Inq. post mort. 28 Hen. VIII, m. 5), and, in accordance with the directions in his will, which was proved on 21 Feb. 1537–8 (Cromwell, f. 7), was buried at Milton, near Gravesend.

== Additional reading ==
- Taylor, James D. Sir Thomas Wyatt the Younger and Wyatt's Rebellion. Algora Publishing, New York, 2013. ISBN 978-1-62894-009-1-Biography
