= Henry Lee of Ditchley =

16th-century English Queen's Champion and Master of the Armoury

Sir Henry Lee KG
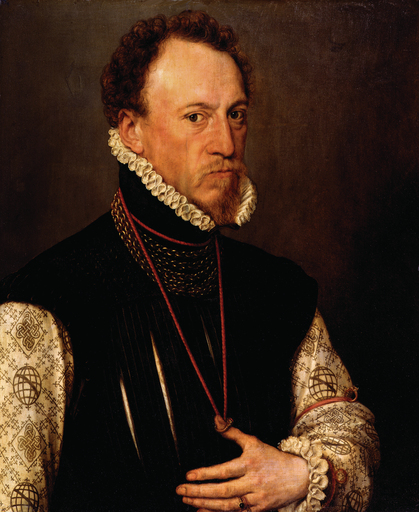
- Sir Henry Lee by Antonis Mor, 1568
- Born: March 1533
- Died: 12 February 1611 (aged 77)
- Spouse: Anne Paget
- Children: John Lee; Henry Lee; Mary Lee
- Parent(s): Sir Anthony Lee; Margaret Wyatt

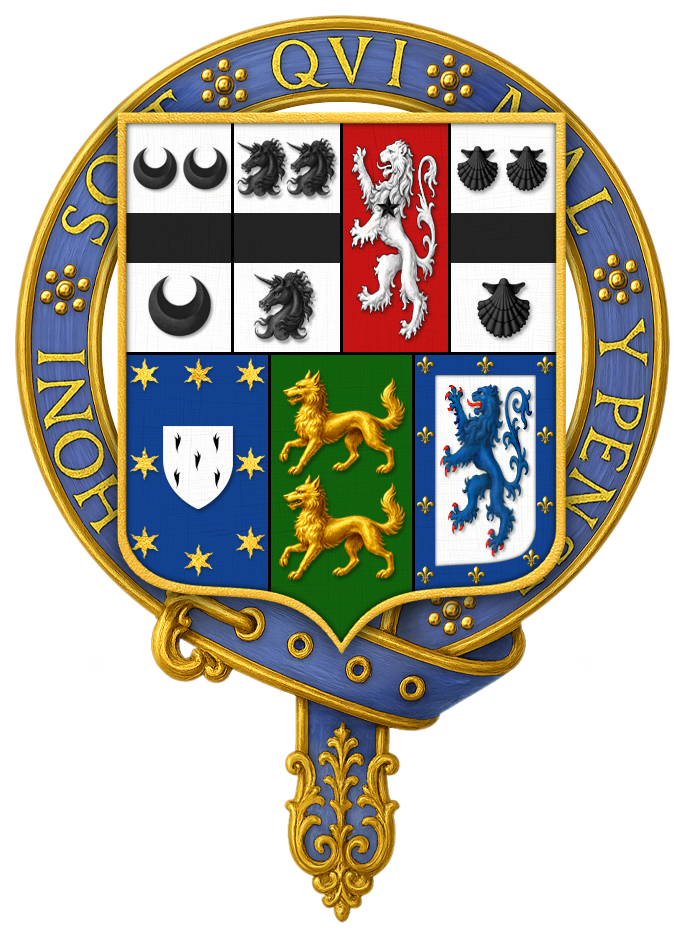
Coat of arms of Sir Henry Lee, KG

Sir Henry Lee KG (March 1533 – 12 February 1611), of Ditchley, was Queen's Champion and Master of the Armouries under Queen Elizabeth I of England.

== Family ==
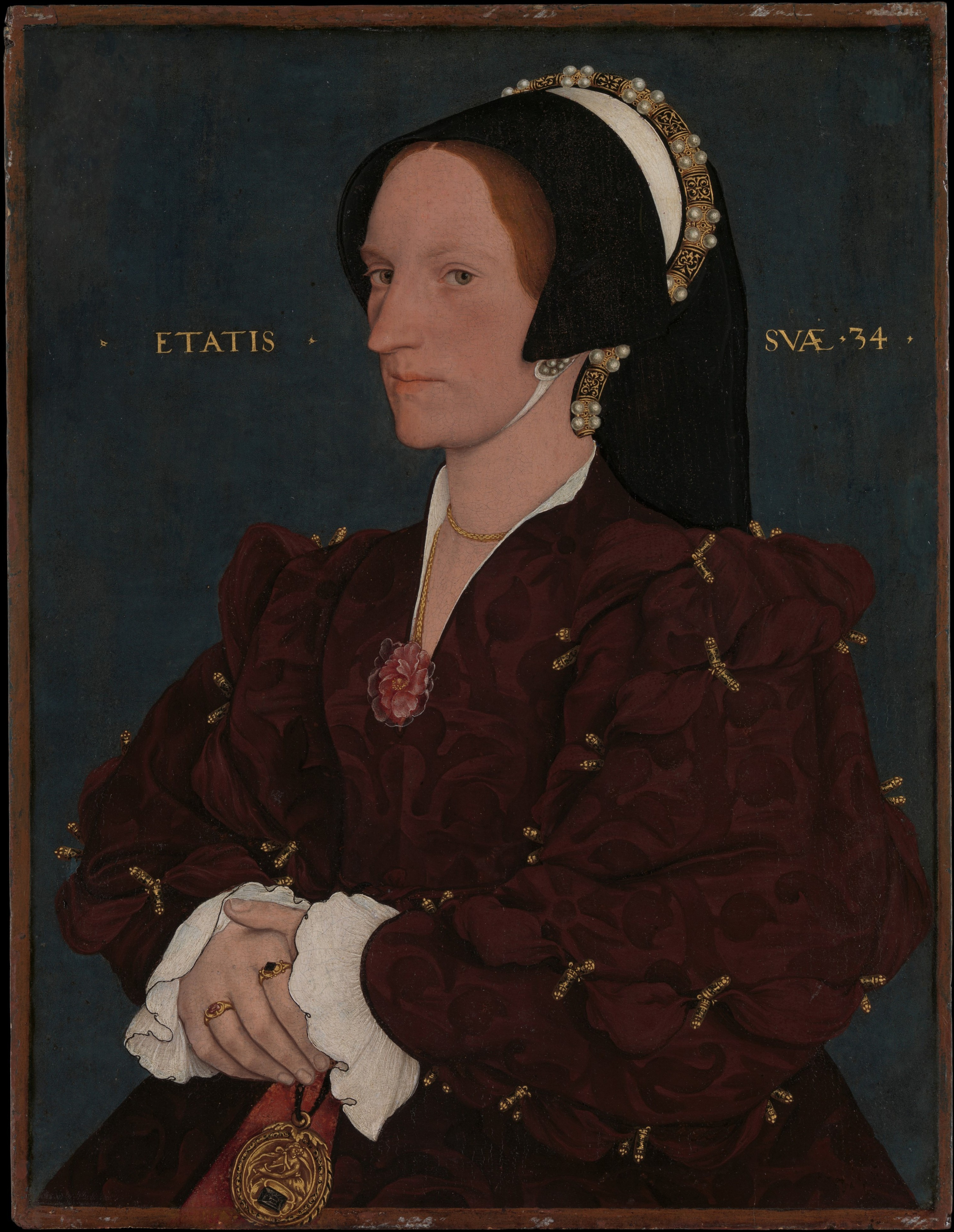
Margaret Wyatt, by Hans Holbein

Henry Lee, born in Kent in March 1533, was the grandson of Sir Robert Lee (d.1539), and the eldest son of Sir Anthony Lee (d.1549) of Quarrendon, Buckinghamshire, by his first wife, Margaret Wyatt, daughter of Sir Henry Wyatt of Allington Castle, Kent by Anne Skinner, the daughter of John Skinner of Reigate, Surrey. Margaret Wyatt was a sister of the poet Sir Thomas Wyatt. Lee had three younger brothers, Robert Lee (died c.1598), Thomas Lee, and Cromwell Lee (d.1601), who compiled an Italian-English dictionary. Lee also had an illegitimate half-brother, Sir Richard Lee (d.1608).

== Career ==
Lee became Queen Elizabeth I's champion in 1570 and was appointed Master of the Armoury in 1580, an office which he held until his death. As Queen's Champion, Lee devised the Accession Day tilts held annually on 17 November, the most important Elizabethan court festival from the 1580s. He retired as Queen's Champion in 1590, and the poems "His Golden Locks" by George Peele and "Time's Eldest Son" were set to music by John Dowland and performed at the lavish retirement pageant. He was made a Knight of the Order of the Garter in 1597 and founded Aylesbury Grammar School in 1598.

He was a Member (MP) of the Parliament of England for Buckinghamshire in 1558, 1559, 1571 and 1572.

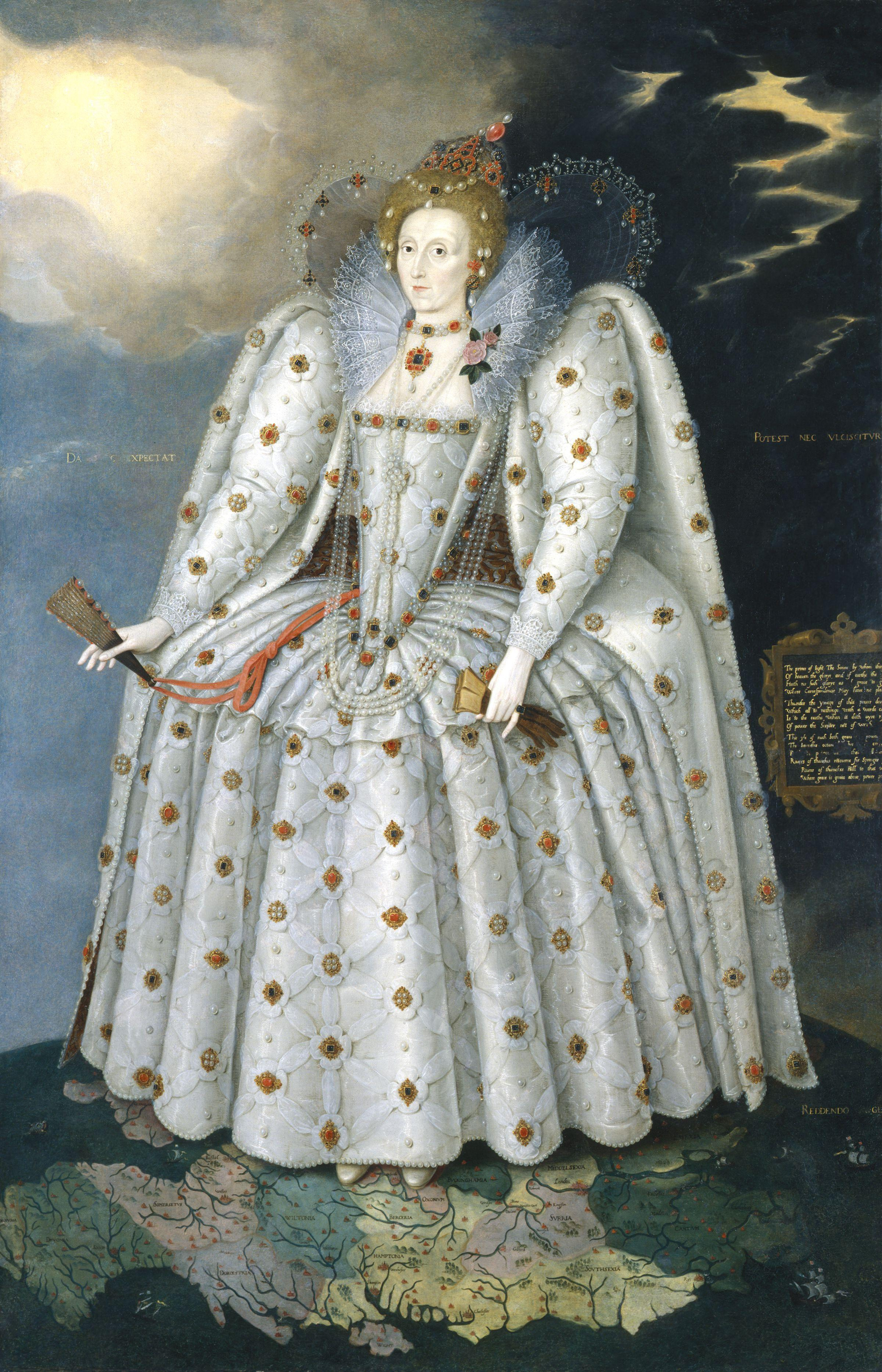
Ditchley Portrait of Elizabeth I by Marcus Gheeraerts

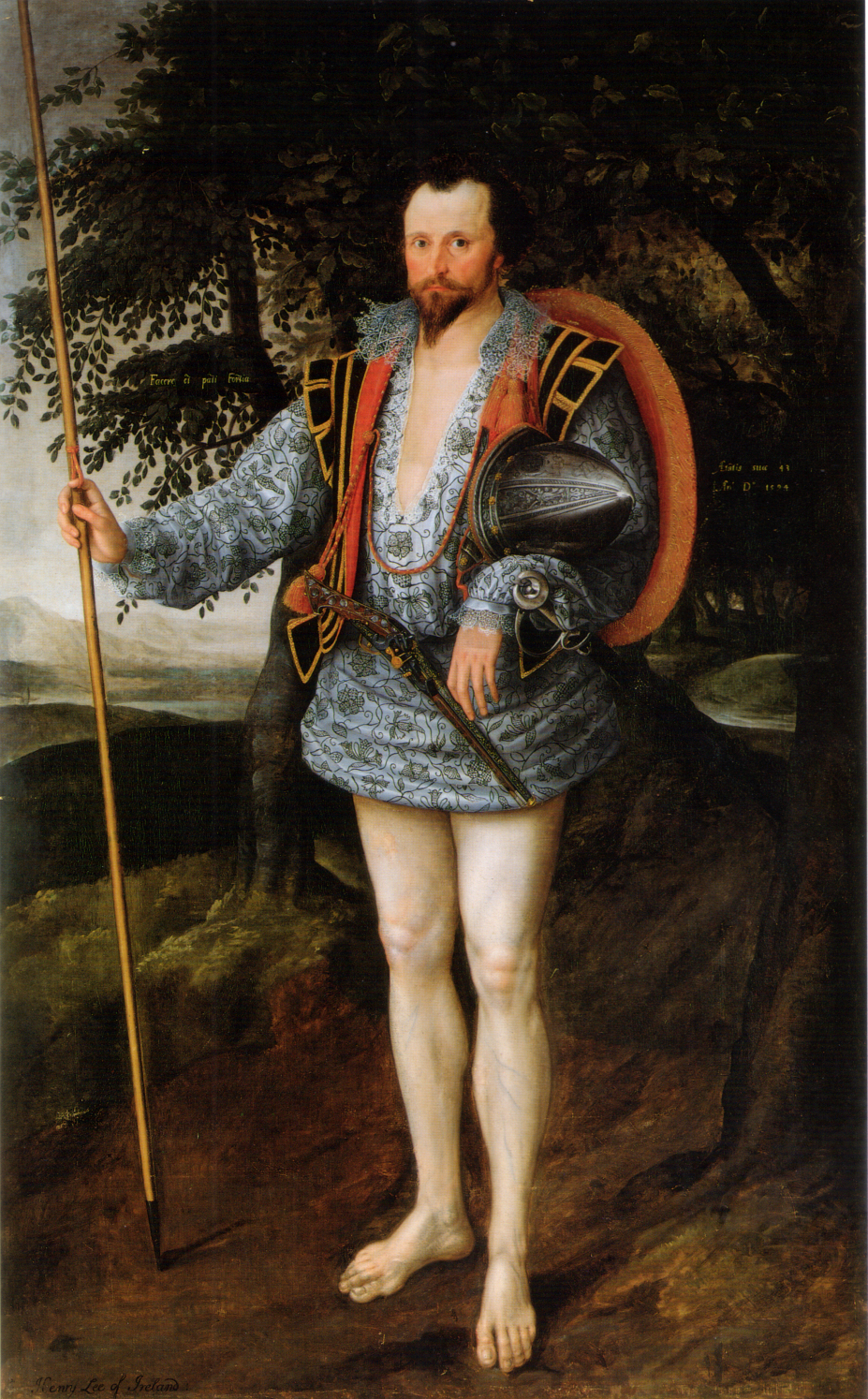
Captain Thomas Lee by Marcus Gheeraerts

Sir Henry, like most courtiers of the day, had a portrait painted by a leading artist. In Lee's picture, his sleeves are decorated with armillary spheres, a symbol of wisdom and also his device as queen's champion. His sleeves are also decorated with lovers knots which, combined with the armillary spheres can be seen to represent his love for learning (the wisdom of the armillary spheres) and for the Queen (his symbol as her champion). Lee also wears several rings tied to his arm, and has his finger through a third ring around his neck. This may represent his marriages, and the third ring, which is not quite on his finger, may represent his relationship with Anne Vavasour.

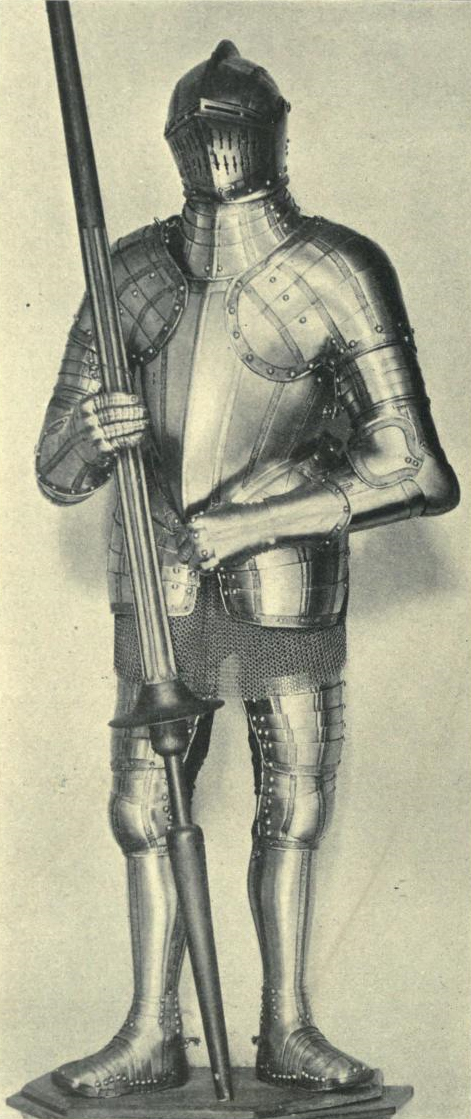
Suit of armour belonging to Sir Henry Lee

Lee built up an estate at Ditchley in Oxfordshire, from 1583. He commissioned the Ditchley Portrait of Queen Elizabeth, which shows her standing on a map of the British Isles, surveying her dominions; one foot rests near Ditchley in Oxfordshire, to commemorate her visit to Sir Henry Lee there. He was later noted for refusing to receive his monarch a second time, because of the expense.

King James VI and I and Anne of Denmark visited Ditchley on 15 September 1603 with the French ambassador and a duke, who Arbella Stuart called the "Dutchkin." Three suits of armour were made for Sir Henry Lee by the renowned Greenwich armoury, and are depicted in the album of drawings left behind by that workshop. Portions of the armour survive to the present day. One of the armours currently stands in the hall of the Armourers and Brasiers company in London.

He died on 12 February 1611.

Note to Author. The fourth Quarter of Henry's CoA should be "Argent, a fess between three leopards faces sable."

Third quarter "Gules, a lion rampant argent lingued the first, an estoile for difference, is a tribute to Randle II, 4th Earl of Chester, Henry's paterlineal ancestor.

== Marriage and children ==
Lee married, on 21 May 1554, Anne Paget (d.1590), the daughter of William Paget, 1st Baron Paget, and his wife Anne Preston, by whom he had two sons, John Lee and Henry Lee, both of whom died young, and a daughter, Mary Lee, who is said to have eloped with one John Worsley in February 1579, but died without issue, likely in 1583.

Lee's wife, Anne, was buried at Aylesbury, Buckinghamshire, on 31 December 1590. There is a monument to her in St. Mary the Virgin, Aylesbury. After her death, Lee lived openly with his mistress, Anne Vavasour, formerly one of the Queen's Ladies in Waiting. Anne of Denmark visited Lee at his lodge near Ditchley known as the "Little Rest" and talked to Anne Vavasour on 15 September 1608. A few days later the queen sent her a jewel worth more than £100, which pleased Lee to see "his sweet-heart so graced".

He was the cousin of Captain Thomas Lee, a troublesome soldier on whose behalf he allowed himself to be bound over and who was put to death in 1601 for an involvement in the treason of the 2nd Earl of Essex.

His heir and cousin, also Sir Henry Lee, became 1st Baronet Lee of Quarendon.
