= Elizabeth Brooke (1503–1560) =

Wife of Thomas Wyatt, the poet, and the mother of Thomas Wyatt the younger

Elizabeth Brooke Lady Wyatt Lady Warner
- Born: 1503
- Died: August 1560 (aged 56–57)
- Resting place: Tower of London
- Occupation: Wife of poet Thomas Wyatt
- Spouse(s): Sir Thomas Wyatt; Edward Warner
- Children: Thomas Wyatt; Edward; Thomas; Henry
- Parent(s): Thomas Brooke, 8th Baron Cobham; Dorothy Heydon

Elizabeth Brooke, Lady Wyatt (1503–1560) was the wife of Thomas Wyatt, the poet, and the mother of Thomas Wyatt the younger who led Wyatt's Rebellion against Mary I. Her parents were Thomas Brooke, 8th Baron Cobham and Dorothy Heydon, the daughter of Henry Heydon. She was the sister of George Brooke, 9th Baron Cobham and was considered a possible candidate for the sixth wife of Henry VIII of England.

== Marriage and issue ==
Elizabeth married twice.

=== First Marriage ===
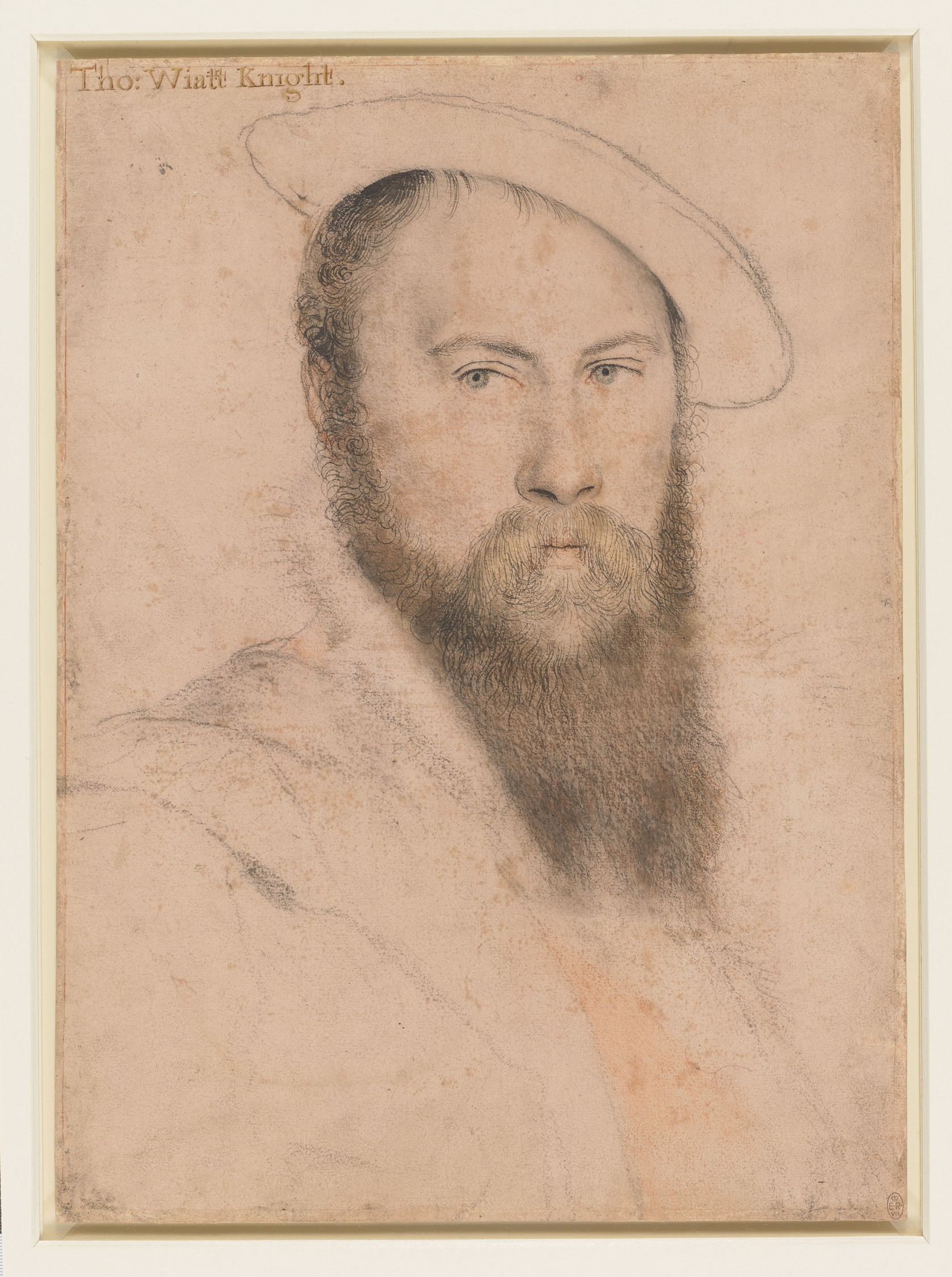
Sir Thomas Wyatt (1503–1542) Hans Holbein the Younger

In 1520, Elizabeth married Thomas Wyatt and a year later, had a son:

- Thomas (1521–1554), who led an unsuccessful rebellion against Mary I in 1554. The aim of the rebellion was to replace the Catholic Queen Mary with her Protestant half-sister, Elizabeth.
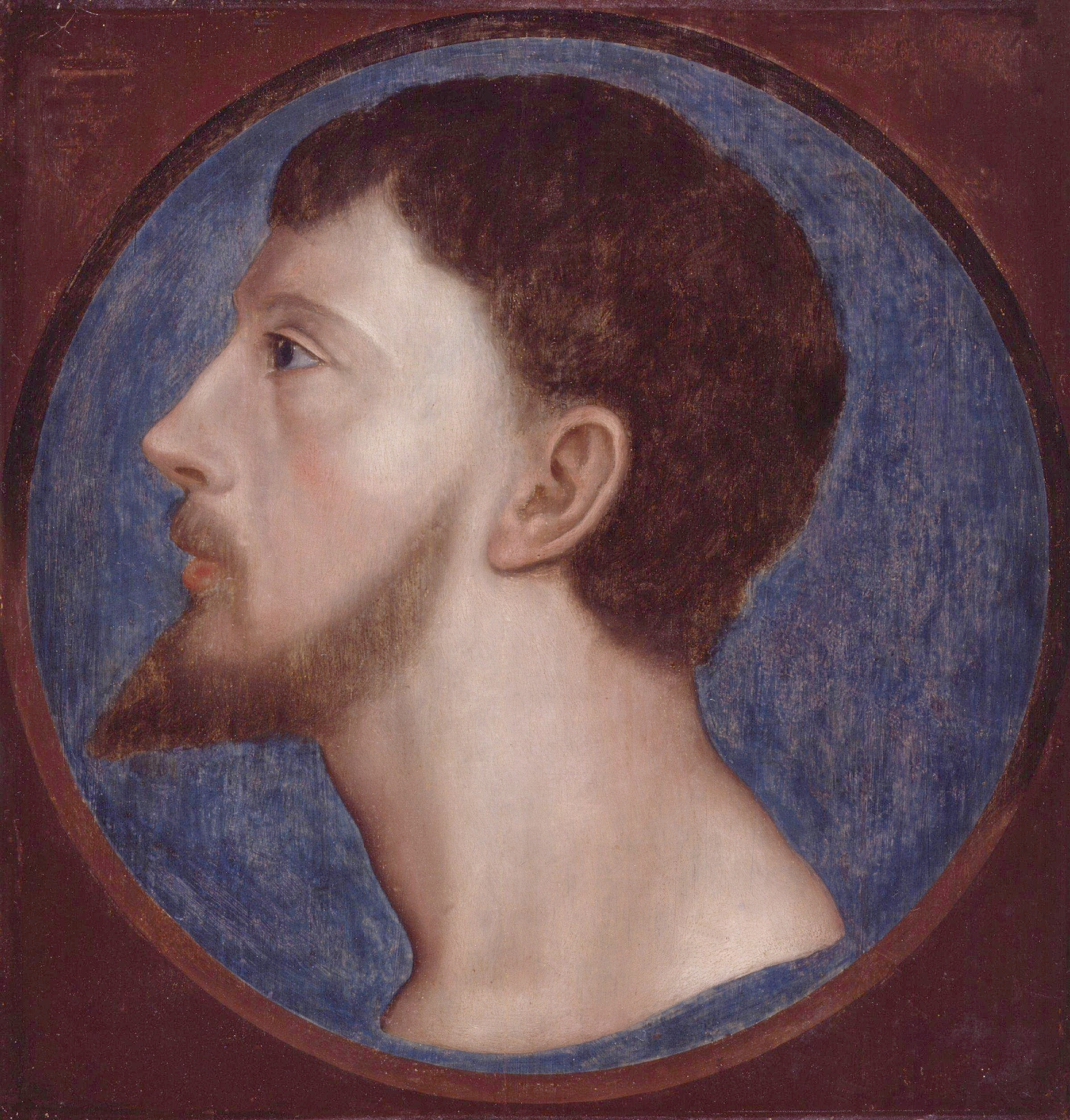
  Thomas Wyatt (1521–1554)

Early in the marriage, marital difficulties arose, with Wyatt claiming they were "chiefly" her fault. He repudiated her as an adulteress, although there is no record linking her with any specific man. Elizabeth separated from Thomas Wyatt in 1526 and he supported her until around 1537, when he refused to do so any longer and sent her to live with her brother, Lord Cobham. In that same year, Lord Cobham attempted to force Wyatt to continue his financial support. Wyatt refused. It wasn't until 1541, when Wyatt, accused of treason, was arrested and his properties confiscated, that the Brooke family was able to force a reconciliation as a condition for Wyatt’s pardon.

In a letter to Charles V, the imperial ambassador, Eustace Chapuys wrote that Wyatt had been released from the Tower at the request of Catherine Howard. Chapuys noted that the king had imposed two conditions; that Wyatt "confess his guilt" and that "he should take back his wife from whom he had been separated upwards of 15 years, on pain of death if he be untrue to her henceforth." There is no evidence that this provision was ever enforced or existed. After pursuing Anne Boleyn, before her relationship with the king, Wyatt had begun a long-term affair with Elizabeth Darrell and he continued his association with his mistress.

On 14 February 1542, the night after Catherine Howard had been condemned to death for adultery, Henry VIII held a dinner for many men and women. The king was said to have paid great attention to Elizabeth and to Anne Basset and both were thought to be possible choices for his sixth wife. In early 1542, more than a year before Wyatt’s death, Elizabeth Brooke's name appeared in Spanish dispatches as one of three ladies in whom Henry VIII was said to be interested as a possible sixth wife.

The imperial ambassador, Chapuys, wrote that the lady for whom the king "showed the greatest regard was a sister of Lord Cobham, whom Wyatt, some time ago, divorced for adultery. She is a pretty young creature, with wit enough to do as badly as the others if she were to try." It would appear that the ambassador was mistaken, as at the time, Elizabeth Brooke was nearly forty years old. Perhaps Elizabeth Brooke had been confused with her beautiful young niece, Elisabeth Brooke, the eldest daughter of George Brooke, 9th Baron Cobham, who married William Parr, 1st Marquess of Northampton. Elisabeth Brooke, Lord Cobham’s daughter, may have been at court on this occasion, since she was definitely there the following year. She would have been nearly sixteen in January 1542 and in later years was accounted one of the most beautiful women of her time. More important to a king who had just rid himself of a wife (Catherine Howard) who had committed adultery, this second Elisabeth had a spotless reputation.

=== Second marriage ===
Following Wyatt’s death, Elizabeth Brooke married Edward Warner (1511–1565), of Polstead Hall and Plumstead, Norfolk, Lord Lieutenant of the Tower of London. The couple had three sons:

- Edward, who died in infancy
- Thomas
- Henry

Warner was removed from his position on July 28, 1553, at the start of the reign of Mary I, and was arrested on suspicion of treason the following January at his house in Carter Lane when Thomas Wyatt the younger rebelled against the Crown. Warner was held for nearly a year. Elizabeth’s son was executed. Edward, the son she had with Warner, died young. Two other sons died in infancy. The family fortunes were restored under Elizabeth I and Warner reclaimed his post at the Tower of London. His wife died there in August 1560 and was buried within its precincts.

== Ancestry ==
Ancestors of Elizabeth Brooke (1503–1560)

16. Thomas Brooke
8. Edward Brooke, 6th Baron Cobham
17. Joan Braybrooke
4. John Brooke, 7th Baron Cobham
18. James Touchet, 5th Baron Audley
9. Elizabeth Touchet
19. Margaret Roos
2. Thomas Brooke, 8th Baron Cobham
20. Ralph de Neville, 1st Earl of Westmorland
10. Edward Neville, 3rd Baron Bergavenny
21. Joan Beaufort, Countess of Westmorland
5. Margaret Nevill
22. Robert Howard
11. Katherine Howard
23. Margaret de Mowbray
1. Elizabeth Brooke
24. William Heydon
12. John Heydon (died 1479)
25. Joan Longford
6. Henry Heydon
26. Edmund Winter
13. Eleanor Winter
27. Oliva Hampton
3. Dorothy Heydon
28. Geoffrey Boleyn
14. Geoffrey Boleyn
29. Alice Bracton
7. Anne Boleyn
30. Thomas Hoo, Baron Hoo and Hastings
15. Anne Hastings
31. Elizabeth Wychingham

== Sources ==
- Hart, Kelly (2009). The Mistresses of Henry VIII (First ed.). The History Press. p. 197. ISBN 978-0-7524-4835-0.
- Hervey, Walter; et al. (1891). Rye, Walter (ed.). The Visitacion of Norfolk, made and taken by William Hervey, Clarencieux King of Arms, Anno 1563...(The Publications of the Harleian Society, vol. xxxii). London.
- Letters and Papers, Foreign and Domestic, Henry VIII, Volume 16: 1540–1541 (1898). British-history.ac.uk.
- Philipot, John (1898). Hovenden (ed.). The Visitation of Kent, Taken in the Years 1619–1621, (The Publications of the Harleian Society, vol. xlii). London: Harleian Society.
- "Preface". Letters and Papers, Foreign and Domestic, Henry VIII, Volume 16: 1540–1541 (1898), pp. I-LV. British-history.ac.uk.
- Richardson, Douglas (2011). Everingham, Kimball G. (ed.). Magna Carta Ancestry: A Study in Colonial and Medieval Families. Vol. IV (2nd ed.). Salt Lake City. ISBN 978-1460992708.
- Shulman, Nicola (2012). Graven With Diamonds: The Many Lives of Thomas Wyatt: Courtier, Poet, Assassin, Spy in the Court of Henry VIII (Paperback). Short Books. ISBN 9781780720883.
- Thomson, Patricia (1964). Sir Thomas Wyatt and His Background. London: Routledge.
