= Edward Warner (1511–1565) =

English politician

Sir Edward Warner (1511 – 7 November 1565) was an English politician, and Lieutenant of the Tower of London. He was an MP for Grantham in 1545, 1547, March 1553 and October 1553, for Great Grimsby in 1559, and Norfolk in 1563.

== Family ==
Warner was the younger son of Henry Warner (d. 1519) of Besthorpe and Mary, daughter of John Blennerhassett of Frenze. He was the brother of Robert Warner. He married first Elizabeth (d. 1560), daughter of Thomas Brooke, 8th Lord Cobham, widow of Sir Thomas Wyatt I (d. 1542) of Allington Castle, Kent. They had three sons. She died in August 1560 and was buried in the Tower. His second wife, Audrey (d. 16 July 1581), daughter and heiress of William Hare of Beeston, Norfolk, was the widow of Thomas Hobart of Plumstead.

== Life ==
In 1549, Warner took part in the defence of Norwich against Robert Kett, acting as Marshal of the field under William Parr, Marquis of Northampton. In March 1550/51, he received a license from the king for himself and his wife to eat flesh and white meats during Lent and other fasting days for the rest of his life. In October 1552, he was appointed Lieutenant of the Tower in succession to Arthur Darcy.

Warner was removed, however, on 28 July 1553, shortly after Queen Mary I's accession, and John Brydges appointed in his place. His dismissal was probably due to his sympathy with the claims of Lady Jane Grey. His disgrace increased his discontent, and he listened to the outspoken complaints of his friend Nicholas Throckmorton, who bitterly censured the ecclesiastical changes which Mary had introduced. Warner's disposition was known, and on the outbreak of Thomas Wyatt's rebellion, in which his father-in-law, Lord Cobham, was supposed to be implicated, he was promptly arrested on suspicion on 25 January 1553/4 with the Marquis of Northampton, at his own house by Carter Lane, and the next day was committed to the Tower. His punishment was not severe; his wife was permitted to enjoy his revenues during his imprisonment, and on 18 January 1554/5 he was released.

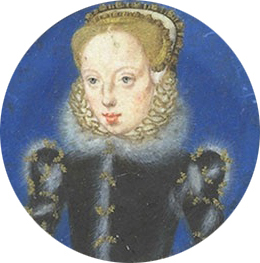
Warner was entrusted with the custody of Lady Katherine Grey in 1561

In the early part of 1558 Warner was employed under Thomas Tresham (d. 1559) on a mission in the Isle of Wight. On the accession of Elizabeth I he was promptly reappointed Lieutenant of the Tower, and in September 1559 he was present at the obsequies of Henry II of France that was celebrated in London, and took part in the procession in St. Paul's. In February 1560 he received a grant of the mastership of the hospital of St. Katherine by the Tower, with the stewardship of the manor of East Smithfield on the surrender of Francis Mallett.

In 1561 Warner was entrusted with the custody of Lady Katherine Grey, Countess of Hertford, who had fallen into disgrace on the disclosure of her marriage with the Earl of Hertford. He had instructions to the effect that "many persons of high rank were known to have been privy to the marriage", and injunctions to urge Lady Katherine to a full confession of the truth. On 22 August, however, he wrote to Elizabeth that he had questioned Lady Katherine, but she had confessed nothing. He afterwards, in pity to his captive, allowed her husband to visit her; the result was the birth of a second child, an occurrence which redoubled Elizabeth's anger.

Warner was also entrusted the custody of the bishops deposed for declining to recognise Elizabeth's supremacy. In 1563 he sat in Parliament for the county of Norfolk. In 1565 he proceeded to the Netherlands, apparently to inquire into the condition of the English trade there, and on 3 November was nominated as a commissioner for Norfolk to carry out measures for repressing piracy and other disorders on the sea coasts. He died without any children on 7 November 1565.

== Gains ==
On 14 February 1543/4 Warner received the reversionary of Polstead Hall, Norfolk, which was confirmed to him on 14 October 1553. He also benefited largely by the dissolution of the monasteries, receiving grants of ecclesiastical land both from Henry VIII and from Edward VI. On 22 January 1544/5 he was returned to Parliament for the borough of Grantham, a seat which he also held in the parliaments of 1547 and 1553. In December 1546 he bore witness against the Duke of Norfolk's son, Lord Surrey, informing William Paget, the secretary of state, that he had heard him hint at the possibility of Norfolk's succeeding Henry VIII. In recompense he obtained the grant of the Duke's lands at Castleacre, Norfolk.
