= Thomas Brooke, 8th Baron Cobham =

English peer (died 1529)

Arms of Brooke, Baron Cobham "of Kent": Gules, on a chevron argent a lion rampant sable crowned or

Thomas Brooke, 8th Baron Cobham (died 19 July 1529), lord of the Manor of Cobham, Kent, was an English peer.

Thomas Brooke was the son and heir of Sir John Brooke, 7th Baron Cobham (d. 1512) and Margaret Neville (d. 1506), daughter of Edward Neville, 3rd Baron Bergavenny, and his second wife, Katherine Howard.

== Career ==
Thomas took part in the wars with France and was at the Siege of Tournay in 1513, and fought at the Battle of the Spurs on 16 August 1513.

He was made Knight Banneret by King Henry VIII in 1514, and attended the Field of the Cloth of Gold in 1520.

He was summoned to Parliament from 1514 to 1523.

In 1521 he was one of the twelve Barons for the trial of the Duke of Buckingham.

== Family ==
Thomas Brooke married Dorothy Heydon, daughter of Sir Henry Heydon of Baconsthorpe and Anne, daughter of Sir Geoffrey Boleyn and Anne Hoo. They had seven sons and six daughters. His daughter Elizabeth Brooke married Sir Thomas Wyatt.

He was twice widowed. He married secondly Elizabeth Calthorpe (d.1517), the daughter of Sir Philip Calthorpe of Burnham Thorpe, Norfolk, widow of Sir Robert Southwell (d. 31 March 1514) and thirdly Elizabeth Hart, and had no issue from them. (Note: His second wife is often called Elizabeth or Dorothy 'Fowthewel'. This is a misreading of Sowthewel (Southwell), from Weever's transcript of Thomas Brooke's epitaph. The transcription as printed says 'Dorotheam Fowthewel viduam, que obiit sine exitu'. Some sources also call her 'Ursula'. As Nina Green points out, it seems likely that this is a confusion with Sir Robert Southwell’s first wife, Ursula Bohun.)

Elizabeth Calthorpe's and Sir Robert Southwell had been married by settlement of 1506/7. (Note: Richardson takes '27th Henry' to be a mistake. As, he puts it: "The date of the settlement given above as 27th Henry VII is impossible, as King Henry only ruled 24 years." However, this appears to be a counting of regnal years used by some, to mean a regnal year spanning parts of the years 1506 and 1507, perhaps in order to discount the reign of Richard III of England.) After his death, together with Sir Robert's brother-in-law William Wootton, she was entrusted the wardship of his ten-year-old nephew and heir, Sir Richard Southwell. After her death, Thomas Wyndham acquired the wardship.

Thomas Brooke died on 19 July 1529 and was buried at St. Mary Magdalene New Churchyard, Cobham, Kent.

His epitaph was recorded by Weever:

Orate pro anima Tho' Broke militis Domini de Cobham consanguinei et heredis Richardi Beauchampe militis, qui quidem Thomas cepit in uxorem Dorotheam, filiam Henrici Heydon militis; et habuerunt exitum intereos, septem filios, et sex filias, et predicta Dorothea obiit . . . . et predictus Thomas cepit in uxorem Dorotheam Sowthewel viduam, que obiit sine exitu; et postea cepit in uxorem Elizabetham Harte et habuerunt nullum exitum inter eos; qui quidem Thomas obiit 19 Julii, 1529.

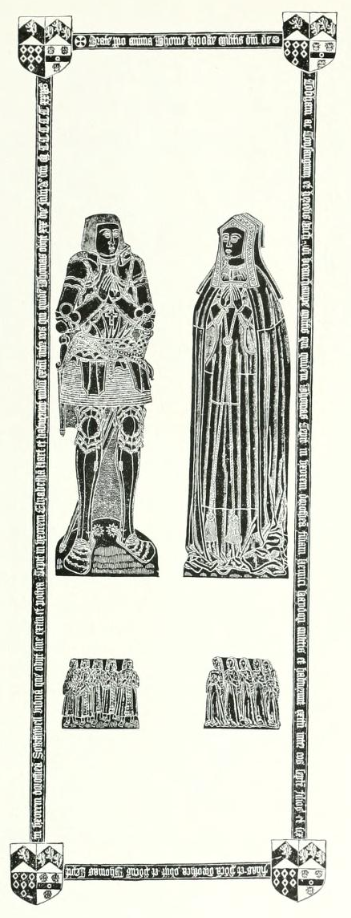
Thomas Brooke, Lord Cobham, and Dorothy Heydon, his wife – Cobham Church

He is in the elaborate armour of the period, with skirt of mail, and broad-toed sabbatons, a chain with dependant cross suspended from the neck, an ornament found on many effigies about this date. The lady wears the pedimental head-dress of that era. The children are in two groups below. Arms, four shields at the corners, each charged alike with Brook, Cobham, Braybroke, and De la Pole—Azure, a fess between three leopards heads Or, an annulet for difference, being the bearings assigned to the younger branch of De la Pole.

Of his thirteen children, John, the eldest son, died in his father's lifetime; George, who became his heir, Thomas, William, and Edward. Of his daughters, Margaret was married to Sir John Fogge of Repton; Faith, to William Ockenden, Gentleman Porter of Calais; and Elizabeth, to Sir Thomas Wyatt of Allington Castle in Kent and afterward to Sir Edward Warner.

He was succeeded by his son, George Brooke, 9th Baron Cobham.
