= Thomas Wyatt the Younger =

English rebel leader during the reign of Queen Mary I (1521–1554)

Sir Thomas Wyatt
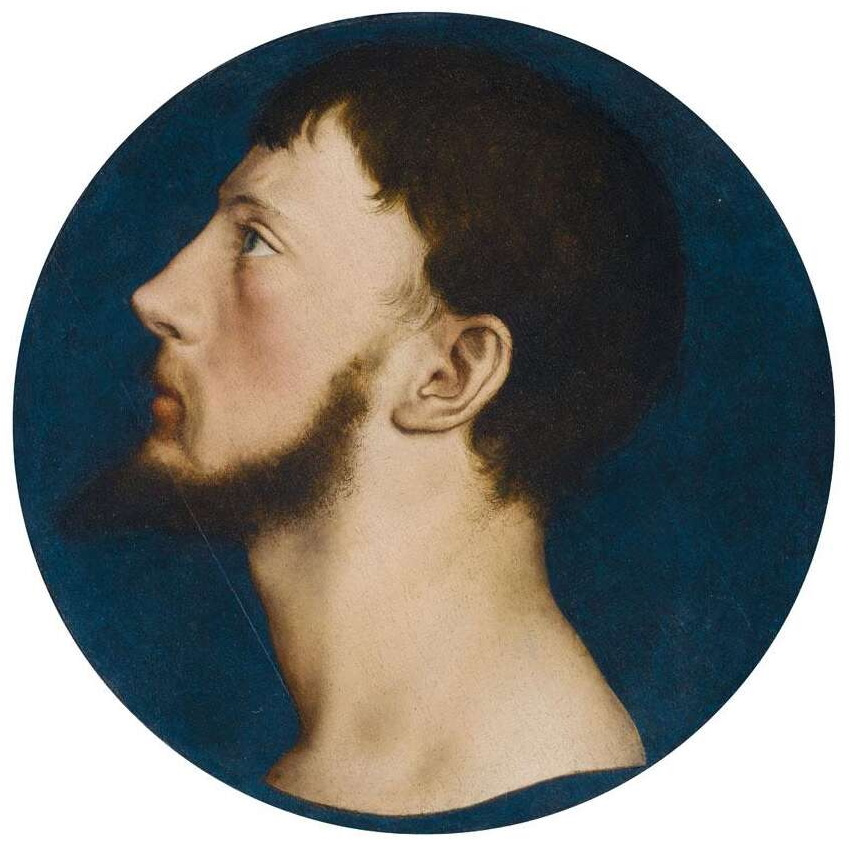
- Portrait of Thomas Wyatt the Younger circa 1540–42
- Born: Thomas Wyatt the younger 10 September 1521; Chatham, Kent, England
- Died: 11 April 1554 (aged 32); Tower Hill, London, England
- Burial place: St Mary the Virgin and All Saints Churchyard, Boxley, Kent
- Occupations: Politician and rebel leader
- Spouse: Jane Haute
- Children: Francis; George; Richard; Charles; Arthur; Henry; Joyce; Ursula; Anne; Jane
- Parent(s): Sir Thomas Wyatt; Elizabeth Brooke

Sir Thomas Wyatt the Younger (10 September 1521 – 11 April 1554) was an English politician and rebel leader during the reign of Queen Mary I; his rising is traditionally called "Wyatt's rebellion". He was the son of the English poet and ambassador Sir Thomas Wyatt.

== Origins ==
He was the son of the poet Sir Thomas Wyatt who introduced the sonnet into English literature. His mother was Elizabeth Brooke, a daughter of Thomas Brooke, 8th Baron Cobham, of Cobham Hall and Cooling Castle both in Kent, by his wife, Dorothy Heydon, a daughter of Sir Henry Heydon and Elizabeth (or Anne) Boleyn, a daughter of Sir Geoffrey Boleyn. He was the grandson of Sir Henry Wyatt and Anne Skinner, a daughter of John Skinner of Reigate, Surrey.

== Youth ==
Born the eldest of four boys, Thomas Wyatt the Younger was raised a Roman Catholic. His godfather, Thomas Howard, 3rd Duke of Norfolk had a significant influence on Wyatt's upbringing. Throughout his childhood, Thomas accompanied his father on a delegation to Spain where the Inquisition began. Subsequently, at the young age of sixteen, Thomas was married to Jane Haute.

At his father's death in 1542, Thomas inherited Allington Castle and Boxley Abbey in Kent, but found both estates encumbered by debt. Further financial difficulties arose from the fact that, having been unfaithful to his wife (rumour had it that they were both unfaithful), the elder Wyatt separated from her. He had a child named Francis Darrell, whose mother was Elizabeth Darrell, an unmarried daughter of Sir Edward Darrell of Littlecote House in Wiltshire. The elder Sir Thomas left Elizabeth property in Dorset, thus diminishing his son's inheritance. Nonetheless, the younger Thomas was evidently on friendly terms with his half-brother Francis, to whom he made a gift of his manor of Tarrant.

He was described as a young man of somewhat wild and impulsive temperament, and in 1543, along with other young noblemen, including Henry Howard, Earl of Surrey, he was in trouble with the authorities for causing a serious public disturbance in London. In the autumn of 1543, Wyatt and Surrey joined a group of volunteers to take part in the Siege of Landrecies. Wyatt established himself as a prominent figure in the military and was praised by the professional soldier Thomas Churchyard. Next, Wyatt took part in the Siege of Boulogne with a responsible command.

In 1547, he was elected Member of Parliament for Kent. In 1550, he was given the title of commissioner to delimit the English frontier in France but became ill and incapable of performing his duty. Later, Wyatt claimed to have assisted Queen Mary I against the Duke of Northumberland when the Duke claimed the throne for his daughter-in-law, Lady Jane Grey.

== Wyatt's Rebellion ==
Stemming from experiences with the Spanish Inquisition while accompanying his father, Wyatt developed an aversion to the Spanish government, which greatly affected him when he learned of Queen Mary's decision to marry Philip of Spain. Thomas Wyatt viewed this decision as an injustice to the nation. According to Wyatt, he never planned on protesting against the Queen's marriage until he was approached by Edward Courtenay, 1st Earl of Devon, who wished to prevent the Queen's plan.

When the official marriage announcement was published on 15 January 1554, Wyatt and friends joined at Allington Castle to discuss plans of resistance. After several instigators were arrested, Wyatt became the leader of the rebellion. He then published a proclamation at Maidstone stating that his plan had been approved by "dyvers of the best shire". People were told to secure the advancements of "liberty and commonwealth" which were being threatened by "the Queen's determinate pleasure to marry with a stranger".

Wyatt proved himself to be a responsible leader, earning the praise of the French ambassador, Antoine de Noailles. Soon, Wyatt was responsible for commanding 1,500 men. He set up his command headquarters in Rochester on 26 January.

Shortly after he had established his headquarters, Queen Mary was informed of Wyatt's plan. The Queen offered a pardon to followers of Wyatt who retreated peacefully to their homes within twenty-four hours. Despite this, Thomas Wyatt encouraged his followers to stay by falsely announcing imminent support from France and victorious uprisings in other areas. He was given a surprising advantage when the government instructed the Duke of Norfolk to approach Wyatt and his forces. The Duke's forces were inferior to Wyatt and the rebels. When the Duke came into contact with Wyatt, many of his own men joined the rebellion, which led the Duke to flee to Gravesend.

Following these events, Wyatt and the four thousand men who accompanied him marched through Gravesend and Dartford to Blackheath in January 1553/54. Stow (1598) wrote: "in the year 1553, the 3rd February, Sir Thomas Wyat and the Kentish men marched from Depeford towards London... the draw-bridge was cut down, and the bridge gates shut."

The government addressed this issue with great seriousness. In an effort to gain time, the government offered Wyatt an opportunity to establish demands; however, this was only a formality. By this point, Wyatt had been deemed a disloyal adversary in the eyes of the monarchy. On 2 February 1554, over twenty thousand men volunteered to aid the Queen as defenders against Wyatt and his troops. In addition to these precautions, other security measures were also taken. The court and the Tower of London were under especially heavy guard. Furthermore, a lucrative reward was offered in exchange for Wyatt's capture: a valuable sum of land would be awarded to anyone who handed Wyatt over as a captive.

During the negotiation, Wyatt had insisted that the Tower should be surrendered to him, and the queen put in his charge. Although the reformers in London had at first been in sympathy with him, these demands caused a negative reaction. Upon entering Southwark, Wyatt and his companions soon discovered the high-security measures that had been implemented, and that London Bridge was fortified. As a result, many of his followers abandoned him, forcing him to leave Southwark. He instead headed towards Kingston-on-Thames, with new plans to surprise Ludgate and intentions to capture the Queen's refuge in St James's Palace. The government soon found out about his strategy, and responded by allowing him to progress into the city, only to corner him from all sides. After several skirmishes along the way, with the numbers of his followers dwindling continually, Wyatt eventually admitted defeat. He was arrested and taken to the Tower of London. On 15 March, after a trial which was little more than a formality, he was sentenced to death for high treason. Sentence was delayed in hopes that he would place some blame on Mary's half-sister Elizabeth, but he did not confess enough to put her in danger.

== Execution ==
On 11 April 1554, the scheduled date of his execution, Wyatt asked permission of John Brydges, 1st Baron Chandos, the Lieutenant of the Tower of London, to speak to Edward Courtenay, the Earl of Devon.

During their half-hour-long meeting, Wyatt knelt down before Courtenay and begged him "to confess the truth of himself", as Wyatt believed Courtenay was the original instigator of the crime. However, when on the scaffold, Wyatt confessed his own blame and was determined to exculpate Princess Elizabeth and Courtenay. After Wyatt was beheaded, his body was further punished according to the standards of treason. His head, before it was stolen on 17 April, was hung from a gallows. His limbs were then circulated among towns and also hung up for display.

== Marriage and issue ==
In 1537, Wyatt married Jane Haute, the daughter of Sir William Haute (died 1539) of Bishopsbourne, Kent, by Mary, the daughter of Sir Richard Guildford. They had six sons, George, Francis, Richard, Charles, Arthur and Henry, and four daughters, Joyce, Ursula, Anne, and Jane.

Three of their children married and continued the lineage. Anne married Roger Twysden, whose grandson was Sir Roger Twysden. Sir Roger inherited Wyatt the Younger's son George Wyatt's manuscript on Anne Boleyn's life, entitled Extracts from the Life of Queen Anne Boleigne, by George Wyat. Written at the close of the XVIth century.

His estates were afterwards partly restored to his son, George. George's son, Sir Francis Wyatt (died 1644), was governor of Virginia in 1621–26 and 1639–42.

A great-grandson of note was explorer and interpreter, Captain Henry Fleete of Maryland and Virginia.

== In literature ==
Sir Thomas Wyatt the Younger is a central character in the history play Sir Thomas Wyatt (published in 1607) by John Webster and Thomas Dekker.
