= George Wyatt (writer) =

English writer and politician (1553–1624)

George Wyatt (c. January 1554 – c. August 1624) of Boxley Abbey, Kent, and born at Allington Castle, was an English writer and politician. He was the first biographer of Henry VIII's second queen, Anne Boleyn. His grandfather, Sir Thomas Wyatt the Elder, was a famous poet and diplomat. He was the son of Thomas Wyatt the Younger, who led the unsuccessful Wyatt's Rebellion in 1554, and his wife Jane Haute.

He married Jane Finch (1562–1644), daughter of Sir Thomas Finch, 8 October 1582, at Eastwell, Kent. Their children included Sir Francis Wyatt (c. 1588–1644), Governor of Virginia (1621–1626 and 1639–1642), and Reverend Haute Wyatt (1594–1638), who was minister at Jamestown, Virginia, during his brother's first administration, and vicar at Boxley, Kent, from 1632 until his death in 1638.
