= Elizabeth Darrell =

Elizabeth Darrell may refer to:

- Elizabeth Darrell (courtier), mistress of the poet Sir Thomas Wyatt
- Elizabeth Darrell (née de Calstone), owner of Littlecote House
- Elizabeth Darrell, first wife of John Seymour (died 1491), and paternal grandmother of Queen Jane Seymour
