= Francis Wyatt =

Royal governor of Virginia

Governor-General Sir Francis Wyatt
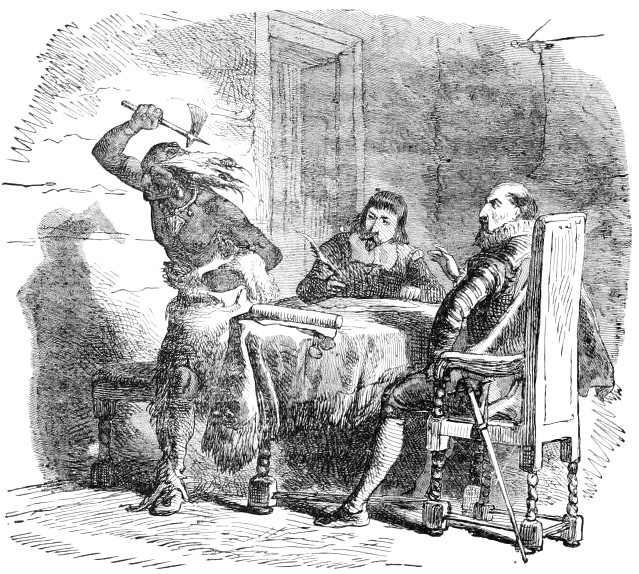
- Apocryphal depiction of Opechancanough (left) and Francis Wyatt (right), c. 1621
- Born: 1588; Boxley, Kent
- Died: 1644 (aged 55–56)
- Resting place: Boxley Abbey
- Other names: Francis Wyate, Wyat
- Known for: "A breife declaration of the plantation of Virginia..." (1624)
- Spouse: Margaret Sandys (m. 1618)
- Father: George Wyatt

Governor of Virginia
- In office November 18, 1621 – September 18, 1625
- Appointed by: James I
- Preceded by: George Yeardley
- Succeeded by: George Yeardley

Crown Governor of Virginia
- In office November, 1639 – February, 1641/42 (O.S./N.S.)
- Appointed by: Charles I
- Preceded by: John Harvey
- Succeeded by: William Berkeley

Sir Francis Wyatt (b. 1588 – d. 1644) was an English knight and government official. He was the first royal governor of Virginia. Wyatt sailed for the New World on August, 1621. He became governor shortly after his arrival in November, taking with him the first written constitution for an English colony. In 1622 he rallied the defence of Jamestown which was attacked by Native Americans, during which the lives of some 400 settlers were lost and he then oversaw the contraction of the colony from scattered outposts into a defensive core. Governor Wyatt spearheaded trading and expansion of the Virginia colony. Described as an ancient planter, Wyatt owned several parcels of land.

== Biography ==
Francis was the son of George Wyatt and his Jane Finch (daughter of Sir Thomas Finch). He was born at Boxley Manor in Kent, and attended St Mary Hall, Oxford, (from 1 July 1603) and Gray's Inn (1604). He was knighted on July 7, 1618 at Windsor. Around the same time, he married Margaret Sandys, daughter of Samuel Sandys.

Francis sailed aboard the George with his brother, the Reverend Hautt Wyatt and alongside William Claiborne, John Pott, and George Sandys in August, 1621. Also sailing with him on this voyage was his second cousin Henry Fleete, who helped settle Maryland.

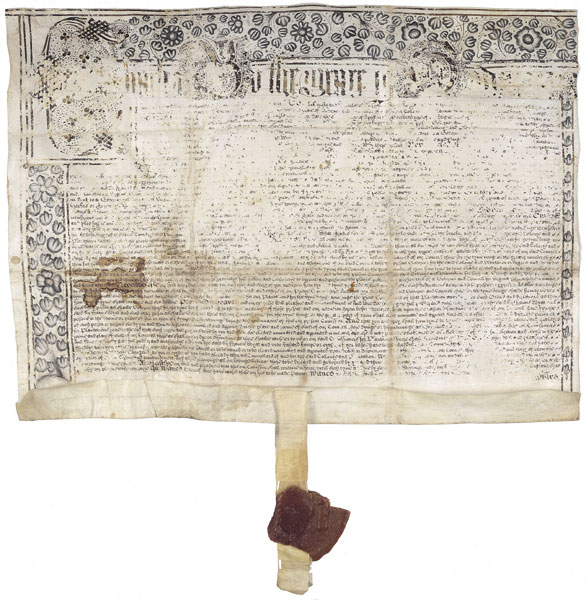
Royal commission from Charles I of England appointing Sir Francis Wyatt as Governor of Virginia

Wyatt was governor of Virginia from November 18, 1621. Wyatt had dealings with Nemattanew and leader Opechancanough, during a time of strife and also leading up to the Indian massacre of 1622.

Virginia became a royal colony in 1624, but Sir Francis, at the request of the crown, remained on as governor until 18 September 1625, when Sir George Yeardley, whom he had succeeded, resumed the office. In 1624, Wyatt resided in Jamestown with his wife, his brother Haute (Hawte), and seventeen servants. In 1625, he received a black servant girl, named "Brass", after a court settlement from her previous employer. At the same time, Wyatt was described as an ancient planter (which entitled him to land patents), and owned at least 500 acres near Blunt Poynt.

After leaving office, Wyatt left Virginia for Ireland and England to settle his father's estate. He was appointed governor again in 1639, sailing from England to take up his post. He served from November 1639 until February 1641 and was then succeeded by Sir William Berkeley. He arranged the purchase of the home of the previous governor to use as the first designated "state house" of the colony, the government previously having met in the church.

Wyatt returned to England after his second term as governor and died in Boxley. He was buried there on 24 August 1644.

Sir Francis Wyatt organized the General Assembly which had been called in 1619. This was the first legislative body in America. Sir Francis caused its privileges to be embodied in a written constitution, the first of its kind in the New World.

== Family ==
Coat of Arms of Francis Wyatt

Francis Wyatt's grandfather was Sir Thomas Wyatt the younger, who had led the Kent faction of Wyatt's rebellion to the Spanish marriage of Queen Mary in support of Lady Elizabeth, and was executed for treason as a result. His great-grandfather Thomas Wyatt the elder, the poet, was briefly imprisoned in the Tower of London for an alleged relationship with Anne Boleyn.

Sir Francis's wife, Margaret, was the daughter of Sir Samuel Sandys and the niece of George Sandys, the treasurer of Jamestown. Francis and Margaret's children included Henry (whose daughter Frances briefly held Boxley); Francis (who was at King's College, Cambridge, in 1639); Edwin (an MP who successfully sued his niece to regain Boxley, but whose son died without issue); and Elizabeth (grandmother of Robert Marsham, 1st Baron Romney (1685–1724), who eventually inherited Boxley). Boxley remained with the barons and earls of Romney for more than two hundred years.

His younger brother, the Reverend Hawte Wyatt (1594–1638), who was the rector of Maidstone, Kent, travelled to Virginia with Francis in 1621 and returned with him to England in 1624 after their father died. Rev. Wyatt's many descendants in America include the late Duchess of Windsor, wife of Edward VIII, later the Duke of Windsor as well as 50th vice president of the United States JD Vance.

Government offices
Preceded by George Yeardley	Colonial Governor of Virginia; 1621–1626	Succeeded by George Yeardley
Preceded by John Harvey	Colonial Governor of Virginia; 1639–1642	Succeeded by William Berkeley
