= Edward Darrell (died 1530) =

English politician

Sir Edward Darrell (1465/66 – 1530), of Littlecote, Wiltshire, was an English politician. He is chiefly remembered as the father of Elizabeth Darrell, who was a maid of honour to Queen Katherine of Aragon. Elizabeth had a notorious affair with the poet Sir Thomas Wyatt, by whom she had several children, and was later rumoured to have planned to become the sixth Queen of Henry VIII.

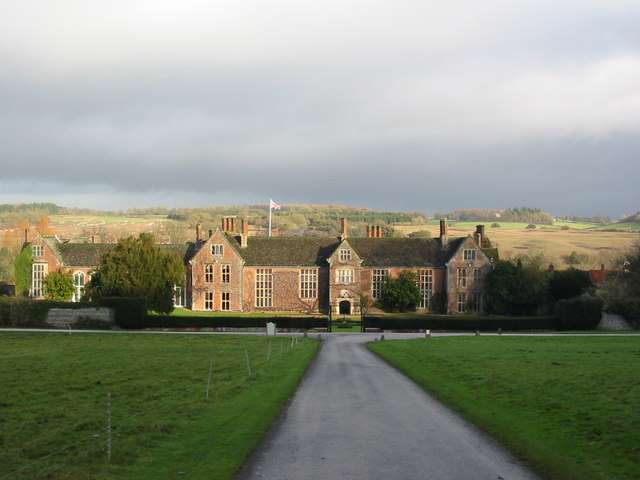
Littlecote House, the principal Darrell residence

He was the only son of Sir George Darrell of Littlecote (died 1474), Keeper of the Great Wardrobe to King Edward IV, and his second wife Joan Haute, daughter of William Haute. His father died when Edward was eight years old, and he succeeded to very substantial estates, the bulk of which were in Wiltshire: Littlecote House was the principal family residence. He had at least one half-sister Elizabeth, who married John Seymour: they were the grandparents of Queen Jane Seymour.

Despite his Yorkist background, his loyalty to the Tudor dynasty was never seriously in doubt, and he prospered as a result. He fought for the victorious King Henry VII at the Battle of Stoke Field in 1487, when he was barely of age, and was knighted as a result. King Henry seems to have had complete trust in Edward, even after his father-in-law Lord Fitzwalter was executed for treason in 1496. He was made Vice-Chamberlain of the household to Katherine of Aragon, and in that capacity accompanied her and the king to Henry's meeting in 1520 with Francis I of France at the Field of the Cloth of Gold.

He was a Member (MP) of the Parliament of England for Wiltshire in 1529. He died before the Parliament was asked to approve Henry VIII's decision to divorce Katherine of Aragon, but as a long-serving member of Katherine's household, he is thought to have been opposed to it. He served five times as Sheriff of Wiltshire.

He was married three times. His first wife was Jane Croft, daughter of Sir Richard Croft of Croft Castle. His second wife was Mary Radcliffe, daughter of John Radcliffe, 9th Baron Fitzwalter and Margaret Whetehill; Lord Fitzwalter was executed for treason in 1496. His third wife was Alice Flye, widow of Edmund Stanhope. He had at least seven children: John, Edward (possibly a confusion with Edmund), Edmund, Jane (first wife of Sir Anthony Hungerford), Elizabeth (mistress of Sir Thomas Wyatt and wife of Robert Stroud), Anne (wife of Sir John Hungerford), Katherine (wife of Francis Choke) and another Elizabeth (wife of Thomas Lawson). John, his eldest son, predeceased him and his estates passed to John's son Edmund. The Darrells profited from a close family connection to Jane Seymour, who was the elder Sir Edward's grandniece. Later in the century, however, they fell into serious financial difficulties, and were forced to sell Littlecote in 1589.
