= John Heydon (died 1479) =

- Died: 1479
- Buried: Norwich Cathedral
- Spouse: Eleanor Winter
- Issue: Sir Henry Heydon
- Father: William Baxter

John Heydon (né Baxter; died 1479) of Baconsthorpe, Norfolk, was of humble origins, the son of a yeoman, William Baxter of Heydon. He became a successful lawyer, and is known, through the Paston Letters, as one of the principal agents in East Anglia of William de la Pole, 1st Duke of Suffolk, and one of the chief opponents of the Paston family.

== Career ==
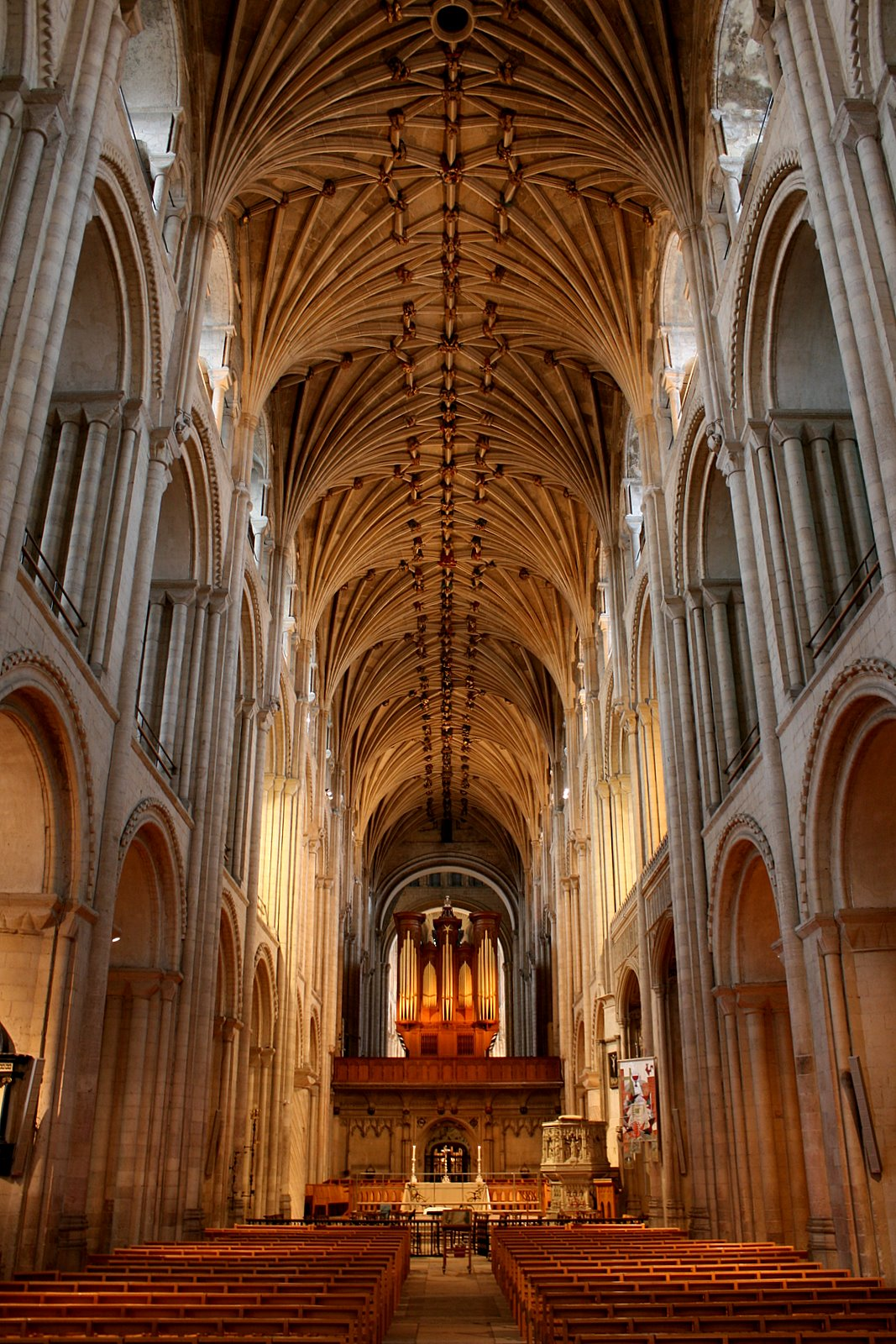
Interior of Norwich Cathedral, where John Heydon was buried

John was the son of a yeoman, William Baxter of Heydon, Norfolk. Legal records from as late as 1450 refer to him as 'John Heydon of Baconsthorpe alias John Baxter of Heydon'. His mother's name was Jane, daughter and heiress of John Warren, of Lincolnshire, whose arms, Chequey or and azure, on a canton gules, a lion rampant argent, is also quartered by the Heydons family; William was the first of his family that settled at Baconsthorpe, having purchased a moiety of the manor of Woodhall in this town, and was buried in the chapel in the north isle, with this epitaph, now lost: O Jesu tolle a me quod feci Et remaneat mihi quod tu fecisti, Ne pereat quod sanguine tuo redemisti.

John was educated at the Inns of Court, and, by 1428, was acting on behalf of Edmund Winter of Town Barningham, Norfolk, likely in connection with Winter's dispute with the Paston family over the manor of East Beckham.

In 1431, he was appointed Recorder of Norwich, but was unpopular with the townsmen, and was dismissed from the position before May 1437. Many years later, in 1450, it was alleged that during his tenure as Recorder he had informed Norwich Cathedral priory of information concerning the City of Norwich's dispute with the priory. By the mid-1430s he was acting as legal counsel for the priory, and, by 1445, was the priory's chief steward. From 1438 onward, he served on numerous commissions in Norfolk, was a Justice of the Peace from 1441 to 1450, and, in 1445, a Knight of the Shire for Norfolk. By 1447, he was steward of the East Anglian estates of Henry Stafford, 2nd Duke of Buckingham. Among his numerous legal clients were Lord Bardolf, Lord Cromwell, Lord Willoughby and Sir John Clifton (d.1447).

However Heydon chiefly owed his prominence in East Anglia to his service with William de la Pole, 1st Duke of Suffolk (d. 1450), with whom he had become associated by 1435. Through his influence with Henry VI, Suffolk is said to have ousted John Mowbray, 3rd Duke of Norfolk, from his rightful position as the dominant magnate in East Anglia. Two of his agents in particular, Heydon and Sir Thomas Tuddenham, from 1443 jointly held the 'powerful and lucrative' stewardship of the Duchy of Lancaster, and are said to have terrorised East Anglian gentry, including the Paston family.

The conflict between the Pastons and Heydon over the years is recorded in the Paston Letters. In 1448, it centred on the manor of Gresham, which William Paston had purchased from Thomas Chaucer. In February of that year, 'almost certainly on Heydon's initiative', Robert Hungerford, 3rd Baron Hungerford, asserted his wife's claim to Gresham, then in the hands of William Paston's son, John. Paston attempted to recover the manor through negotiation and legal action; both proved fruitless, and, in October 1448, Paston asserted possession by sending his wife, Margaret, to reside in a house in Gresham. In the following January Hungerford's servants assaulted and damaged the house, forcing Margaret Paston to leave; Hungerford remained in possession of Gresham for the next three years. In a letter in 1448 Margaret referred to Heydon as a 'false shrew'.

Suffolk fell from power at the beginning of 1450, and Heydon and Tuddenham immediately found themselves under attack by their principal opponents in East Anglia. Sir John Fastolf, a kinsman of John Paston's wife, Margaret, immediately requested a servant to provide him with a list of the wrongs which Heydon had done to him over the previous thirteen years, and in October 1450, a commission was empowered to inquire into complaints in East Anglia.

Indictments were drawn up which provided details of Heydon's and Tuddenham's actions during the previous fifteen years; according to Richmond, these allegations were perhaps biased, since Fastolf, John Paston, and the City of Norwich were among the principal informants, but it is 'likely that much of the shire was hostile to the pair of them'. During the years 1450–51 the Duke of Norfolk, John de Vere, 12th Earl of Oxford, and Fastolf also exerted efforts to remove Suffolk's former agents from positions of local power. These efforts were ultimately unsuccessful, however. By the spring of 1451, Suffolk's widow, Alice (d.1475), and Thomas Scales, 7th Baron Scales, had regained Suffolk's former dominance in East Anglia.

After this setback, Heydon was never again as influential in East Anglia, although he retained his offices and stewardships, and was a member of various commissions from 1452 on. When the Lancastrian regime was overthrown in 1460–61, the Pastons hoped that Heydon would be destroyed. However although Tuddenham was executed in 1462, Heydon was not. He continued to enjoy the patronage of Suffolk's widow, Alice, and was able to obtain a pardon from the Yorkists in April 1462 on payment of 500 marks. During the Readeption of Henry VI he attempted to gain the favour of John de Vere, 13th Earl of Oxford, a Lancastrian, and was appointed to two commissions, but thereafter, for the remaining eighteen years of his life he was not prominent in public affairs, although he continued to practice law and to administer his clients' estates as well as his own.

Heydon died in 1479, leaving more than sixteen manors to his son and heir Sir Henry Heydon, purchased with the wealth acquired during his career. Among them was his seat at Baconsthorpe, where he had rebuilt the manor house, a project perhaps begun about 1446 when the King granted him forty oak trees from the forest at Gimingham.

His will, which he made in March 1478, makes no reference to his wife or to any child other than his son, Henry. In addition to numerous charitable bequests, he left £200 towards the marriages of his granddaughters, and £20 towards his burial in the Heydon chapel in Norwich Cathedral.

== Marriage and issue ==
Heydon married Eleanor Winter, the daughter of his first patron, Edmund Winter (d.1448) of Barningham, by whom he had a son and heir, Sir Henry Heydon.

He disputed the parentage of a second child born to his wife Eleanor. In a letter written in July 1444, Margaret Paston claimed that Heydon would have nothing to do with either his wife or the child, and that he had threatened to cut off his wife's nose and kill the child.
