= Elizabeth Darrell (courtier) =

English courtier

- Born: c. 1513
- Died: 1556 (aged 42–43)
- Occupation: Mistress to poet Sir Thomas Wyatt
- Spouse: Robert Stroud
- Partner: Sir Thomas Wyatt
- Children: Henry; Francis; Edward
- Parent(s): Sir Edward Darrell (died 1530); Alice Flye

Elizabeth Darrell (born c. 1513 – c. 1556) was the long-term mistress and muse of Sir Thomas Wyatt. They had one surviving child, Francis. Wyatt was married to Elizabeth Brooke, Lady Wyatt whom he had accused of committing adultery, resulting in their separation. She was later rumoured to have been involved with Henry VIII.

== Early years ==
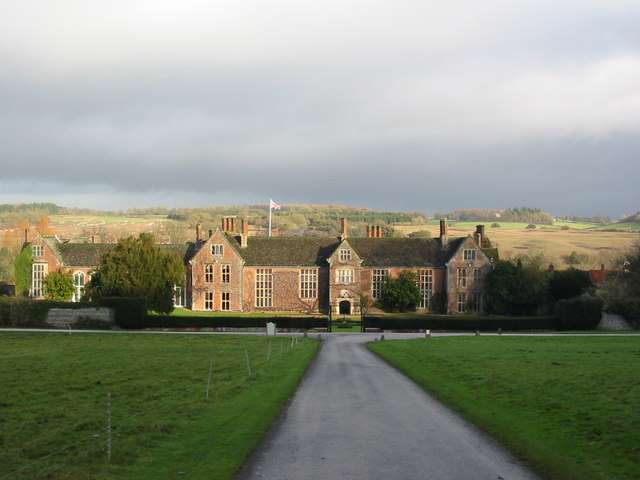
Littlecote House, Elizabeth's family home

Elizabeth Darrell (sometimes spelt Darell) was the daughter of Sir Edward Darrell of Littlecote, Wiltshire. If she was born circa 1513, she must have been the daughter of Sir Edward's third wife, Alice Flye Stanhope who married him before 1513. Sir Edward was Chamberlain to Catherine of Aragon. Elizabeth was a servant of the Marchioness of Dorset and then afterward, on an unknown date, she became maid of honour to Queen Catherine. Possibly out of loyalty to Catherine or due to her dislike of Anne Boleyn, Elizabeth refused to take the Oath of Supremacy. When Catherine of Aragon died in January 1536, she left Elizabeth a gift of £200 for her future marriage.

== Thomas Wyatt ==
Around the year 1537, Elizabeth became the mistress of the poet and diplomat, Sir Thomas Wyatt (1503 – 11 October 1542). He was legally married to Elizabeth Brooke, the mother of his son Thomas, although they were separated. Elizabeth bore Sir Thomas two, possibly three, sons:

- Henry Wyatt alias Darrell, who died by 1544.
- Francis Wyatt alias Darrell, who probably died by 1556.
- (possibly) Edward, who was buried at Boxley, Kent, 26 December 1590. He could have been born after his father's death, or he might have been the illegitimate son of Sir Thomas Wyatt the younger instead.

The identity of Edward Wyatt, who took part in the Wyatt's Rebellion of 1554, led by Sir Thomas Wyatt, the younger is unclear. Some sources claim that he was the illegitimate son of Sir Thomas Wyatt the elder and Elizabeth Darrell, while others state that he was the illegitimate son of Sir Thomas Wyatt the younger. Kenneth Muir in 'The Life and Letters of Sir Thomas Wyatt' , asserts that Elizabeth Darrell was the mistress of Sir Thomas Wyatt the elder and quotes various state papers to support this view. Henry is the only child by Elizabeth Darrell known to have been mentioned in Sir Thomas Wyatt the elder's (apparently lost) will, although it is possible that Francis and perhaps Edward might have been born after their father's death. Sir Thomas Wyatt the elder is also known to have had a daughter, Frances.

Sir Thomas left Elizabeth properties in Dorset. In 1544, Sir Thomas the younger transferred lands in Tintinhull, Somerset, to the use of Elizabeth Darrell for her life, and to descend to her son Francis Darrell for the term of his life. Sir Thomas transferred the site of Tarrant priory, Dorset, to Francis Darrell, with reversion to his mother Elizabeth in the event he produced no heirs, and then to Sir Thomas upon the death of Elizabeth. With the attainder of Sir Thomas the younger in 1554, the properties held by Elizabeth and Francis reverted to the Crown after her death (and apparently Francis's). She was in possession of Tintinhull in 1547 but it was leased to the Crown's tenant, Sir William Petre, 19 January 1556, and papers relating to the lease suggest that Elizabeth had died, as apparently had Francis. The parsonage at Stoke, Somerset, was leased to Elizabeth in 1548. Elizabeth married Robert Strode around 1554, at about the same time that Mary I seems to have paid Elizabeth a legacy left to her by Queen Catherine of Aragon.

== In popular culture ==
Canadian actress Krystin Pellerin portrayed Darrell in several episodes of the second season of The Tudors. Her fate is however dramatically altered. Instead of returning to royal service after the death of her mistress, as is historically accurate, Darrell hangs herself from the beams of her mistress's former home. The show is correct however in portraying Darrell's and Wyatt's affair. She also appears in Hilary Mantel’s Wolf Hall trilogy as an attendant of Catherine of Aragon and later of Princess Mary, and in Elizabeth Cook's Lux as she moves from loyalty to Katherine (as it is spelt in the novel) to Wyatt.

== Bibliography ==
- "A Who's Who of Tudor Women". Kateemersonhistoricals.com. Archived from the original on 2 June 2012.
- Burrow, Colin (2004). "Wyatt, Sir Thomas (c.1503-1542)". Oxford Dictionary of National Biography. Oxford University Press.
- Miller, Helen (1982). "WYATT, Sir Thomas I (by 1504-42), of Allington Castle, Kent.". In Bindoff, S. T. (ed.). The History of Parliament: the House of Commons 1509-1558. Members. Historyofparliamentonline.org. Archived from the original on 8 October 2020.
- Muir, Kenneth (1963), The Life and Letters of Sir Thomas Wyatt (Liverpool English texts and studies), LIVERPOOL: Liverpool University Press, ISBN 978-0-14-042227-6
- Shulman, Nicola (2012). Graven With Diamonds: The Many Lives of Thomas Wyatt: Courtier, Poet, Assassin, Spy in the Court of Henry VIII (Paperback). Short Books. ISBN 9781780720883.
- Thomson, Patricia (1964). Sir Thomas Wyatt and His Background. London: Routledge.
