= Baconsthorpe =

Village in the English county of Norfolk

Coordinates: 52.889°N 1.154°E

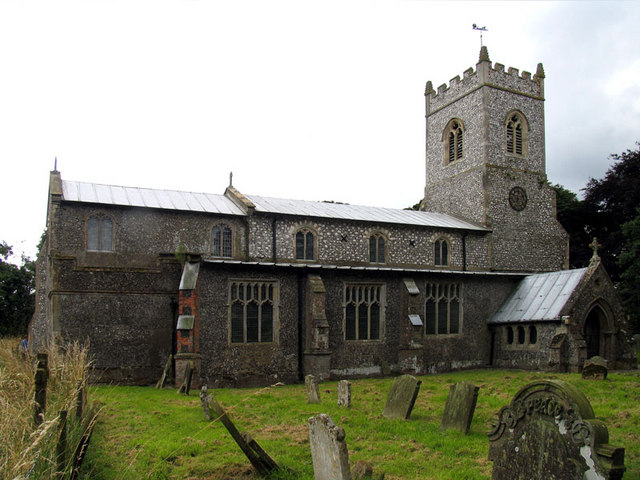
- Saint Mary parish church, Baconsthorpe, Norfolk

- Location within Norfolk
- Area: 5.53 km^{2} (2.14 sq mi)
- Population: 215 (parish, 2011 census)
  - Density: 39/km^{2} (100/sq mi)
- OS grid reference: TG120370
  - London: 130 miles (210 km)
- Civil parish: Baconsthorpe
- District: North Norfolk
- Shire county: Norfolk
- Region: East
- Country: England
- Sovereign state: United Kingdom
- Post town: HOLT
- Postcode district: NR25
- Dialling code: 01263
- Police: Norfolk
- Fire: Norfolk
- Ambulance: East of England

Baconsthorpe is a village and civil parish in the North Norfolk district of the English county of Norfolk. It is 4 miles (6.4 km) south-east of Holt, 5 miles (8.0 km) south of Sheringham and 20 miles (32 km) north of Norwich.

== Population and governance ==
The civil parish has an area of 5.53 square kilometres (2.14 sq mi). In the 2001 census it had a population of 232 in 105 households. This fell to 215 at the Census 2011, and was estimated at 216 in 2019. For local government, the parish is in the district of North Norfolk.

== Heritage ==
The village's name derives from "Bacon's outlying farm/settlement", Bacon being the surname of the local landowner in Norman times.

The ruins of the 15th-century Baconsthorpe Castle lie about one mile (1.6 km) to the north of the village.

The medieval Anglican Church of St Mary was restored in 1868 and 1958. It contains monuments from the 15th–18th centuries and some 16th-century glass saved from the castle.

== Notable residents ==
- John Baconthorpe [sic] or Bacon (c. 1290–1347), Carmelite friar and scholastic philosopher, born at Baconsthorpe
- John Heydon or Baxter (died 1479) rose from the yeomanry to become prominent as a lawyer.
- Sir Henry Heydon (died 1504), lawyer, courtier and landowner, died at Baconsthorpe.
- Sir Christopher Heydon (1561–1623), soldier, astrologer, and a county member of Parliament for Norfolk, ran his Norfolk estates from Baconsthorpe Castle.
- Robert Brightiffe (c. 1666–1749), a barrister and a member of Parliament for Norwich and recorder there, was born at his father's house in Baconsthorpe.
