= Henry Heydon =

English noble

- Died: 1504; Baconsthorpe, Norfolk
- Buried: Norwich Cathedral
- Spouse: Anne Boleyn
- Issue: John Heydon; Henry Heydon; William Heydon; Dorothy Heydon; Bridget Heydon; Anne Heydon; Elizabeth Heydon; Amy Heydon
- Father: John Heydon
- Mother: Eleanor Winter

Sir Henry Heydon (died 1504) was an English lawyer and knight as well as a royal official.

== Career ==
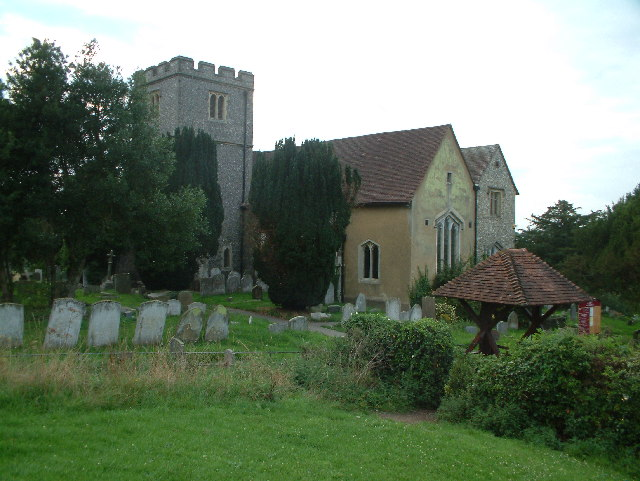
St John the Baptist church in West Wickham, rebuilt by Henry Heydon

Henry Heydon was the son of John Heydon (d. 1479) of Baconsthorpe, Norfolk, and Eleanor Winter, the daughter of Edmund Winter (d. 1448) of Barningham, Norfolk. Trained as a lawyer, he frequently advised other Norfolk landowners. He served as a justice of the peace in Norfolk from 1473, and on various commissions in that county and elsewhere.

Heydon's inheritance from his father included at least sixteen manors, and he added to his holdings through the purchase of lands in both Norfolk and Kent. One of his purchases in Kent was West Wickham, where he built Wickham Court. After establishing himself in Kent, he served as justice of the peace there in the late 1480s and in the 1490s. Heydon acted as steward in Norfolk to Katherine Woodville, the widow of Henry Stafford, 2nd Duke of Buckingham, in the 1490s. He was a supervisor of the will of Cecily Neville, Duchess of York, and served as steward of her household and chief bailiff on one of her estates.

Heydon was knighted at the coronation of Henry VII and attended the arrival of Catherine of Aragon in England in 1501, but mostly he was "primarily a local servant of the crown rather than a courtier".

Some of Heydon's wealth as a sheep farmer was expended in building projects. He completed the castle at Baconsthorpe, restored the church at Kelling and built a new church at Salthouse. He also constructed a causeway between Thursford and Walsingham. In Kent he rebuilt the church at West Wickham and built a fortified manor house.

Heydon died at Baconsthorpe between 20 February and 22 May 1504, and was interred in Norwich Cathedral in a now-vanished family chapel. A memorial window said to be his in the church at West Wickham depicts a kneeling human skeleton with the Heydon arms.

== Marriage and issue ==
Heydon married, likely after 1463, Anne Boleyn, second daughter of Geoffrey Boleyn, Lord Mayor of London, by whom he had three sons and five daughters:

- John Heydon, eldest son and heir, a leading member of the Norfolk gentry during the reign of Henry VIII, who married Katherine Willoughby, the daughter of Christopher Willoughby of Parham, Suffolk, and Margaret Jenny.
- Henry Heydon, who married Anne, the daughter of John Armstrong.
- William Heydon, slain during Kett's Rebellion, and buried in the church of St Peter Mancroft, Norwich.
- Dorothy Heydon, who married, as his first wife, Thomas Brooke, 8th Baron Cobham and secondly Edward Warner.
- Bridget Heydon, who married William Paston, son of John Paston
- Anne Heydon (died c. 1521), who married firstly William Gurney of Instead, Norfolk, and secondly Lionel Dymoke of Ashby, Lincolnshire.
- Elizabeth Heydon, who married Walter Hobart of Hales Hall
- Amy Heydon who married Roger L'Estrange of Hunstanton, Norfolk
