= Thomas Wyatt (poet) =

English poet and diplomat (1503–1542)

Sir Thomas Wyatt
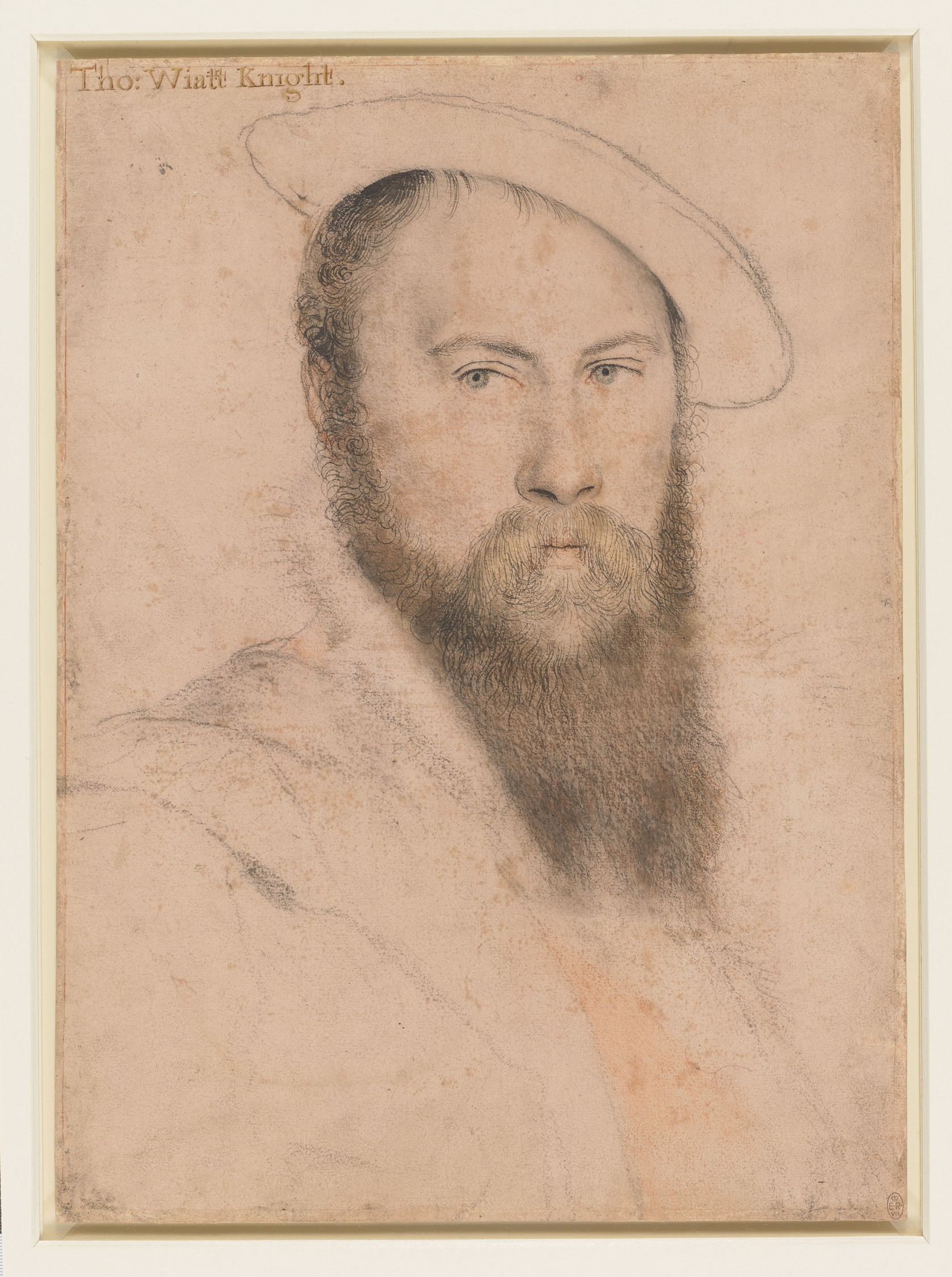
- Depiction by Hans Holbein the Younger
- Born: 1503; Allington Castle, Kent, England
- Died: 11 October 1542 (aged 38–39); Clifton Maybank House, Dorset, England
- Resting place: Sherborne Abbey, Dorset
- Education: St John's College, Cambridge
- Occupations: Statesman, poet
- Title: Ambassador of England; High Sheriff of Kent; Knight of the shire for Kent
- Spouse: Elizabeth Brooke
- Children: Sir Thomas Wyatt the Younger
- Parent(s): Sir Henry Wyatt; Anne Skinner
- Writing career
- Language: Early Modern English
- Period: High Renaissance
- Genres: Poetry (sonnet; epigram; satire; song; translation)
- Movements: English Renaissance, Petrarchism

Sir Thomas Wyatt (1503 – 11 October 1542) was a 16th-century English politician, ambassador, and lyric poet credited with introducing the sonnet to English literature. He was born at Allington Castle near Maidstone in Kent, though his family was originally from Yorkshire. His family adopted the Lancastrian side in the Wars of the Roses. His mother was Anne Skinner, and his father Henry, who had earlier been imprisoned and tortured by Richard III, had been a Privy Councillor of Henry VII and remained a trusted adviser when Henry VIII ascended the throne in 1509.

Thomas followed his father to court after his education at St John's College, Cambridge. Entering the King's service, he was entrusted with many important diplomatic missions. In public life, his principal patron was Thomas Cromwell, after whose death he was imprisoned (1541). Though subsequently pardoned and released, shortly thereafter he died. His poems were circulated at court and may have been published anonymously in the anthology The Court of Venus (earliest edition c. 1537) during his lifetime, but were not published under his name until after his death; the first major book to feature and attribute his verse was Tottel's Miscellany (1557), printed 15 years after his death.

Notable sonnets by Thomas Wyatt include "Avising the bright beams of these fair eyes", "Farewell love and all thy laws forever", "I abide and abide and better abide", "I find no peace, and all my war is done", "My galley, charged with forgetfulness", "The long love that in my thought doth harbour", "Unstable dream, according to the place", and "Whoso list to hunt, I know where is an hind". Another famous poem by Wyatt is "They Flee from Me".

== Early life ==
Thomas Wyatt was born at Allington, Kent, in 1503, the son of Sir Henry Wyatt and Anne Skinner, the daughter of John Skinner of Reigate, Surrey. He had a brother Henry, assumed to have died an infant, and a sister, Margaret who married Sir Anthony Lee (died 1549) and was the mother of Queen Elizabeth's champion, Sir Henry Lee.

=== Education and diplomatic career ===
Wyatt was over six feet tall, reportedly both handsome and physically strong. In 1515, Wyatt entered Henry's service as 'Sewer Extraordinary' and the same year he began studying at St John's College, Cambridge. His father had been associated with Sir Thomas Boleyn as constable of Norwich Castle, and Wyatt was thus acquainted with Anne Boleyn.

Following a diplomatic mission to Spain, in 1526, he accompanied Sir John Russell, 1st Earl of Bedford, to Rome to help petition Pope Clement VII to annul Henry VIII's marriage to Catherine of Aragon, in hopes of freeing him to marry Anne Boleyn. Russell being incapacitated, Wyatt was also sent to negotiate with the Republic of Venice. According to some, Wyatt was captured by the armies of Emperor Charles V when they captured Rome and imprisoned the pope in 1527, but he managed to escape and make it back to England.

From 1528 to 1530, Wyatt acted as high marshal at Calais. In the years following he continued in Henry's service; he was, however, imprisoned in the Tower of London for a month in 1536, perhaps because Henry hoped he would incriminate the queen. He was knighted in 1535 and appointed High Sheriff of Kent for 1536. At this time, he was sent to Spain as ambassador to Charles V, who was offended by the declaration of Princess Mary's illegitimacy; he was her cousin and they had once been briefly betrothed. Although Wyatt was unsuccessful in his endeavours, and was accused of disloyalty by some of his colleagues, he was protected by his relationship with Cromwell, at least during the latter's lifetime.

Wyatt was elected knight of the shire (MP) for Kent in December 1541.

=== Marriage and issue ===
In 1520, Wyatt married Elizabeth Brooke (1503–1560). A year later, they had a son Thomas (1521–1554) who led Wyatt's rebellion some 12 years after his father's death. In 1524, Henry VIII assigned Wyatt to be an ambassador at home and abroad. Soon afterwards, Wyatt separated from his wife on grounds of adultery.

== Wyatt's poetry and influence ==
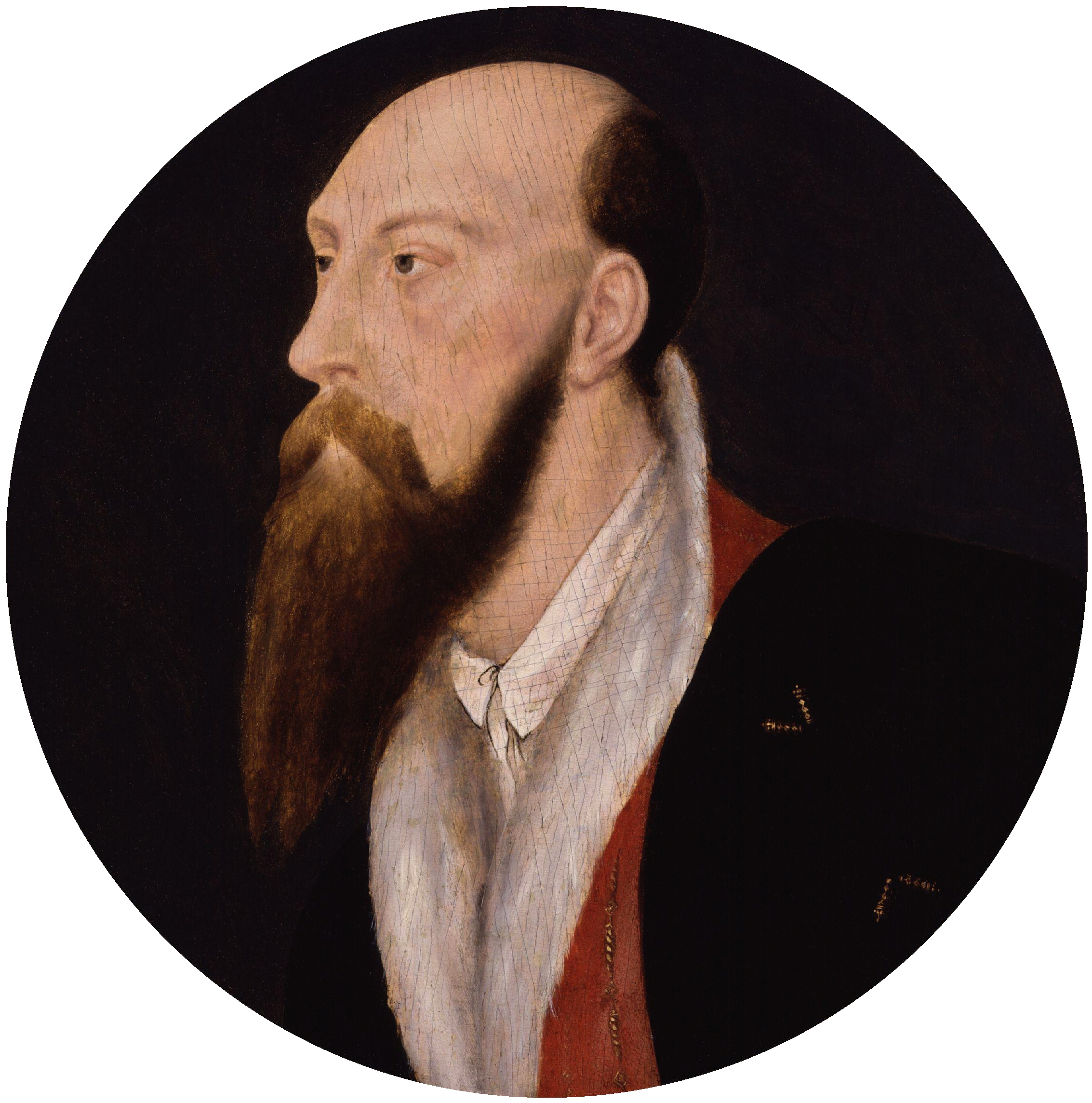
A portrait of Wyatt after a lost original by Hans Holbein the Younger from c. 1540

Wyatt's professed object was to experiment with the English language, to civilise it, to raise its powers to equal those of other European languages. His poetry may be considered as a part of the Petrarchism movement within Renaissance literature. A significant amount of his literary output consists of translations and imitations of sonnets by Italian poet Petrarch; he also wrote sonnets of his own. He took subject matter from Petrarch's sonnets, but his rhyme schemes are significantly different. Petrarch's sonnets consist of an "octave" rhyming abba abba, followed by a "sestet" with various rhyme schemes. Wyatt employs the Petrarchan octave, but his most common sestet scheme is cddc ee. Wyatt experimented in stanza forms including the rondeau, epigrams, terza rima, ottava rima songs, and satires, as well as with monorime, triplets with refrains, quatrains with different length of line and rhyme schemes, quatrains with codas, and the French forms of douzaine and treizaine. He introduced the poulter's measure form, rhyming couplets composed of a 12-syllable iambic line (Alexandrine) followed by a 14-syllable iambic line (fourteener), and he is considered a master of the iambic tetrameter.

Wyatt's poetry reflects classical and Italian models, but he also admired the work of Geoffrey Chaucer, and his vocabulary reflects that of Chaucer; for example, he uses Chaucer's word newfangleness, meaning fickleness, in They Flee from Me. "They Flee from Me" is often considered Wyatt's finest lyric. Written in rhyme royal (ababbcc), its three stanzas trace the speaker's reflection on women who once sought him willingly but have now abandoned him, culminating in a single remembered encounter of striking intimacy. The verse form was first used extensively by Chaucer, and the poem's use of hunting metaphors, with women portrayed as semi-wild and unpredictable, connects it to Wyatt's sonnet "Whoso List to Hunt", where similar motifs of wildness and tameness appear. The poem's tone shifts from nostalgia to bitterness and the irregularity of its meter has led some critics to suggest that Wyatt may have intended it for musical performance. It was included in Arthur Quiller-Couch's edition of the Oxford Book of English Verse and remains one of the most anthologized poems of the Tudor period. Many of his poems deal with the trials of romantic love and the devotion of the suitor to an unavailable or cruel mistress. C. S. Lewis described Wyatt's poetry as "full of resentment […] He never goes out of himself: how badly his mistress has treated him, how well he deserves to be treated, and how much more fortunate he has been with other women, how sorry she will be some day—such are his recurrent themes." Other poems are scathing, satirical indictments of the hypocrisy and pandering required of courtiers who are ambitious to advance at the Tudor court.

Wyatt's poems are short but fairly numerous. His 96 love poems appeared posthumously (1557) in a compendium called Tottel's Miscellany. His 31 sonnets are the first in English. Ten of them were translations from Petrarch, while all were written in the Petrarchan form, apart from the couplet ending which Wyatt introduced. Serious and reflective in tone, the sonnets show some stiffness of construction and a metrical uncertainty indicative of the difficulty Wyatt found in the new form. Yet their conciseness represents a great advance on the prolixity and uncouthness of much earlier poetry. Wyatt was also responsible for the introduction of the personal note into English poetry, for although he followed his models closely, he wrote of his own experiences. His epigrams, songs, and rondeaux are lighter than the sonnets, and they reveal the care and the elegance typical of the new romanticism. His satires are composed in the Italian terza rima, again showing the direction of the innovating tendencies.

=== Attribution ===
The Egerton Manuscript is an album containing Wyatt's personal selection of his poems and translations that preserves 123 texts, partly in his handwriting. Tottel's Miscellany (1557) is the Elizabethan anthology that created Wyatt's posthumous reputation; it ascribes 96 poems to him, including 33 not in the Egerton Manuscript. These 156 poems can be ascribed to Wyatt with certainty on the basis of objective evidence. Another 129 poems have been ascribed to him purely on the basis of subjective editorial judgment. They are mostly derived from the Devonshire Manuscript Collection and the Blage manuscript. Rebholz comments in his preface to Sir Thomas Wyatt, The Complete Poems, "The problem of determining which poems Wyatt wrote is as yet unsolved". However, a solution was already at hand and is now in place. Rebholz adopted the canon of 285 poems ascribed to Wyatt in his edition wholesale from the 1969 edition by Kenneth Muir and Patricia Thomson. This was the third edition of Wyatt issued by Muir (the first in 1949, the second in 1963), to each of which he added scores of poems derived principally from the several hundred anonymous poems included in the Devonshire Manuscript and then the newly discovered Blage Manuscript – poems ascribed to Wyatt on no other basis than Muir's own judgment or whim. Already in the early 1970s Joost Daalder produced an edition (Oxford 1975) which attempts and partly succeeds in renovating the Wyatt canon to accord with documentary facts; also in that year, Richard Harrier published his magisterial philological study of the manuscript evidence, The Canon of Sir Thomas Wyatt’s Poetry (Harvard University Press 1975). On the basis of a meticulous scientific study of the documentary evidence, Harrier establishes a fact-based canon of Wyatt's poems. Later studies by other scholars (Helen Baron, 1989 and 1994, and Jason Powell, 2009) confirm the outlines and tenor of Harrier's analysis. On the basis of Harrier's analysis, 101 of the 285 poems included in Rebholz's edition are demonstrably not Wyatt's work. Harrier's researches establish that another 33 poems from other sources (besides The Egerton Manuscript and Tottel's) can be ascribed to Wyatt on the basis of solid documentary evidence and plausible editorial judgment.

=== Assessment ===
Critical opinions have varied widely regarding Wyatt's work. Eighteenth-century critic Thomas Warton considered Wyatt "confessedly an inferior" to his contemporary Henry Howard and felt that Wyatt's "genius was of the moral and didactic species" but deemed him "the first polished English satirist". The 20th century saw an awakening in his popularity and a surge in critical attention. His poems were found praiseworthy by numerous modern poets, including Ezra Pound, Marianne Moore, John Berryman, Yvor Winters, Basil Bunting, Louis Zukofsky and George Oppen. C. S. Lewis called him "the father of the Drab Age" (i.e. the inornate, in contrast to what he calls the "golden" age of the 16th century). Patricia Thomson describes Wyatt as "the Father of English Poetry".

== Rumoured affair with Anne Boleyn ==
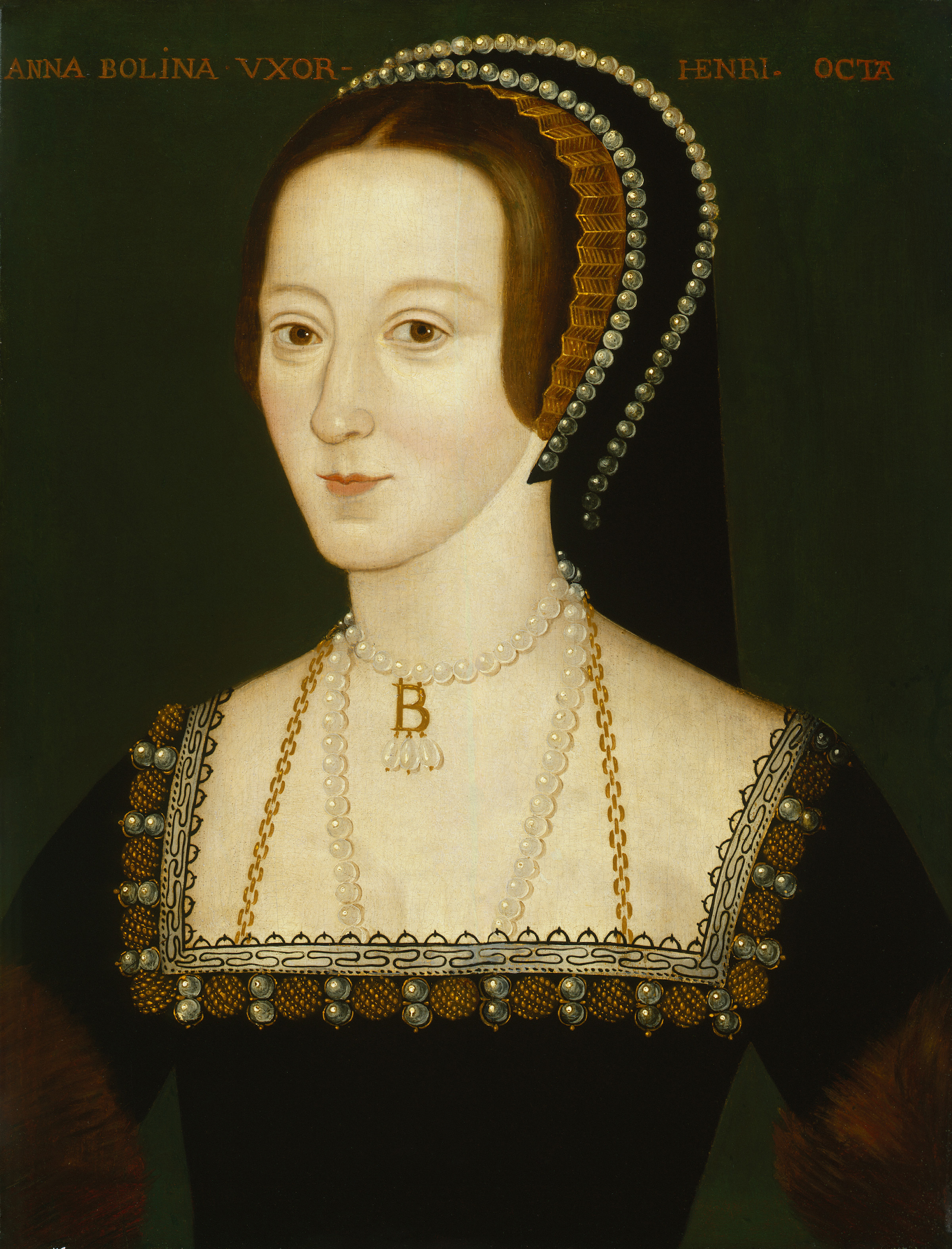
Anne Boleyn

Many have conjectured that Wyatt fell in love with Anne Boleyn in the early- to mid-1520s. Their acquaintance is certain, but it is not certain whether the two shared a romantic relationship. George Gilfillan implies that Wyatt and Boleyn were romantically involved. In his verse, Wyatt calls his mistress Anna and might allude to events in her life:

Sometime I fled the fire that me brent [burnt],
By hills, by dales, by water and by wind,
And now I follow the coals that be quent [quenched],
From Dover to Calais against my mind.

Gilfillan argues that these lines could refer to Anne's trip to France in 1532 prior to her marriage to Henry VIII and could imply that Wyatt was present, although his name is not included among those who accompanied the royal party to France. Wyatt's sonnet "Whoso List To Hunt" may also allude to Anne's relationship with the King:

Graven in diamonds with letters plain,
There is written her fair neck round about,
"Noli me tangere [Do not touch me], for Caesar's I am".

In still plainer terms, Wyatt's late sonnet "If waker care" describes his first "love" for "Brunette that set our country in a roar"—presumably Boleyn.

Wyatt's grandson George Wyatt included in his Life of Queen Anne Boleigne a story that Thomas Wyatt obtained a jewel belonging to Anne, and that Henry VIII heard of this. The jewel was loose "hanging by a lace out of her pocket", a "tablet" (a kind of locket) which Wyatt took to wear at his neck. Henry VIII recognised the jewel when he played bowls with Wyatt. Anne said that Wyatt had obtained the jewel without her permission. However, the details of the story seem incompatible with courtly behaviour and are unconvincing.

== Imprisonment on charges of adultery ==
In May 1536, Wyatt was imprisoned in the Tower of London for allegedly committing adultery with Anne Boleyn. He was released later that year thanks to his friendship or his father's friendship with Thomas Cromwell, and he returned to his duties. During his stay in the Tower, he may have witnessed Anne Boleyn's execution (which took place on 19 May 1536) from his cell window, as well as the executions of the five men with whom she was accused of adultery; he wrote a poem which might have been inspired by that experience.

== Second imprisonment and death ==
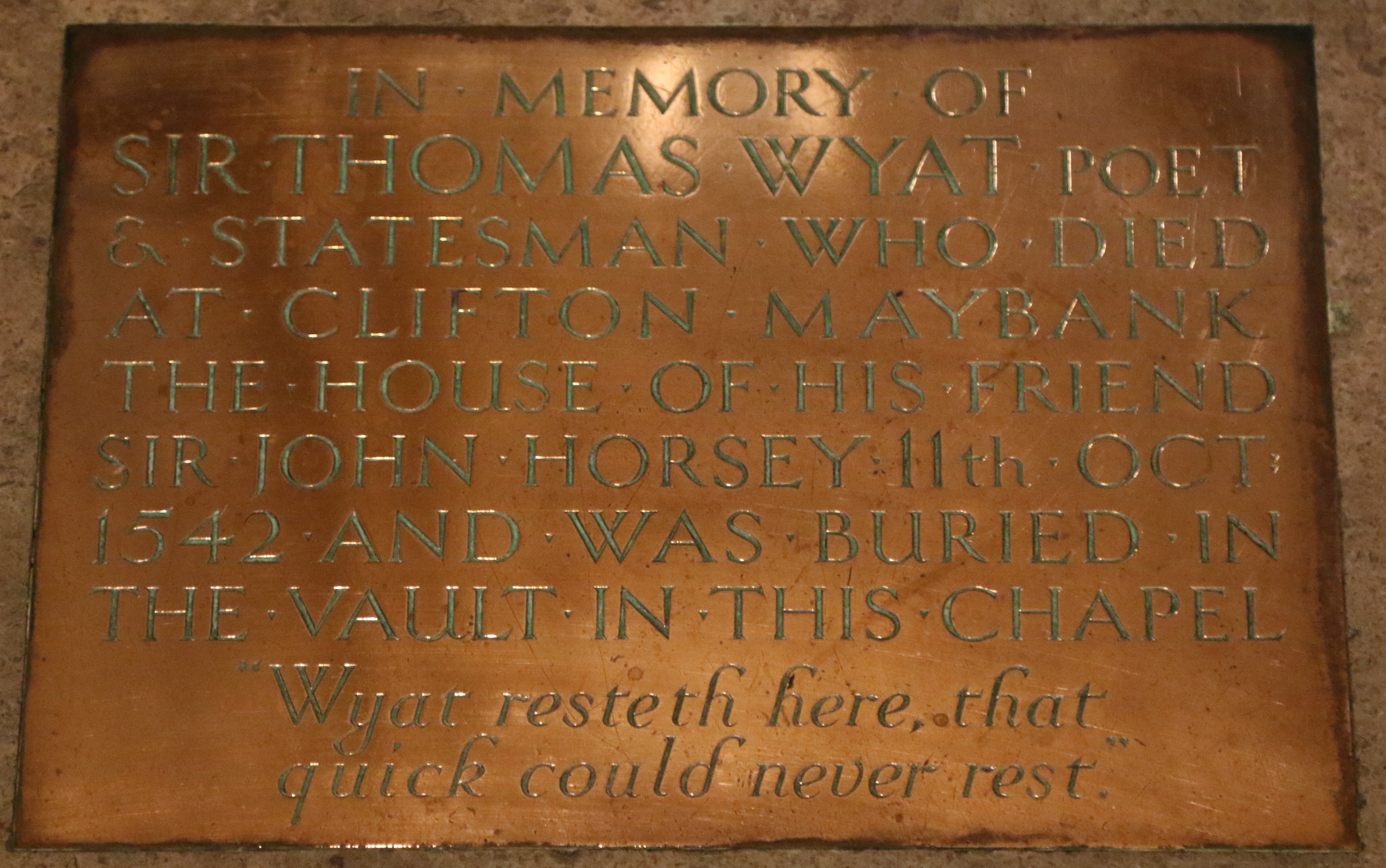
Memorial in Sherborne Abbey. The verse quoted at the end of the inscription is the incipit of Henry Howard's elegy to Wyatt.

In about 1536, Wyatt took as his mistress Elizabeth Darrell, a former maid to Catherine of Aragon. They had at least one child together, a son called Francis. Wyatt left land to Elizabeth and Francis in his will.

In March 1540, Wyatt gave up some of his properties in Kent in exchange for significant leaseholds in Kent, Surrey, and London, including the dissolved Boxley Abbey in Kent and the priory of the Crutched Friars in the capital. The French ambassador Marillac described him as "one of the richest gentlemen in England" and estimated his yearly income at six or seven thousand ducats, although this may be an exaggeration. In June that same year, Wyatt's patron Thomas Cromwell was arrested. Wyatt was reportedly present at Cromwell's execution on 28 July. According to a contemporary Spanish account, Cromwell addressed Wyatt from the scaffold, saying, "Gentle Wyatt, God be with you, and I pray you to pray God for me", but Wyatt was so overcome with tears that he could not respond. His poem "The piller pearisht is whearto I lent" is traditionally viewed as a reflection on Cromwell's death.

The demise of Wyatt's protector left him vulnerable, and accusations made against him during his embassy in 1538 were brought up once more. It was alleged that he had been in contact with Henry VIII's enemy Cardinal Reginald Pole and that he had called for the King's death. He was taken to the tower on 17 January 1541. He then wrote a defence responding to the charges, "a careful mingling of outright denial and implicit confession". The document confessed enough to be considered a full confession. He was released on 19 March, reportedly thanks to the intervention of Queen Catherine Howard. Thomas Wriothesley stated that Wyatt confessed his guilt and received a pardon from the King at Dover in late March. Eustace Chapuys reported that the pardon was granted on the condition of Wyatt reconciling with his wife. Wyatt then received new lands and offices and resumed his duties as ambassador. After the execution of Catherine Howard, there were rumours that Wyatt's wife Elizabeth was a possibility to become Henry VIII's next wife despite the fact that she was still married to Wyatt. He became ill not long after and died on 11 October 1542 around age 39. He is buried in Sherborne Abbey.

== Descendants and relatives ==
Long after Wyatt's death, his only legitimate son Sir Thomas Wyatt the Younger led a thwarted rebellion against Henry's daughter Mary I, for which he was executed. The rebellion's aim was to set on the throne the Protestant-minded Elizabeth, the daughter of Anne Boleyn. Wyatt was an ancestor of Wallis Simpson, wife of the Duke of Windsor, formerly King Edward VIII. Thomas Wyatt's great-grandson was Virginia Colony governor Sir Francis Wyatt.
