= Allington Castle =

Historic castle in Kent, England

- Allington, Kent, United Kingdom
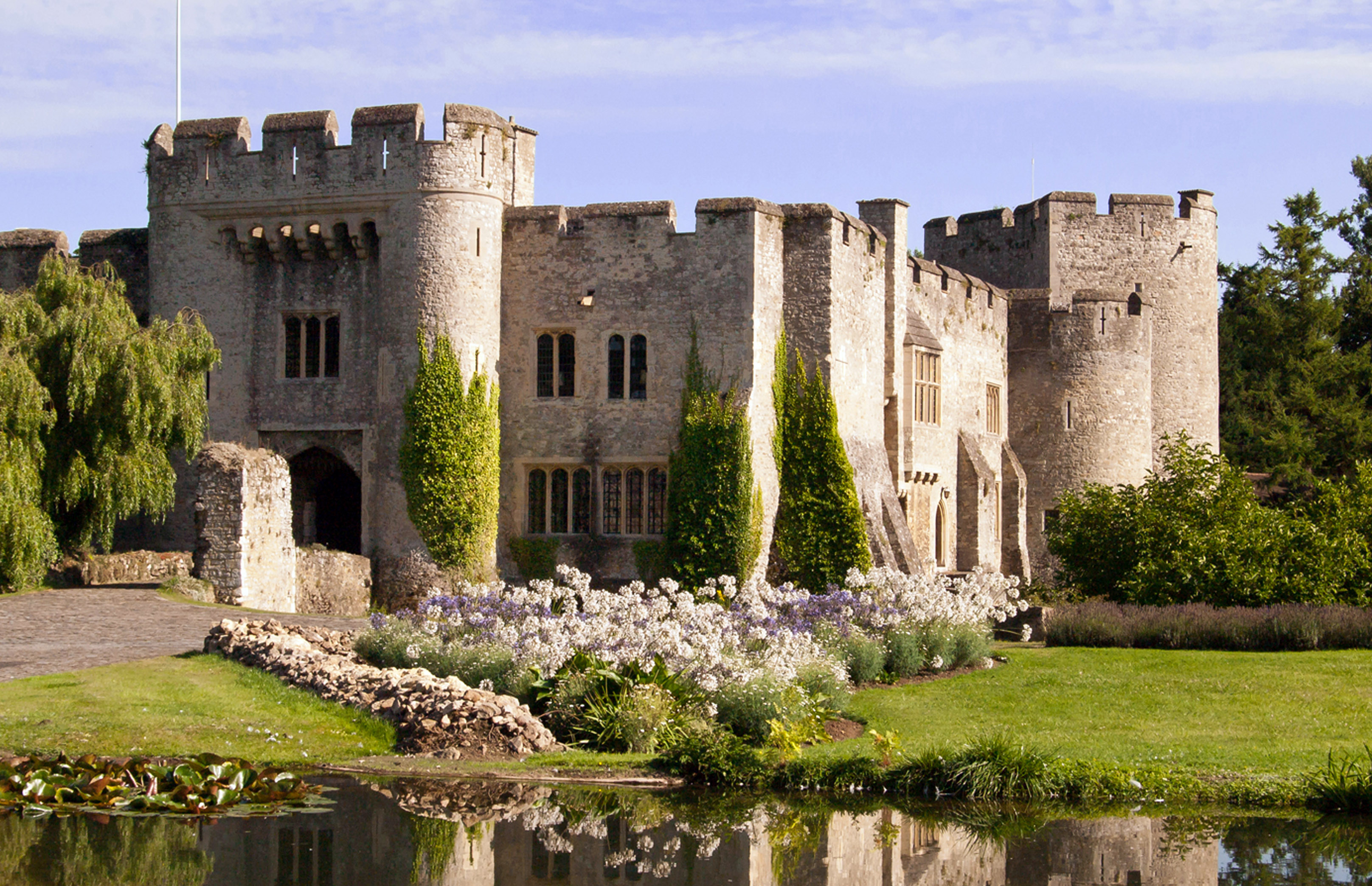
- View of Allington Castle

Site information
- Owner: Sir Robert Worcester
- Condition: Restored from ruins

Location
- Location within Kent
- Coordinates: 51°17′36″N 0°30′42″E

Site history
- Built: 1279-99
- Built by: Stephen de Pencester

Allington Castle is a stone castle in Allington, Kent, just north of Maidstone, in England. The first castle on the site was an unauthorised fortification, built during "The Anarchy" (1135–1153) and torn down later in the century when royal control was reasserted. It was replaced by a manor house, which was fortified with royal permission in the 13th century. Various alterations and expansions were made by successive owners over the following two centuries.

The property was developed into a fortified compound with six towers at irregular intervals along the curtain wall and domestic buildings in the interior, including one of the first long galleries built in England. In 1554 it was seized by the Crown in the course of dispossessing its owner, Sir Thomas Wyatt the Younger, after the failure of his rebellion against Queen Mary.

The castle entered a state of decay that was accelerated by fires, neglect and vandalism, until it was largely ruined by the start of the 20th century. It was saved and restored by the efforts of Sir Martin Conway and his wife during the first half of the century. After nearly 50 years of occupation by a community of Carmelite friars and nuns, it returned to being a private residence in 1999 and was the home of Sir Robert Worcester, the founder of the MORI polling company, until his death in 2025. It is a Grade I listed building and is used as a wedding venue, though there is no public access other than occasional tours involving trips from Maidstone town centre on the Kentish Lady river boat.

== History ==
=== 12th to 15th century ===
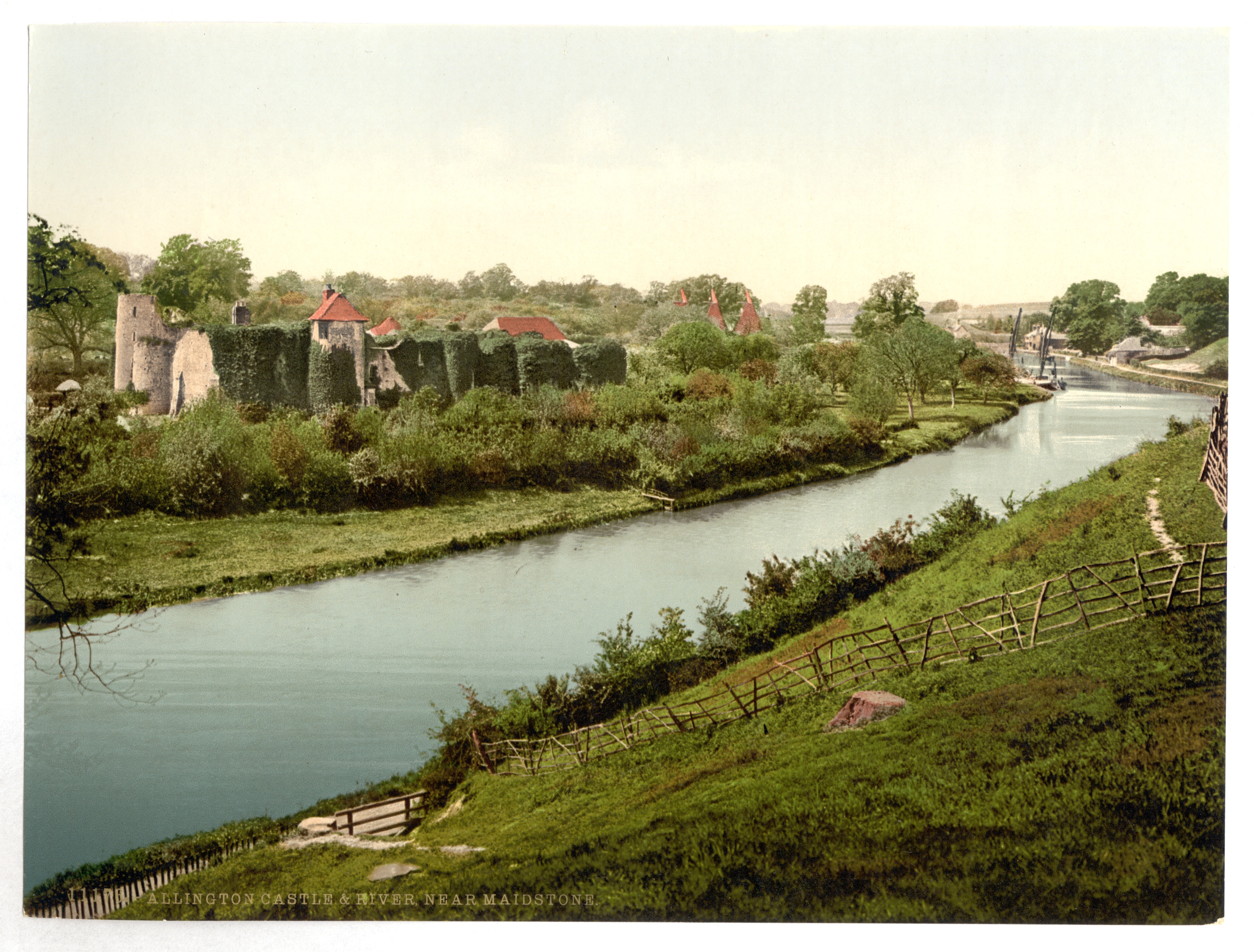
1890s view of Allington Castle, illustrating its riverside location

The first castle was built by William de Warenne, 2nd Earl of Surrey during the reign of King Stephen in the first half of the 12th century. It took the form of a moated mound (possibly a motte and bailey) built on a site adjoining a bend in the River Medway about one mile (1.6 km) north of Maidstone. The fortification was subsequently expanded but as it was an unauthorised adulterine castle, Henry II ordered its demolition (slighting) in 1174. It was replaced with a small unfortified manor house. According to historian Sidney Painter, it was one of at least 21 castles demolished on Henry II's instructions.

The present castle was built between 1279 and 1299 by Stephen de Pencester, the Lord Warden of the Cinque Ports, who was granted a licence to crenellate the existing manor house by Edward I. It was inherited by Penchester's daughter and passed via marriage to the Cobham family, who owned it until 1492. The building's development was continued in the early 13th century by Sir Henry de Cobham, incorporating the remains of the old manor house into the new castle. Although it was fortified, it was more of a residence than a fortress, as indicated by its extensive – and early – use of brick, which may have reflected Stephen's interests in a brickyard in Essex. It seems to have been neglected subsequently; it is described by documentary sources as being in a very bad condition by 1398–99.

=== Tenure of the Wyatts ===
Allington Castle was acquired in 1492 by Sir Henry Wyatt, a prominent supporter of Henry Tudor, who in 1485 had become King Henry VII. He undertook major alterations, dividing the courtyard into two unequal parts by constructing a two-storeyed building which contained what may have been one of the first long galleries in England. He also added a half-timbered block adjoining the curtain wall, which was used as the castle's kitchens and stables. Henry VII visited it during Wyatt's tenure. Henry VIII also visited in 1527, 1530 and 1536, as did Cardinal Wolsey in 1527 and Katherine Parr in 1544. Henry was said to have been so concerned for his personal safety while staying in the castle's northeast tower that he had the single entry, a spiral staircase, blocked off by a dry stone wall each night that he was there.

Henry Wyatt's son, the poet Sir Thomas Wyatt, was born there in 1503, but in 1554 his son Sir Thomas Wyatt the Younger forfeited the castle after his unsuccessful rebellion against Queen Mary. The plotters had held their first meeting at the castle before marching to London; after the rebellion had been crushed, many of the failed rebels were imprisoned in the castle. Sir Thomas was executed, the Wyatts were deprived of the rest of their extensive estate, and the surviving members of the family emigrated to America.

=== Fall into ruin ===
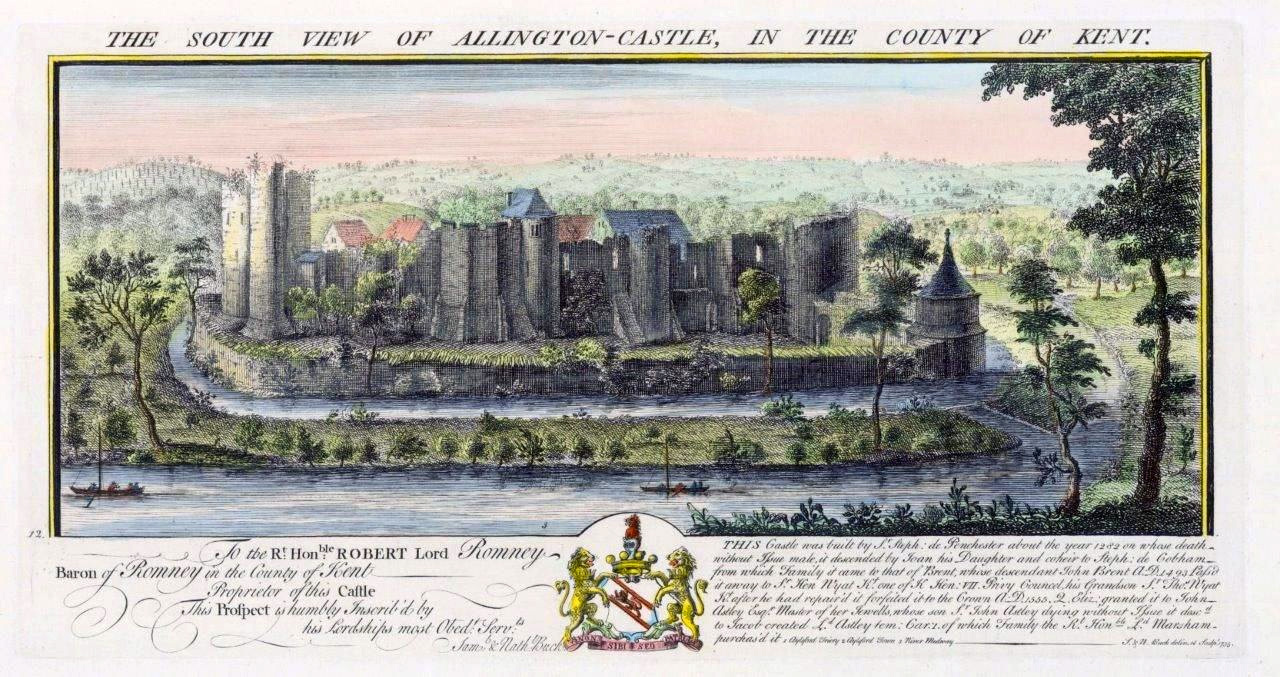
View of Allington Castle, 1735, by the Buck brothers.

The castle and manor were granted in 1568 to John Astley, Queen Elizabeth's Master of the Jewel House, though he did not live there. Around 1600, two farm houses were subsequently built in the grounds of Allington Castle while the rest of the castle gradually fell into ruin.

Most of the Great Hall and the northeast wing were destroyed in a disastrous fire in the second half of the 16th century. An early 17th-century lessee named John Best pulled down the battlements and added a half-timbered gabled second storey to the east and west wings as a replacement for the fire-damaged areas of the castle. The Bests were Catholics and used a room in the east tower as their private chapel. There is still a priest hole in the lodge of the gatehouse, a sign of the persecution that Catholics faced at the time.

Allington Castle was bought in 1720 by Sir Robert Marsham, the 2nd Baron Romney and a descendant of the Wyatts, but he did not live there and let it deteriorate. Its decaying appearance was recorded by J. M. W. Turner in sketches and watercolours made in 1798.

The top of the Long Gallery was destroyed in another fire in the early 19th century and the rest of the castle was nearly demolished a few decades later by Charles Marsham, 5th Earl of Romney. He was dissuaded by opposition from local residents, notably the Rector of the nearby Church of St. Lawrence, but by this time the castle was totally ruined. The Penchester wing was abandoned and used as a quarry for building materials, while the ground-floor remnants of the Long Gallery were converted into a pair of farmhouses.

=== Restoration ===
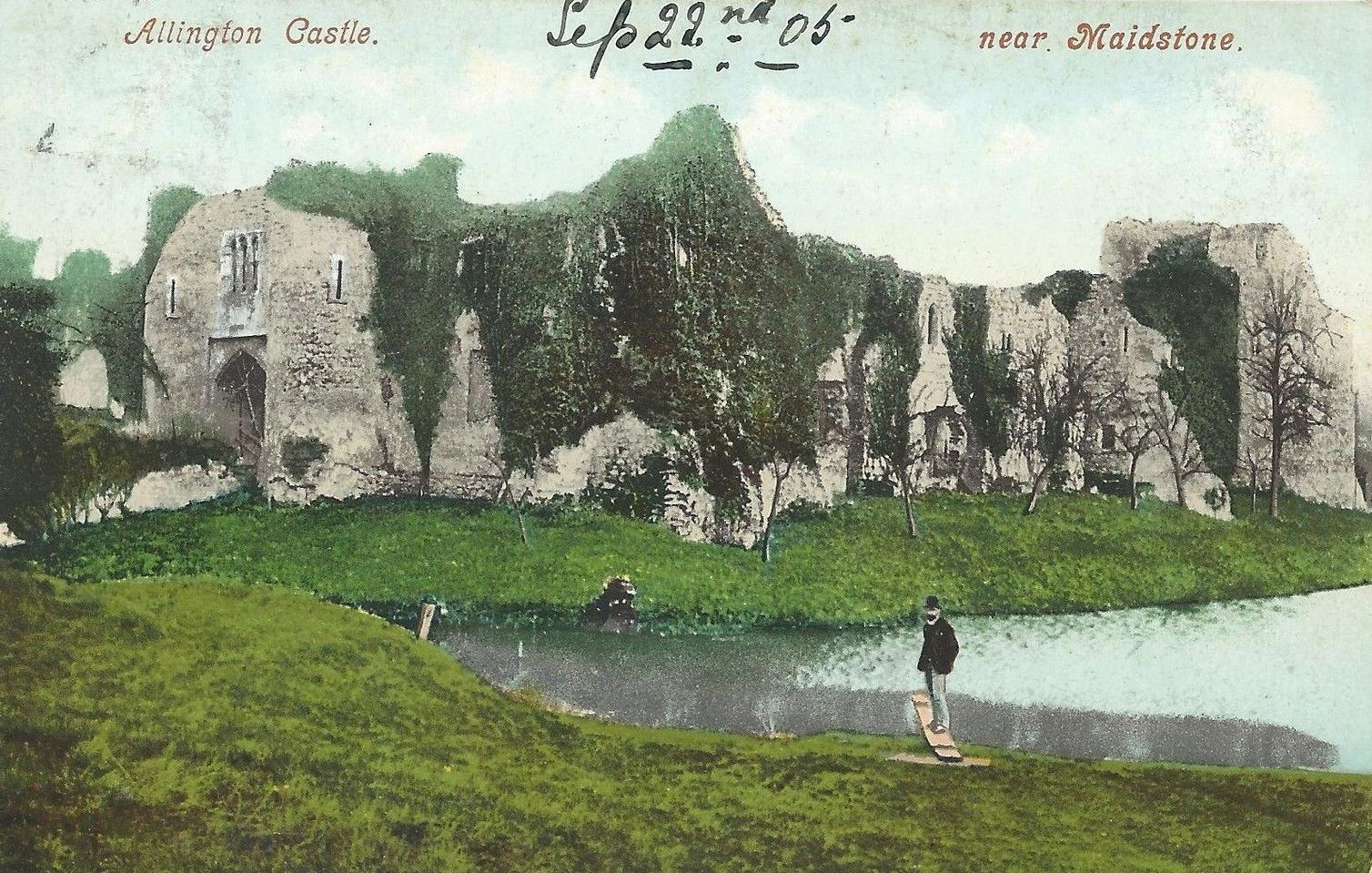
The ruins of the castle in 1905

In 1895, a retired London barrister named Dudley C. Falke rented the castle from Lord Romney and began the lengthy task of restoration. However, this proved too expensive for his resources. In 1905 he approached the distinguished mountaineer and cartographer Sir William Martin Conway (later Lord Conway), who he had heard was looking to buy an old castle or manor house. Conway had posted an advertisement in The Times stating: "Wanted to purchase, an old manor-house or abbey, built in the 16th century or earlier." The castle made a great impression on Conway and his American wife Katrina when they saw it for the first time:

Neither of us will ever forget the lovely June morning when we set forth to visit this faery castle on our way to Brighton. ... No sign of any castle could be seen (though we were evidently close up to the Medway) till we turned a corner, and there it was near at hand. Its walls and five visible towers were buried in ivy. Most of its moat had been filled in, but its reflection lay upon the calm face of the remaining fragment. ... The beauty of it all was entrancing. It took our breath away, and for a moment we were speechless. Then we both gasped out, Of course we must have it.

Conway decided to purchase the castle's freehold from Lord Romney at a cost of £4,800 and spent the next 30 years restoring it with the assistance of the architects W. D. Caroe and Philip Tilden. He was able to draw on his own and his wife's wealth, and his efforts were also supported by his wife's wealthy step-father, a businessman named Manton Marble. Corbens, a local building firm, was hired to carry out the work and provided traditional craftsmen to undertake the restoration in an architecturally and historically sympathetic style. Conway and his daughter Agnes, an archaeologist, also undertook extensive research into the history of the castle.

Much of the restoration had been completed by the start of the First World War in 1914. The gatehouse and the Penchester wing had been completely restored and most of the old keep had been completed as well. The Long Gallery was rebuilt and the Tudor house within the castle walls was linked to it. An old dovecot on the castle grounds was restored for use by Agnes Conway as a study. After the war, Lord Conway set about clearing the exterior of the castle from the ramshackle collection of rural buildings that had accumulated over the centuries just outside the walls. They were replaced with planted poplars and gardens built under Philip Tilden. The Great Hall was rebuilt by 1927, and the restoration of the northeast wing was completed by 1932.

Lord Conway died in 1937, whereupon Agnes inherited Allington Castle. By this time, the restoration work had ceased for lack of funds and the castle was leased between 1936 and 1946 to the politician and architect Alfred Bossom. Agnes Conway subsequently returned to it with her husband, George Horsfield. After Agnes died in 1950 the castle was sold by her husband to the Order of Carmelites from the nearby Aylesford Priory at a price of £15,000, and it became the home of a community of Carmelite Friars from March 1951. There was a certain amount of historical irony in this, as the Wyatts of Allington Castle had obtained Aylesford Priory and dispossessed its occupants during Henry VIII's Dissolution of the Monasteries; now the tables were turned.

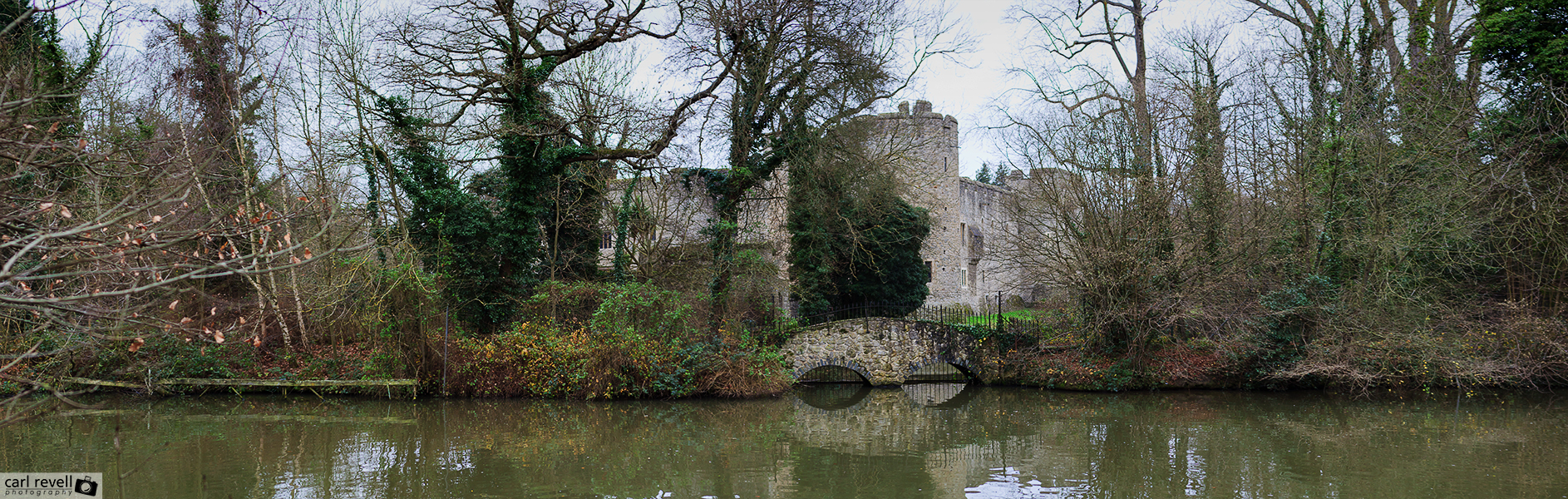
View of Allington Castle from the River Medway

The castle was managed between 1951 and 1958 by the Institute of Our Lady of Mount Carmel, which undertook a substantial programme of repairs and restoration. It subsequently became a centre for ecumenical work with the monastic community at Aylesford taking on responsibility for running it. Further renovations were undertaken to provide accommodation and facilities for the castle's inhabitants. In September 1972, Allington Castle became an independent priory. The friars eventually vacated the castle in 1999.. Sold for £900,000. It was the home of Sir Robert Worcester, the founder of the MORI polling company until 2025. The castle is not open to the public, but is used as a wedding venue.. Listed for sale in October 2025 for £5,000,000. It has been a Grade I listed building since 1951.

== Architecture ==
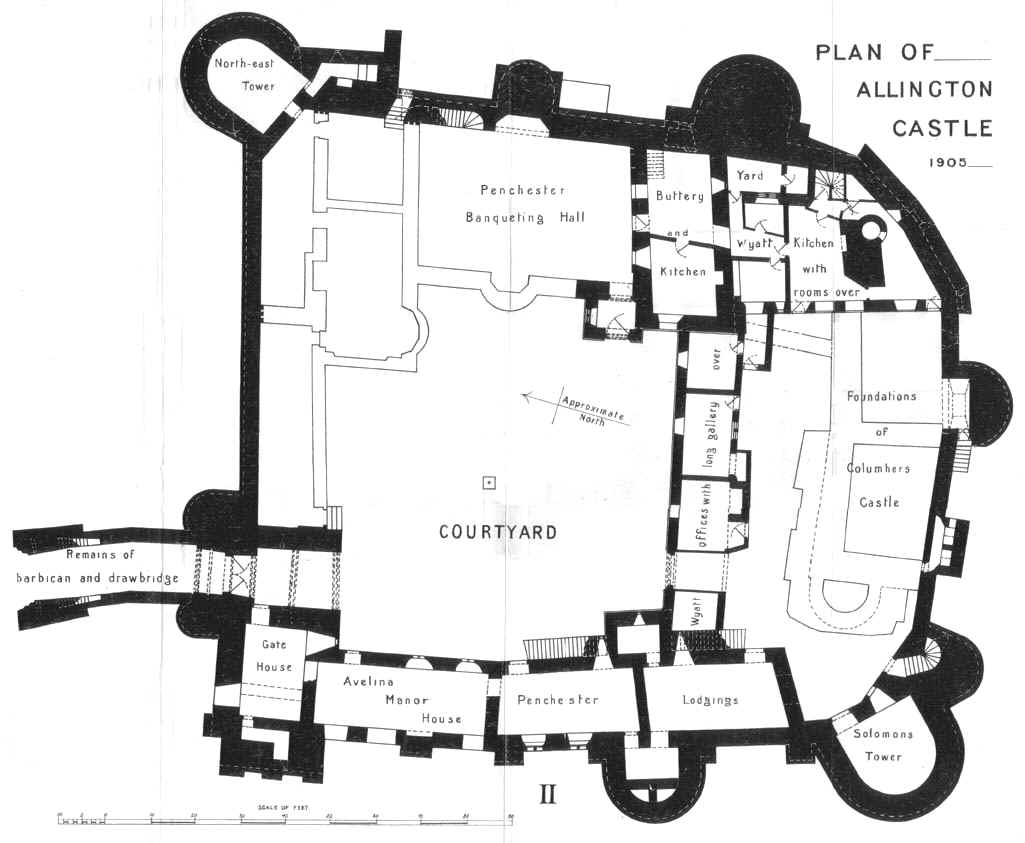
Plan of Allington Castle in 1906

Allington Castle takes the form of an irregular parallelogram with a curtain wall incorporating six round towers of various sizes. A gatehouse, incorporating the remains of the original manor house from which the castle developed, stands on the northwest side. The largest and most significant of the towers, the four-storeyed Solomon's Tower, projects from the southwest side of the curtain wall. Just to its north, adjoining the west curtain wall, is the Penchester Lodgings, one of two surviving ranges of early buildings, which may incorporate remains of the earlier manor house. The banqueting hall and main apartments stood against the east curtain wall. It has largely been reconstructed, though the 15th-century porch is original.

The interior of the castle was once a single large open space, but is divided into a large outer and a smaller inner courtyard. The latter was once occupied by buildings against the south curtain wall and appears to have been the site of the first castle on the site, judging by the remains of foundations discovered during Conway's restoration work. The range dividing the two courtyards contains the Long Gallery on the upper floor, with offices below. The buildings in the southeast corner were occupied by kitchens and a buttery with rooms above. The moat surrounding the castle was once flooded and was crossed by a drawbridge, with a portcullis closing the entrance to the castle. The ruins of a barbican can be seen on the far side of the moat. A short distance to the southwest of the castle is a low mound, which is all that survives of the 12th-century motte.

== In film ==
The castle was the site of the filming of the 1975 children's movie Robin Hood Junior, produced by the Children's Film Foundation (CFF) and starring Keith Chegwin as young Robin. The castle was depicted as the Locksley (or Loxley) Castle of Lord Gilbert during the Crusades era. In 1992 the ABC network aired the TV series, "Covington Cross" filmed at Allington Castle.

== In television ==
The Castle was the site of the filming of the 1965 episode "Castle De'ath" of The Avengers TV series.

In 1988 Paul Daniels presented a live Halloween Special featuring special guest Eugene Burger.

It was also used for external shots and views for the castle Covington Cross in the eponymously named 1992 TV series Covington Cross.

The CBBC historical sketch show Horrible Histories used the castle for the Richard III song.

The castle was one of several locations used for the E! TV series The Royals (2015–2018).

== In music ==
The castle was the site of the filming of the music video for "Lover Chanting" (released in 2018) by the Swedish band Little Dragon.
