= Explorers of the New Century =

2005 book by Magnus Mills

- First edition
- Author: Magnus Mills
- Language: English
- Genre: Adventure
- Publisher: Bloomsbury Publishing PLC (UK); Mariner Books (US)
- Publication date: September 2005
- Publication place: United Kingdom
- Media type: Print & eBook
- Pages: 192
- ISBN: 0-7475-8018-9
- Preceded by: The Scheme for Full Employment (2003)
- Followed by: The Maintenance of Headway (2009)

Explorers of the New Century is the fifth novel by Booker Prize shortlisted author Magnus Mills, published in 2005.

== Plot introduction ==
Two expeditions set out to be the first to reach "the Agreed Furthest Point", by two different routes. As they encounter rigorous conditions and difficulties along the way, things begin to unravel. In quintessential Magnus Mills fashion, nothing is as it first seems, and there are lessons to be learned — as well as surprises to anticipate...

== Reception ==
- The Complete Review's assessment was "nice twist, nice approach", all reviews "very mixed reactions (and a variety of interpretations)."
- David Grylls of the Sunday Times said, "As the book travels from the fatuous to the alarming, a fabular structure begins to emerge, hinting that themes of empire and exploitation, slavery and segregation, are being explored. Although the book remains teasingly vague, a political subtext surfaces. (...) But while the novel undoubtedly harbours darker elements, its most successful mode is deadpan humour."
