= Field of the Cloth of Gold =

1520 Anglo-French meeting in Calais, France

Coordinates: 50°51′8.28″N 1°55′22.44″E

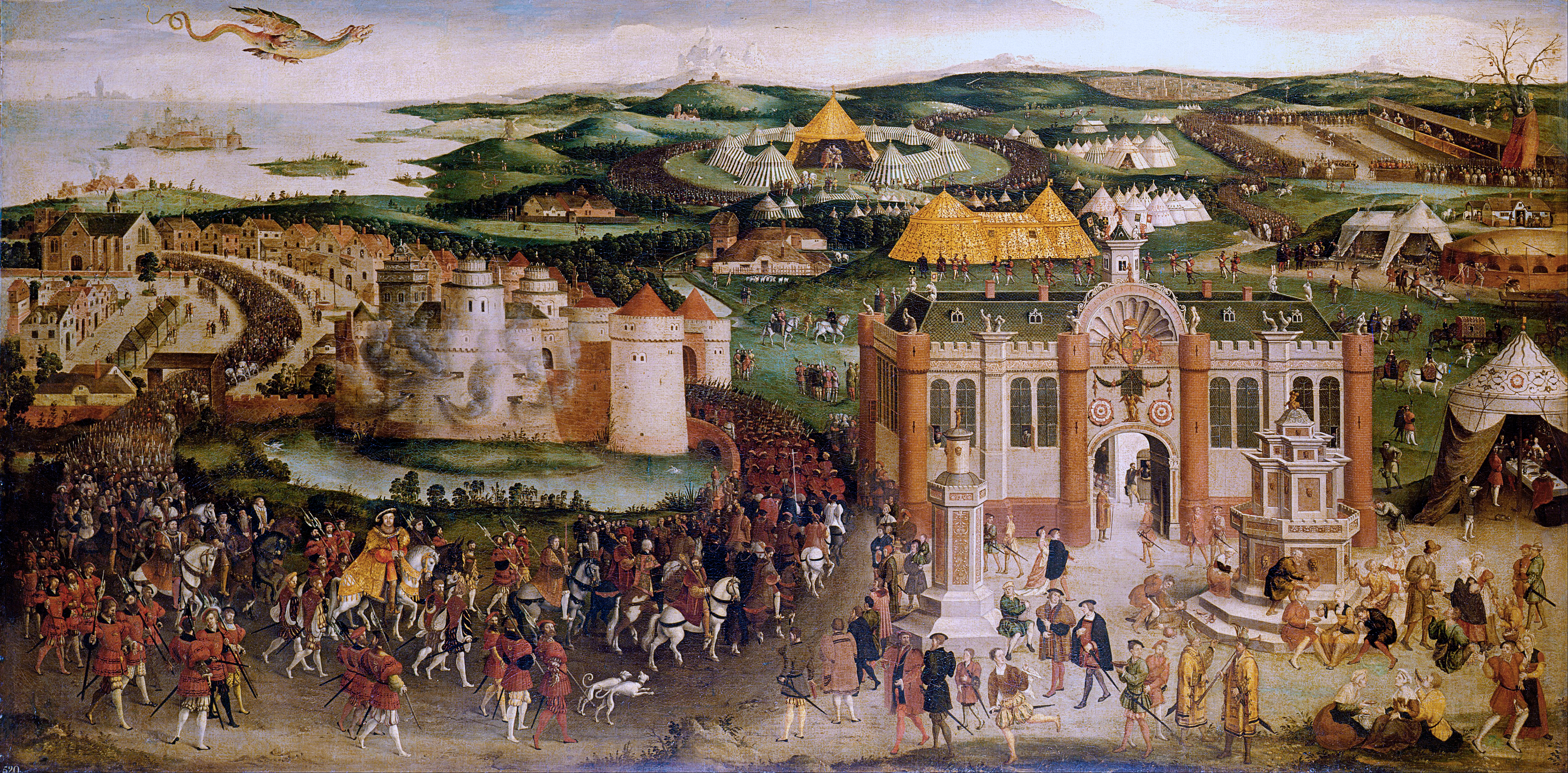
The Field of the Cloth of Gold, oil painting of circa 1545 in the Royal Collection at Hampton Court. Henry VIII on horseback approaches at bottom left.

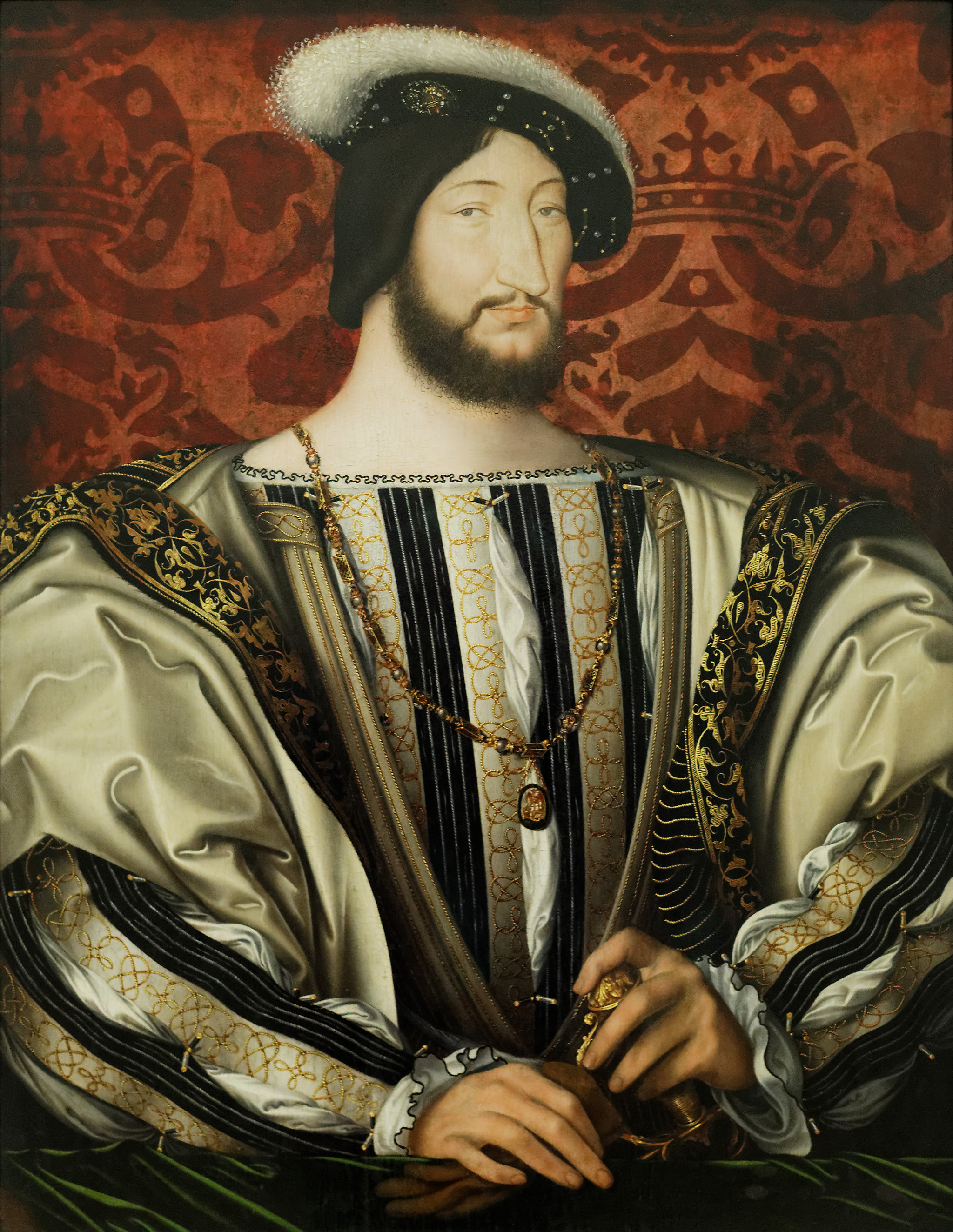
Francis I (portrait by Jean Clouet, Louvre Museum, Paris)

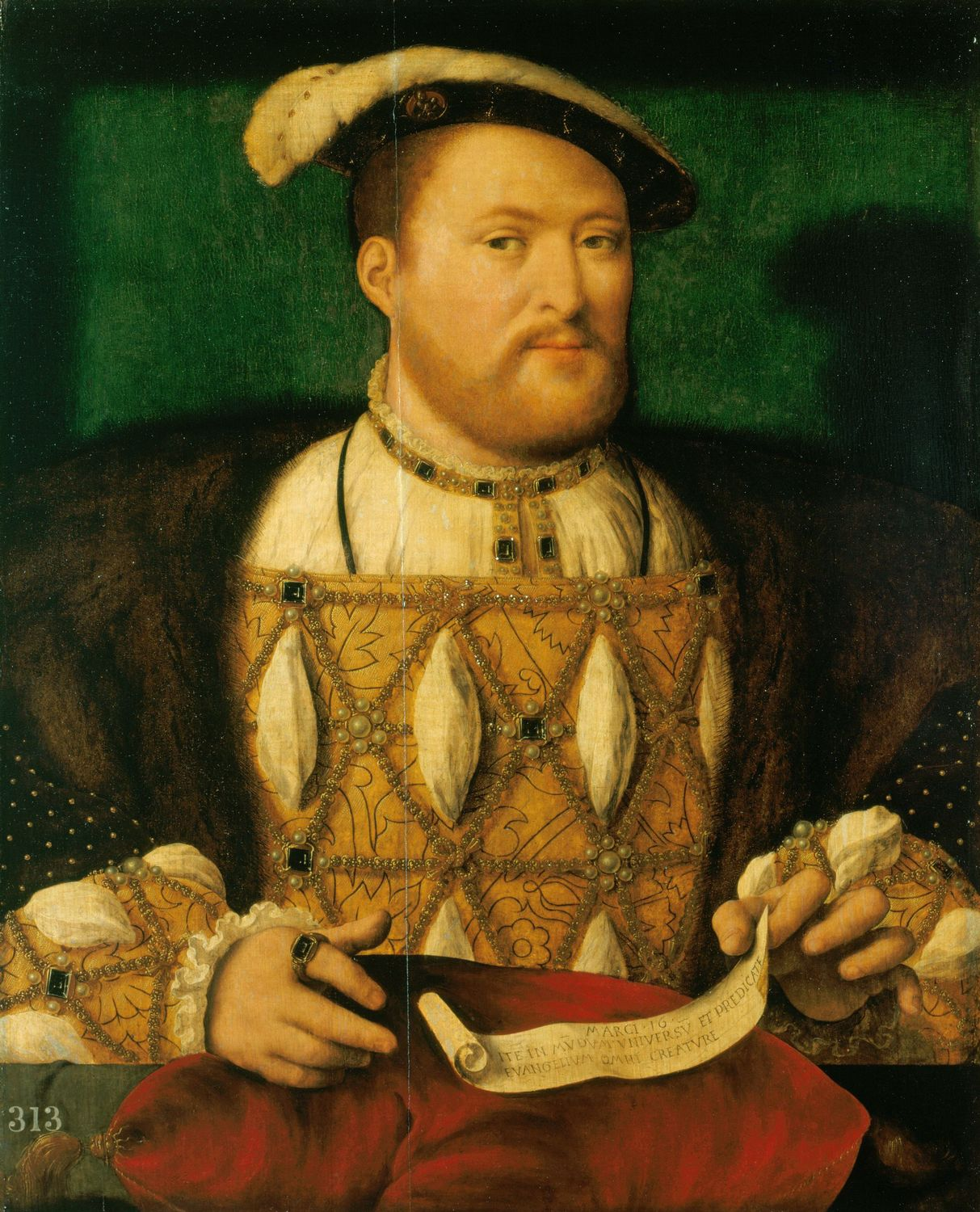
Henry VIII (portrait by Joos van Cleve, Royal Collection, Hampton Court)

The two monarchs who met at the Field of the Cloth of Gold
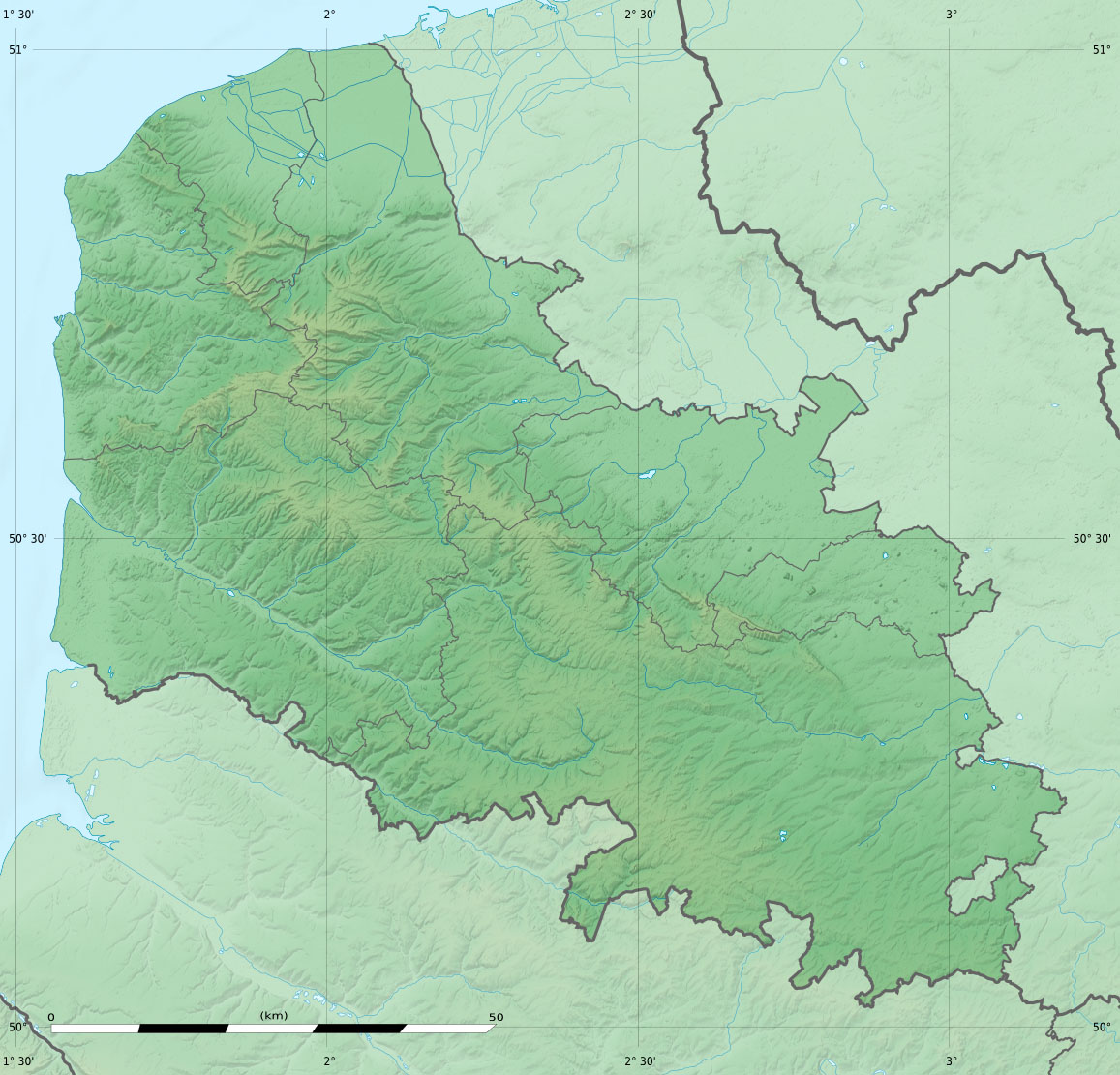
Location of the Field of the Cloth of Gold in the modern Pas-de-Calais

The Field of the Cloth of Gold (French: Camp du Drap d'Or, pronounced [kɑ̃ dy dʁa d‿ɔʁ]) was a summit meeting between King Henry VIII of England and King Francis I of France from 7 to 24 June 1520. Held at Balinghem, between Ardres in France and Guînes in the English Pale of Calais, it was an opulent display of wealth by both kings.

The summit was arranged to increase the bond of friendship between the two kings following the Anglo-French treaty of 1514. The two monarchs would meet again in 1532 to arrange Francis's assistance in pressuring Pope Clement VII to pronounce Henry's first marriage as illegitimate. Under the guidance of English Cardinal Thomas Wolsey, these European states sought to outlaw war forever among Christian peoples.

The Pale of Calais, home to the meeting in Balinghem, was the final English possession in France. This territorial leftover from the Hundred Years' War caused some tensions between the English and French, as the latter preferred a location closer to the border.

== Background ==
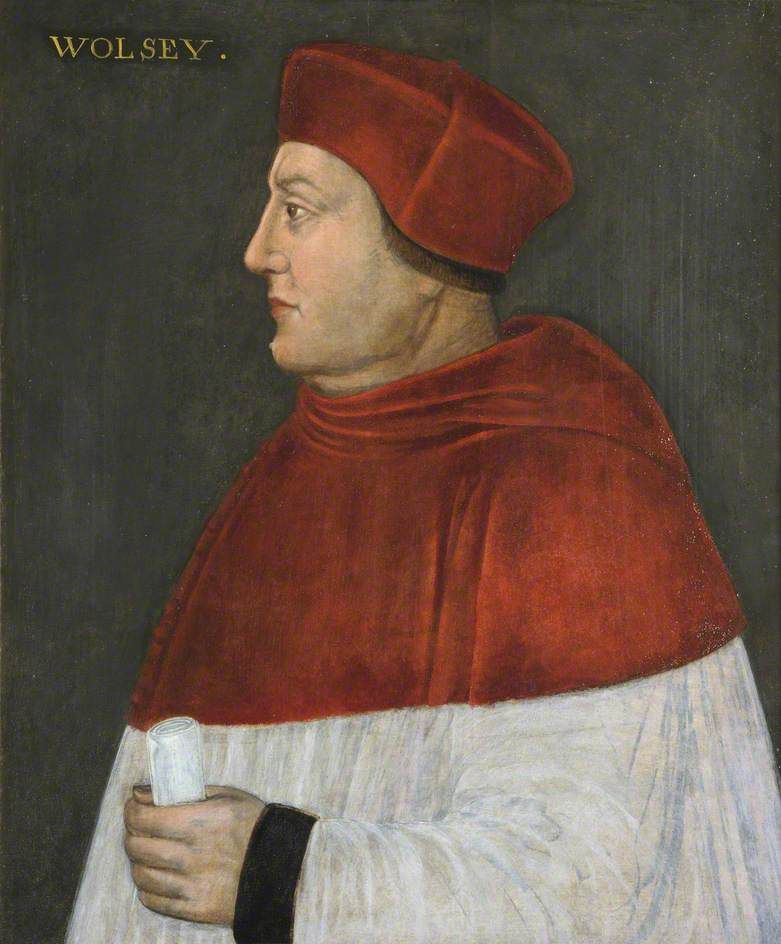
Cardinal Wolsey

Two entities had started to emerge as powers in Western Europe at this time: France, under Francis I, and the Habsburg-dominated Holy Roman Empire, under Charles V, Holy Roman Emperor. The Kingdom of England, still a lesser power, was being courted as an ally by the two major powers. The 1518 Treaty of London, a non-aggression pact between major European powers to help resist the Ottoman expansion into southeastern Europe, had just been signed. Henry also held meetings with Charles V a month before the Field of Cloth of Gold in the Netherlands and again afterwards at Calais, Henry's only possession on the Continent.

Both Henry and Francis wished to be seen as Renaissance princes. Renaissance thinking held that a strong ruler could choose peace from a place of strength. The meeting was designed to show how magnificent each court was, and how this could be a basis for mutual respect and peace between states that were traditional enemies. Henry and Francis were also figures of similar age and dashing reputation, so there was almost certainly a mutual curiosity.

Everything was arranged to provide equality between the two groups. The meeting place (now indicated by a commemorative plaque on the D231 road, Route de Marquise) was at the very edge of the English territory around Calais. The valley where the first meeting took place was landscaped to provide areas of equal elevation for the two government parties. The whole event was planned and executed by English Cardinal Thomas Wolsey, a charismatic, eloquent master diplomat who as a papal legate had immense power in the name of Pope Leo X at the time of the meeting. Included among the English guests were Thomas More and Anne Boleyn's mother and sister.

An earlier meeting between the kings of England and France presaged this one. From 27 to 30 October 1396, Charles VI of France and Richard II of England met at Ardres near Calais to forge a peace treaty during the Hundred Years' War. The scale, splendour and pageantry were comparable to the later Field of the Cloth of Gold meeting held on the same site in 1520.

== The meeting ==
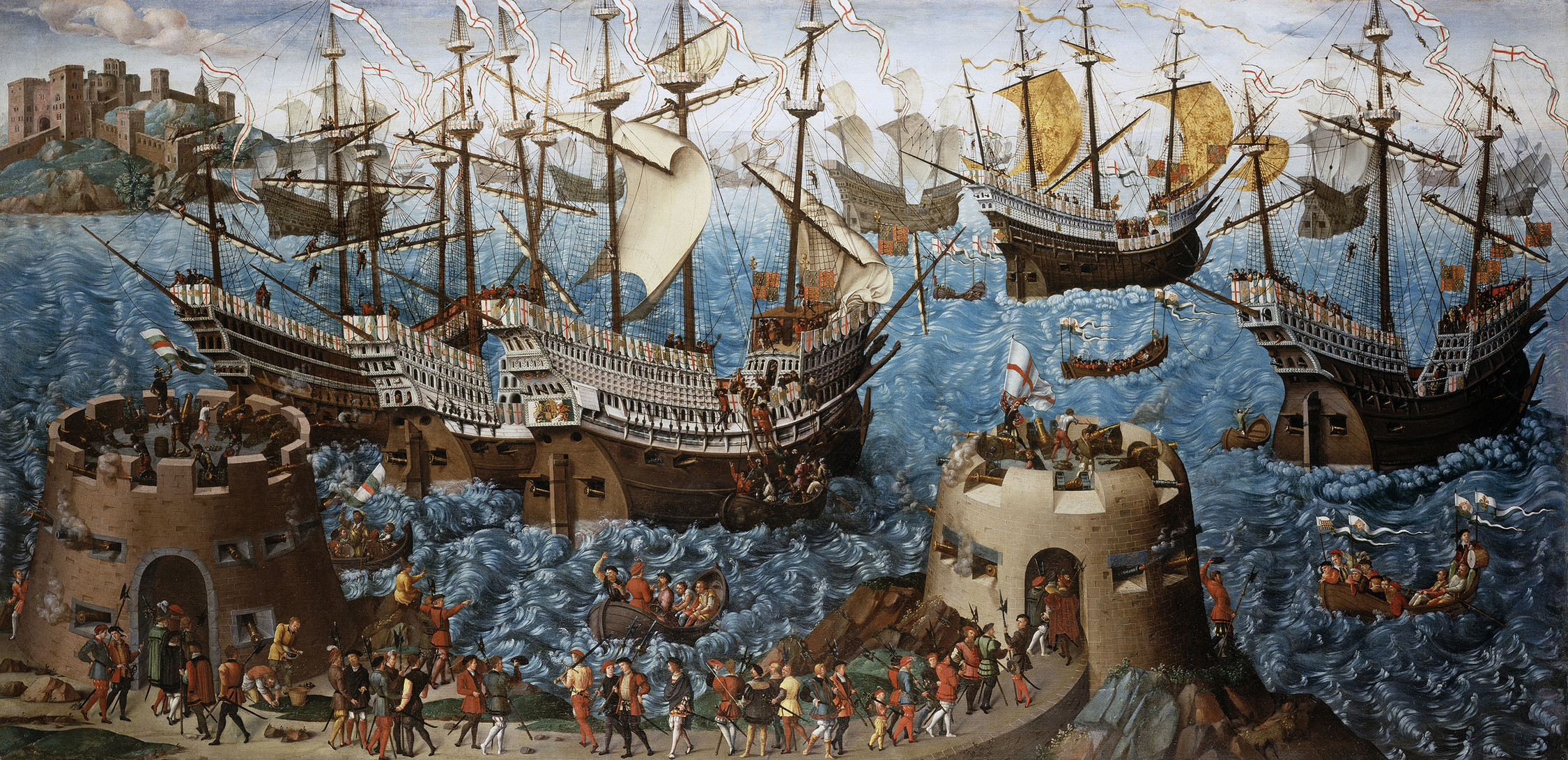
Henry VIII embarking at Dover. Dover Castle is depicted at top left. Royal Collection, Hampton Court Palace.

Each king tried to outshine the other, with dazzling tents and clothes, huge feasts, music, jousting and games. The tents and the costumes displayed so much cloth of gold, an expensive fabric woven with silk and gold thread, that the site of the meeting was named after it. The English procession reportedly included up to 4,000 troops, with the King centrally placed for protection and ceremony, while the French procession was slightly smaller but carefully arranged to match the English display. Specially constructed mounds ensured each side assembled at equal height, reflecting both security concerns and ceremonial precision.

English sources record that 250,000 fish, 98,000 eggs, 2,000 sheep, 700 conger eels, 13 swans, 3 porpoises and 66,000 liters of beer was served. Contemporary critics like Bishop Fisher saw the Field of the Cloth of Gold as a lavish but politically fleeting spectacle, while French accounts framed it as a demonstration of Francis I's personal bravery and diplomatic skill.

The most elaborate arrangements were made for the accommodation of the two monarchs and their large retinues; and on Henry's part especially no efforts were spared to make a great impression in Europe with this meeting. Before the castle of Guînes, a temporary palace covering an area of nearly 12,000 square yards (10,000 m^{2}) was erected for the reception of the English king. The palace was in four blocks with a central courtyard; each side was 328 feet (100 m) long. The only solid part was the brick base about 8 feet (2.4 m) high. Above the brickwork, the 30-foot-high (9.1 m) walls were made of cloth or canvas on timber frames, painted to look like stone or brick.

One further aspect of King Henry's retinue was the presence of two royal monkeys covered in gold leaf; these were known to have been gifts from the Ottoman Sultan Selim I and brought much laughter and merriment from Francis I as contemporary Cardinal Wolsey recounts, "The French King was overcome with much curiosity playing with those little knaves that did all they could to steal and pester his advisers, yet he willed them to be present at every banquet". The slanting roof was made of oiled cloth painted to give the colour of lead and the illusion of slates. Contemporaries commented especially on the huge expanse of glass, which made visitors feel they were in the open air. Chronicle descriptions make it clear the decorations, carved and painted had martial iconography;

The foregate of the same palace or place with great and mighty masonry by sight was arched, with a Tower on every side of the same portered by great craft, and inbatteled was the gate and Tower, and in the fenesters, and windows, were images resembling men of warre redie to cast great stones: also the same gate or Tower was set with compassed images of ancient Princes, as Hercules, Alexander and other, by entrayled worke, richly limned with gold and Albyn colours, .... also the tower of the Gate as seemed was built by great masonry, ... for the sundrie countenances of every Image that their appeared, some shooting, some casting, some ready to strike, and firing of gonnes, which shewed very honourably.

— Grafton's Chronicle, or Chronicle at Large 1569

Galyon Hone was one of the stained-glass artists employed at the Field. The building was decorated in the most sumptuous fashion and furnished with a profusion of golden ornaments. Red wine flowed from the two fountains outside. The chapel was served by 35 priests. Composer Jean Mouton was most likely in charge of the musical production by Francis I; the French royal chapel had one of the finest choirs in Europe, and contemporary accounts indicated that they "delighted their hearers." The wooden ceiling for one of the tents may later have been installed in the New Chapel at Ightham Mote in Kent where, with its colours faded, one with appropriate features can still be seen. Musical production on the English side was probably led by composer William Cornysh the Younger, master of the Royal Chapel for Henry VIII.

Some idea of the size of Henry's following may be gathered from the fact that in one month 2,200 sheep and other viands in a similar proportion were consumed. In the fields beyond the castle, 2,800 tents were erected for less distinguished visitors.

Journeying from Calais, Henry reached his headquarters at Guînes on Monday, 4 June 1520, and Francis took up his residence at Ardres. After Cardinal Wolsey, with a splendid train, had visited the French king, the two monarchs met at the Val d'Or, a spot midway between the two places, on Thursday, 7 June Corpus Christi.

The following days were taken up with tournaments, in which both kings took part. There were banquets in which the kings entertained each other's queens. The many other entertainments included archery displays and wrestling between Breton and Cornish wrestlers.

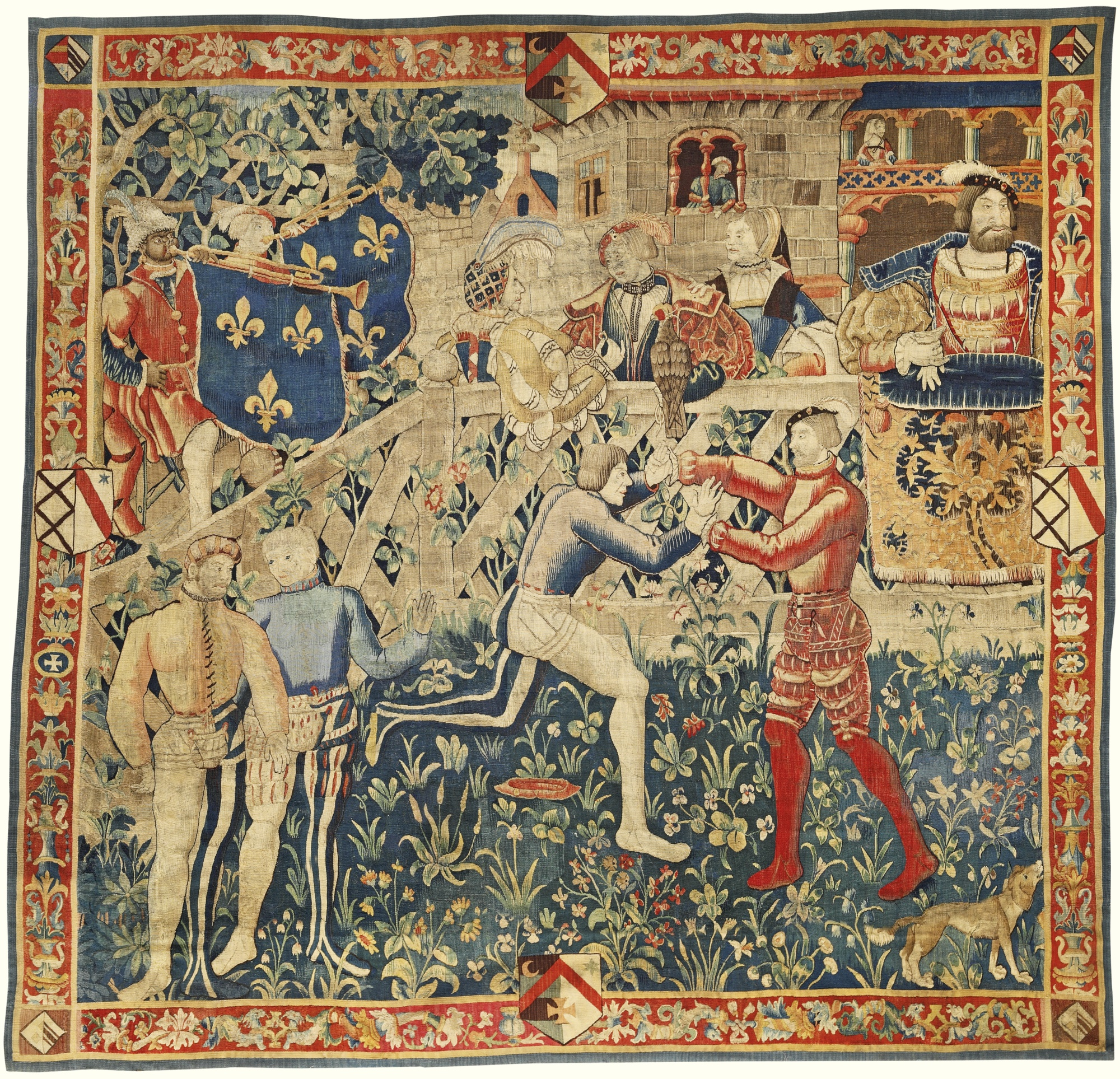
Wrestling at the Field of the Cloth of Gold (tapestry, c. 1520). Francis I is shown top right, above an actual cloth of gold.

Wolsey said Mass and the two sovereigns separated on Sunday, 24 June, the feast-day of St John the Baptist. The painting depicts a dragon flying overhead and this could be interpreted to mean that the Mass itself was interrupted by a mysterious event thought to be a dragon flying over the congregation. The superstitious would have viewed this as a great portent, but it was probably a firework accidentally or deliberately set off. Alternatively the dragon in the painting could be interpreted as symbolic, perhaps representing a highly romanticized salamander (the symbol of Francis) or a portent of doom, signifying that for all its glamour, the summit was to prove largely fruitless. The sermon was read by Richard Pace, an intimate friend of Erasmus. Wolsey gave a general indulgence for all present.

Catherine of Aragon was noted to attend some events, including a joust, wearing costume in Spanish fashion. Her Spanish hairstyle, with a plait of hair encased in jewelled tranzado coif, would have appeared very different to English and French women. This clothing choice at the Field of the Cloth of Gold emphasized her affinity with Spain and advocacy for Spanish policy. In England her clothes were not always made in this Spanish fashion.

== Consequences ==
This meeting made a great impression on contemporaries, but its political results were very minor. While the carefully established rules of the tournament stated that the two kings would not compete against each other, Henry surprisingly challenged Francis in a wrestling match, but it turned sour for Henry when he quickly lost.

Relations between the two countries worsened soon after the event when Cardinal Wolsey arranged an alliance with Charles V, who declared war on France later that year commencing the Italian War of 1521–26.

== List of participants ==
A record of the list of participants survives in at least two places: in the Rutland Papers and in the Letters and Papers, Foreign and Domestic, of King Henry VIII, catalogued as Letters indented specifying, in accordance with the treaty of 12 March 1519, the number and rank of the lords, ladies and gentlemen to attend the King and Queen at the interview with Francis I. The latter source lists the following:

=== For King Henry VIII ===
John de Vere, 14th Earl of Oxford with his wife Anne Howard, daughter of Thomas Howard, 2nd Duke of Norfolk attended Henry VIII, where he was the judges of the foot races. "For the King: The cardinal of York, with 300 servants, of whom 12 shall be chaplains and 50 gentlemen, with 50 horses; one archbishop with 70 servants, of whom 5 shall be chaplains and 10 gentlemen, with 30 horses; 2 dukes, each with 70 servants, 5 to be chaplains and 10 gentlemen, with 30 horses. 1 marquis with 56 servants, 4 to be chaplains and 8 gentlemen; 26 horses. 10 earls, each with 42 servants, 3 to be chaplains and 6 gentlemen; 20 horses. 5 bishops, of whom the bishop of Winchester shall have 56 servants, 4 to be chaplains and 8 gentlemen; 26 horses;—each of the others, 44 servants, 4 to be chaplains and 6 gentlemen; 20 horses. 20 barons, each to have 22 servants, 2 to be chaplains and 2 gentlemen; 12 horses. 4 knights of the order of St. George, each to have 22 servants, 2 to be chaplains and 2 gentlemen; 48 horses. 70 knights, including Sir William Mathew, grandson of Sir David Ap Mathew of Wales. Each knight to have 12 servants, one to be a chaplain; 8 horses. Councillors of the long robe; viz., the King's secretary, the vice-chancellor, the dean of the Chapel, and the almoner, each to have 12 servants, one a chaplain, and 8 horses. 12 King's chaplains, each with 6 servants and 3 horses. 12 serjeants-at-arms, each with 1 servant and two horses. 200 of the King's guard with 100 horses. 70 grooms of the chamber, with 150 servants and 100 horses among them; 266 officers of the house, with 216 servants and 70 horses; 205 grooms of the stable and of the armories, with 211 horses. The earl of Essex, being earl marshal, shall have, beside the number above stated, 130 servants and 100 light horses. Sum total of the King's company, 3,997 people and 2,087 horses".

=== For Queen Catherine of Aragon ===
"For the Queen: 1 duchess, with 4 women, 6 servants and 12 horses; 10 countesses, with 3 women and 4 servants, and 8 horses each; 12 baronesses, with 2 women, 3 servants and 6 horses each. 20 knights' ladies, with 1 woman, 2 servants and 4 horses each; 14 ladies, with 1 woman, 2 servants and 3 horses each; 6 ladies of the chamber, with 1 servant and 2 horses each; 1 earl, with 42 servants, 3 to be chaplains and 9 gentlemen; horses 20. 3 bishops, to have 44 servants, 4 to be chaplains and 6 gentlemen; horses 60. 4 barons, with 22 servants, 2 to be chaplains and 2 gentlemen; horses 48. 30 knights, with 12 servants, 1 to be a chaplain; horses 240; 6 chaplains with 3 servants and 2 horses each. Grooms 50, officers of the King's chamber, with 20 servants and 30 horses; officers of the King's stable 60, with 70 horses. Sum total of the Queen's company, 1,175 people and 778 horses.

=== Commissioners ===
"Names of those appointed to attend the king of England at the Congress:

==== Commissioners to oversee followers of French King ====
Commissioners appointed to oversee those who shall accompany the king of France:—The earl of Essex, Lord Abergavenny, Sir Edw. Ponynges, Sir Rob. Wingfield.

==== Commissioners to give orders to the gentlemen ====
Commissioners to give orders to the gentlemen:—Sir Edw. Belknapp, Sir Nich. Vaux, Sir John Peche, Sir Maurice Berkeley.

==== Commissioners to give orders to the foot soldiers ====
Commissioners to give orders to the foot soldiers:—Sir Weston Browne, Sir Edw. Ferys, Sir Rob. Constable, Sir Ralph Egerton, Sir Thomas Lucy, Sir John Marney.

=== Other attendees ===
==== At the embracing of the two kings ====
To ride with the king of England at the embracing of the two kings:—The Legate, Archbishop of Canterbury, dukes of Buckingham and Suffolk, marquis of Dorset. Bishops:—Durham, Armagh, Ely, Chichester, Rochester, Exeter, Hereford. Earls:—Stafford, Northumberland, Westmoreland, Shrewsbury, Worcester, Devon, Kent, Wiltshire, Derby, Kildare. Barons:—Maltravers, Montagu, Herbert, the grand prior of St. John of England, Roos, Fitzwalter, Hastings, Delaware, Dacre, Ferrers, Cobham, Daubeney, Lumley, Sir Henry Marney, Sir Wm. Sandys, Thomas Boleyn, Lord Howard.

=== Order of procession ===
The servants of the king of England shall march next their King, preceded by the nobles and gentlemen of the Legate, who shall follow the gentlemen of the other lords. The King's guard to follow him in their accustomed places.

=== Attendants of King Francis I ===
==== At meeting of two kings ====
The names of those who will be with the French king when he meets the king of England: the king of Navarre; dukes of Alençon, Bourbon, Vendôme and Lorraine; count of Saint Pol; prince de La-Roche-sur-Yon; Jean d'Albret, count of Dreux and Rethel, Sieur d'Orval and governor of Champagne; count of Benon, sieur de la Tremoille, first Chamberlain, admiral of Guyenne and governor of Burgundy; count of Étampes and Caravats, sieur de Boissy, grand master and governor of the Dauphin [died 1519]; Bonnivet, admiral of France; the viscount of Lautrec, La Palisse and Châtillon, marshals; count of Guise, brother of the duke of Lorraine; the bastard of Savoy, count of Villars and Beaufort, governor of Provence; count of Laval; mons. Jean de Laval-Châteaubriant; Claude de Rieux, count of Harcourt; princes of Orange and Tallemont; mons. de Nevers; mons d'Esparrox, lieutenant of Guyenne, and count of Montfort; Mess. de Lescun and Montmorency; le Grand Écuyer; counts de la Chambre, Tonnerre, Brienne, Jean III de Sainte-Maure, Joigny, Bremie and Mont Reuel; mons. d'Albret. The other knights of the Order. The king's household, 200 gentlemen; St. Vallier and the grand seneschal of Normandy, captains. 400 archers of the guard, and 4 captains; 100 Swiss, De Florenges, captain; maîtres d'hôtel, pannetiers, valets, &c.; gentlemen of the council and of the finances. The other pensioners will remain in their houses. Francis will bring with him the above company if the king of England thinks it suitable; but if not, he will diminish it. These noblemen will only have with them about 200 horses.

==== English attendants of English King ====
Noblemen's names that shall accompany the French (sic) (English?) king at the meeting at Calais. The King's Council. My lord Cardinal. The Privy Seal. The bishops of Lincoln, Norwich, Hereford and Rochester. The dukes of Norfolk and Buckingham. The marquis Dorset. The earls of Surrey, Shrewsbury, Worcester, Derby, Northumberland, Essex and Wiltshire. The lords of St. John, Burgevenny, Devonshire, Montague, Mounteagle, Cobham, Ferrers, Fitzwalter, Dudley, Dacres of the South, Darcy, Conyers, Audeley, Broke and Fitzwarren. The deans of the Chapel and of St Paul's. The archdeacon of Richmond. The dean of Salisbury. Dr. Syxtyne. Dr. Clark. The abbots of Glastonbury, Westminster, Bury and Winchecombe. All knights and others of the King's council. The secretaries in Latin, French and English. The clerks of the Privy Seal and Signet. The heralds. The officers of the household. The minstrels.

===== County representatives =====
- Bedford:—Sir John St. John, Wm. Gascoyn, Robt. Spenser, Lenthorp, Wm. Fitzjeffrey, Geo. Harvy.
- Berkshire:—Sir Geo. Forster, Sir Thos. Fetyplace, Sir Wm. Essex, Sir Richard Weston, Hen. Bridges, John Cheyny, Ric. Noreys, Ric. Hampden.
- Buckingham:—Sir Andrew Windsor, Sir Rauf Verney, junr., John Cheynye, Sir Wm. Hampden, John Gyfford.
- Cambridge:—Sir Wm. Findern, Sir Rob. Coton, Sir Rauf Chamberlain, Sir Giles Alyngton.
- Cheshire:—Sir John Warberton, Sir Wm. Both, Sir John Warren, Sir Geo. Holford, Sir John Lye of Bagley, Sir Wm. Brereton.
- Cornwall:—Lord Broke, Sir John Arundell, Sir Piers Eggecombe, Sir Roger Graynefeld, Sir John Trevenyan (Trevelyan).
- Derby:—Sir Henry Sacheverell, Sir John Montgomery, Sir Godfrey Fulgeham (Foljambe), Thos. Cokyn (Cockayne).
- Devonshire:— Lord FitzWaren, feudal baron of Bampton (i.e. John Bourchier, 1st Earl of Bath (1470–1539), created Earl of Bath in 1536); Sir William Courtenay (1477–1535) "The Great" of Powderham; Sir Edmund Owen; Sir John Basset (1462–1528) of Umberleigh; "Sir Nic. Kyrkeham" (possibly Nicholas Kirkham the 2nd son of Nicholas Kirkham (1433/4-1516) of Blagdon, Paignton. His sister Margaret Kirkham married firstly to John Cheney of Pinhoe, whose sister Cecily Cheney was the mother of Sir William Courtenay (1477–1535) "The Great" of Powderham); and Sir Edward Pomeroy (1478–1538) feudal baron of Berry Pomeroy.
- Dorset.—Hen. Strangwyshe, Giles Strangwyshe, John Horsey, Sir Thos. Trenchard.
- Essex:—The Earl of Essex, Lord FitzWalter, Sir Henry Marny, Sir John Raynysford, Sir Thos. Tyrell, Sir Ric. Lewys, Sir Roger Wentworth, Wm. Pirton, Sir Whitstan Browne, John Marnye.
- Gloucester:—The Duke of Buckingham, Sir Maurice Barkeley, William Denys, Sir Wm. Kyngston, Sir Christopher Baynham, Sir John Hungerford, Sir Edw. Wadham, Sir John Brydges.
- Hants:—Lord Audeley, Sir Wm. Sandes, Sir John Lyle, Wm. Pownd, John Pawlet, junr., Sir John Lye, Sir Geo. Putenham, Sir Wm. Gyfford, Rob. Walop, Arthur Plantagenet, Sir Maurice Barow.
- Hereford:—Lord Ferrers, Sir Ric. Cornewall.
- Hertford:—Lord Barnesse (Berners), Sir Edw. Benstede, Thos. Clyfford.
- Kent:—Lord Bargeveny, Lord Cobham, Lord Clynton, Sir Edw. Ponynges, Sir Wm. Scot, Sir John Pechie, Sir Edw. Guldeford, Sir Hen. Guyldeford, Thos. Cheynye, Sir Rauf Seyntleger, Sir John Darell, Raynold Pymp, Sir John Scott, Sir Wm. Crowner, Sir John Fogge, Sir John Norton.
- Leicester:—The Lord Marquis, Lord Hastyngs, Sir John Digby, Sir Edw. Feldyng, Sir Ric. Sacheverell, Lord John Gray, Lord Leonard Gray, Lord Richard Gray, Sir Wm. Skevyngton, Sir John Villers, _ Hasylrygge.
- Lincoln:—Lord Willoughby, Sir Christopher Willoughby, Sir John Husey, Sir Geoffrey Paynell, Sir Miles Bushe, Sir Rob. Scheffeld, Sir Wm. Tirwytt, Wm. Askew, Geo. Fitzwilliam, Sir Rob. Dymocke, Wm. Hansard.
- Middlesex:—The Lord of Saint John's, Sir Thos. Lovell.
- Norfolk:—Lord Edmund Howard, Sir Ph. Calthorp, Sir Robt. Clere, Sir John Haydon, Sir Thos. Wodehows, Sir Thos. Wyndham, Wm. Paston, Sir Robt. Lovell, John Shelton, Sir Thos. Benyngfeld, Nic. Appylyerd, Edw. Knyvet.
- Northampton:—Sir Nic. Vaux, Sir Wm. Parre, Sir Thos. Lucy, Thos. Empson.
- Nottingham:—Sir Wm. Parpoynt (Pierpoint), Sir Thos. Sutton, Sir Brian Stapleton, Robt. Clyfton, Humphrey Hersy, Rowland Dygby, John Beron, Sir Wm. Meryng, Sir Hen. Willoughby.
- Oxford:—Sir Adryan Fortesku, Sir Edw. Chamberlayn, Sir Wm. Rede, Walter Bulstrode, Sir John Daunce.
- Shropshire:—The Earl of Shrewsbury, Sir Ric. Laykyn, Sir Thos. Blount, Sir Thos. Leyghton, Sir Rob. Corbett, Sir Thos. Cornwall.
- Somerset:—The Earl of Wiltshire, Sir John Trevelian, Sir Nicholas Wadham, Sir John Rodney, Sir Ric. Ware, _ Strangwyshe, Lord Daubenye.
- Stafford:—Sir John Feryes, Sir Loys (Lewis) Bagot, Sir John Gifford, Sir John Asheton, John Egyrton, Sir John Braycot, Sir John Stanley, John Blount.
- Suffolk:—Sir Thos. Bolayn, Sir Rob. Brandon, Sir Rob. Drury, Sir Ant. Wyngfeld, Sir Wm. Walgrave, Sir Ric. Wentworth, Sir John Shelton, Sir Arthur Hopton, Sir Rob. Courson, Sir John Audley, Thos. Felton, _ Branzton, Sir Wm. Sidney.
- Surrey:—Sir Henry Wyatt, Sir Matthew Brown, Sir John Ywardby, Sir Edw. Bray.
- Sussex:—The Duke of Norfolk, the Earl of Surrey, Lord Matravers, Sir Thos. West, Lord Dacre, Sir David Owen, Sir Godard Oxynbridge, Wm. Ashbornham, Sir Edw. Lewkenor, Sir John Dawtry.
- Warwick:—Lord Dudley, Sir Gilbert Talbot, junr., Geo. Throgmorton, Sir Edward Belknap, Edw. Gryvill, Sir John Burdute, Sir Thos. Lucy, Sir Edw. Ferys, Edw. Conway.
- Westmoreland:—Sir Thos. Parre.
- Wilts:—Sir Edward Hungerford, Sir John Seymour, Sir Edw. Darell, Sir John Dakers, Sir John Newport, Sir Maurice Barow, Sir John Scrope, Sir Thos. Long
- Worcester:- Rhys ap Thomas, Gruffydd ap Rhys ap Thomas
- York:—The Earl of Northumberland, Lord Darcy, Lord Lumley, Sir John Constable, Sir Rob. Constable, Lord Conyers, Sir Geo. Fitzhew, Sir Rauf Ellerkar, Sir Wm. Gaskoyn, Sir Ric. Tempest, Sir Wm. Skargill, Sir Guy Wolstrope, Sir Rauf Evers, Sir Wm. Evers, Sir Wm. Bulmer, Sir John Bulmer, Sir Edw. Pekeryng.

All of the English Knights of the Garter, some 23 in all, were present.

== In popular culture ==
- George Payne Rainsford James, the British novelist, dramatised the meeting in his second novel, Darnley: or, The Field of the Cloth of Gold (1830).
- The Showtime series The Tudors dramatised the meeting in its first season (2007).
- The plot of Magnus Mills' 2015 novel, entitled The Field of the Cloth of Gold, echoes elements of the meeting.
- The hit open-air historical night show Kynren in Bishop Auckland, northern England, features a scene based on the Field of the Cloth of Gold.
- The Starz series The Spanish Princess includes a fictionalised version of the meeting in its second season (2020). Charles V of Spain is erroneously shown attending the summit at the invitation of his aunt, Catherine of Aragon, as she wants to convince Henry VIII to betrothe six-year-old Princess Mary to the twenty-year-old Charles rather than the two-year-old son of Francis I of France.
- In Marcel Proust's novel, Swann's Way, he references the "Field of the Cloth of Gold" during a scene when the narrator meets Gilberte: "She [Gilberte] was in fact summoning me to cross the snowy lawn to her camp, to 'take the field,' which the sun, by casting over it a rosy gleam, the metallic lustre of old and worn brocades, had turned into a Field of the Cloth of Gold." Remembrance of Things Past, vol. 1, Swann's Way, Marcel Proust, p. 433, First Vintage Books edition, 1982.
- The 1976 musical Rex, with music by Richard Rodgers and lyrics by Sheldon Harnick, tells the story of Henry VIII, and portrays the event in a song named "The Field of Cloth of Gold'".
- In the Netflix series Hostage, a replica of the Wrestling at the Field of the Cloth of Gold tapestry is gifted by the French president to the prime minister of UK.
