= Three to See the King =

2001 novel by Magnus Mills

- First edition
- Author: Magnus Mills
- Language: English
- Genre: Parable
- Publisher: Flamingo
- Publication date: 4 June 2001
- Publication place: United Kingdom
- Media type: Print & eBook
- Pages: 176
- ISBN: 978-0312283551

Three to See the King, the third novel by Booker Prize-shortlisted author Magnus Mills, published in 2001, is part parable and part speculative fiction. Written after the success of his first book, The Restraint of Beasts, brought him into the media limelight, Three to See the King started out in part as a "project" to prove to himself that he could be a full-time writer. The book was so successful that reviews appeared in The Guardian, The Spectator and The Independent, and it has been translated into both German as Zum König! (2004) and French as 3 pour voir le Roi (2005).

== Plot ==
The nameless narrator lives in an isolated tin house situated on a windswept sandy plain, miles from his nearest neighbours whom he meets infrequently. He is quite happy in his lonely self-sufficiency until unexpectedly a woman, Mary Petrie, comes to live with him. Unsettled at first, the narrator gradually gets used to the companionship. Then news comes of a new community being established on the edge of the plain by a charismatic, yet enigmatic figure who is digging a canyon and gaining more and more followers to his revolutionary cause. One by one, his neighbours join the canyon project, moving their tin houses to the new community as the narrator feels under increasing pressure to join them. It transpires that the end-goal for the project is not for there to be a city of tin houses, but a city of clay houses. Many of the previously convinced citizens of the plain and beyond are frustrated by this news, and decide to return to their previous existences.
