= McKitterick Prize =

Literary prize

- Description: Annual literary prize honoring a debut novel by an author over the age of 40
- Country: United Kingdom
- Presented by: Society of Authors

The McKitterick Prize is a United Kingdom literary prize. It is administered by the Society of Authors. It was endowed by Tom McKitterick, who had been an editor of The Political Quarterly but had also written a novel which was never published. The prize is awarded annually for a first novel (which need not have been published) by an author over 40. As of 2009, the value of the prize was £4000.

The McKitterick Prize was first awarded in 1990.

== List of prize winners ==
=== 1990s ===
Year	Author	Title
1990	Simon Mawer	Chimera
1991	John Loveday	Halo
1992	Alberto Manguel	News from a Foreign Country Came
1993	Andrew Barrow	The Tap Dancer
1994	Helen Dunmore	Zennor in Darkness
1995	Christopher Bigsby	Hester
1996	Stephen Blanchard	Gagarin and I
1997	Patricia Duncker	Hallucinating Foucault
1998	Eli Gottlieb	The Boy Who Went Away
1999	Magnus Mills	The Restraint of Beasts

=== 2000s ===
Year	Author	Title
2000	Chris Dolan	Ascension Day
2001	Giles Waterfield	The Long Afternoon
2002	Manil Suri	The Death of Vishnu
2003	Mary Lawson	Crow Lake
2004	Mark Haddon	The Curious Incident of the Dog in the Night-Time
2005	Lloyd Jones	Mr Vogel
2006	Peter Pouncey	Rules for Old Men Waiting
2007	Reina James	This Time of Dying
2008	Jennie Walker	24 for 3
2009	Chris Hannan	Missy

=== 2010s ===
2010s McKitterick Prize Winners and Runners-up
Year	Author	Work	Result
2010	Raphael Selbourne	Beauty	Won
2011	Emma Henderson	Grace Williams Says It Loud	Won
2011	Frances Kay	Micka	Runner-up
2012	Ginny Baily	Africa Junction	Won
2012	Cressida Connolly	My Former Heart	Runner-up
2013	Alison Moore	The Lighthouse	Won
2013	Caroline Brothers	Hinterland	Runner-up
2014	Gabriel Weston	Dirty Work	Won
2014	Gabriel Gbadamosi	Vauxhall	Runner-up
2015	Robert Allison	The Letter Bearer	Won
2015	Paul Ewen	Francis Pug: How to Be a Public Author	Runner-up
2016	Petina Gappah	The Book of Memory	Won
2016	Nick Coleman	Pillow Man	Runner-up
2017	David Dyer	The Midnight Watch	Won
2017	Austin Duffy	This Living & Immortal Thing	Runner-up
2018	Anietie Isong	Radio Sunrise	Won
2018	Frances Maynard	The Seven Rules of Elvira Carr	Runner-up
2019	Kelleigh Greenberg-Jephcott	Swan Song	Won
2019	Carys Davies	West	Runner-up

=== 2020s ===
2020s McKitterick Prize Winners and Runners-up
Year	Author	Work	Result
2020	Claire Adam	Golden Child	Won
2020	Taffy Brodesser-Akner	Fleishman Is in Trouble	Runner-up
2021	Elaine Feeney	As You Were	Won
2021	Deepa Anappara	Djinn Patrol on the Purple Line	Runner-up
2022	David Annand	Peterdown	Won
2022	Lisa Taddeo	Animal	Runner-up
2023	Louise Kennedy	Trespasses	Won
2023	Liz Hyder	The Gifts	Runner-up
2024	Wenyan Lu	The Funeral Cryer	Won
2024	Chidi Ebere	Now I Am Here	Runner-up
2025	Tom Newlands	Only Here, Only Now	Won
2025	Lauren Elkin	Scaffolding	Runner-up

== Sources ==
- "McKitterick Prize". Society of Authors.
