= Lloyd Jones (Welsh writer) =

Welsh novelist (1951–2026)

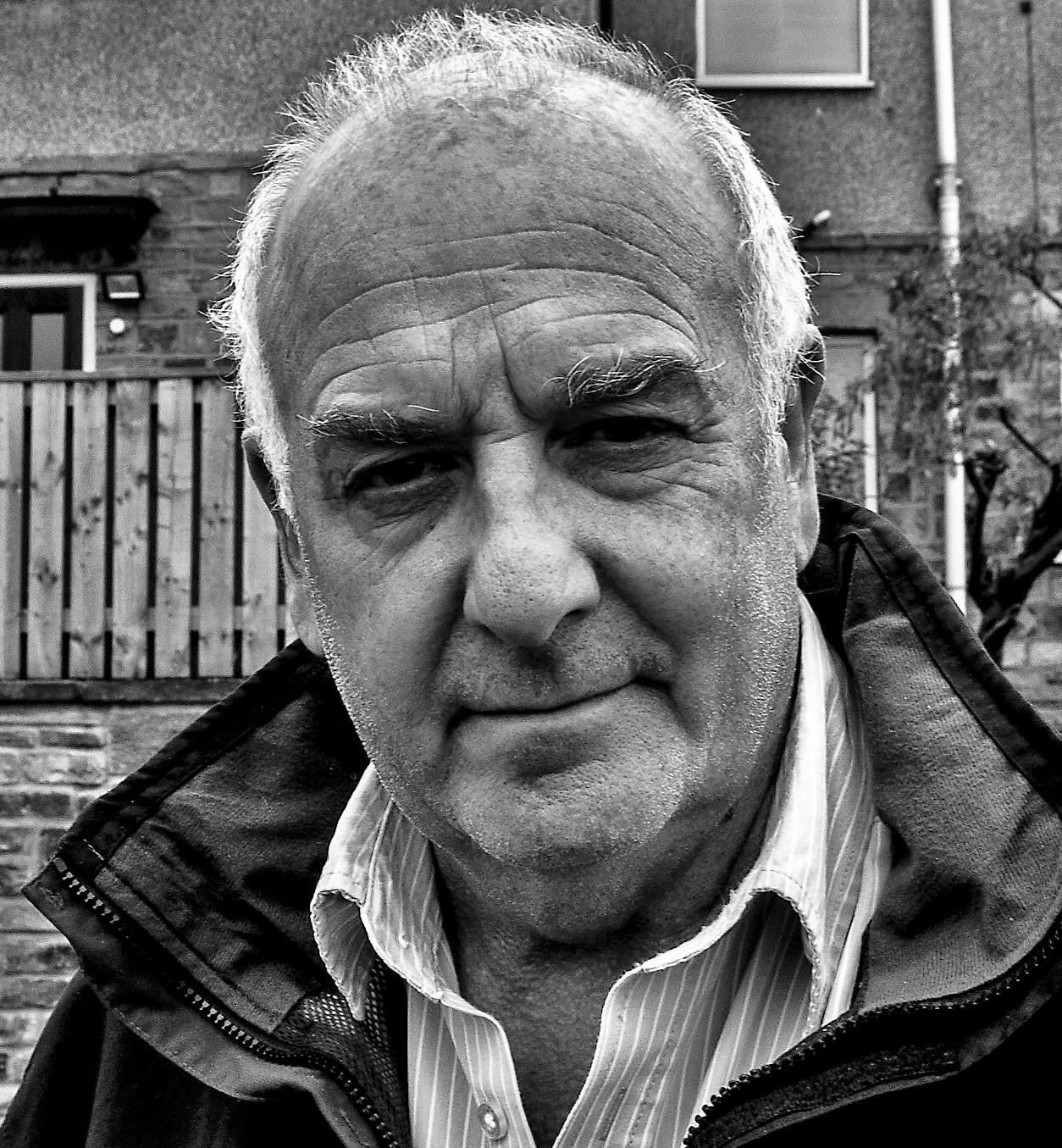
Lloyd Jones

Lloyd Jones (14 July 1951 – 10 March 2026) was a Welsh poet, novelist and photographer.

== Life and career ==
Born at Bryn Clochydd, Gwytherin, near Llanrwst, he lived at Abergwyngregyn and had formerly worked on a farm and as a newspaper editor, a lecturer and a mencap nurse. Jones was a graduate of Bangor University, with a degree in Welsh and English literature. He wrote in both Welsh and English. After almost dying from alcoholism, he gave up drinking on 28 December 2001. In 2002, he became the first person to walk completely around Wales, a journey of a thousand miles.

Jones died on 10 March 2026, at the age of 74.

== Publications ==
Jones published the following books:

- Mr Vogel (Seren, 2004), which was based partly on Jones' walk around Wales. It won the McKitterick Prize and was shortlisted for the Bollinger Everyman Wodehouse Prize for Comic Fiction.
- Mr Cassini (Seren, 2006), which was partially inspired by his walking across Wales in seven different directions. It won the Wales Book of the Year award in 2007.
- My First Colouring Book (Seren, 2008), a collection of short stories and essays.
- See How They Run (Seren, 2012), part of the Mabinogion series.
- Y Dŵr (Y Lolfa, 2009) a novel about climate change, set in Wales.
- Y Daith (Y Lolfa, 2014), a fantasy about a walking trip along Offa's Dyke.
- Water (Y Lolfa, 2014), a translation of Y Dwr.
- Fflur (Y Lolfa, 2019), a country romance.
- Lobsgows (Gwasg Bodfan, 2024) Irish, Scots and Breton Gaelic poetry translated into Welsh, also Inuit and Afghanistan poems, Mesopotamian letters, plus various articles and poems in Welsh.

He has self-published the following books of poetry:

- Secret Life of a Postman (2014)
- Out With It (2016)
- My life on Tlön (2017)
- Collected Poems (2019)
- Selected Poems (2019)

He has also self-published the following volumes of essays:

- Three Little Things Before I Go
- When I'm 64

In addition, he has published the following:

- Bron Haul – the croft on the moors (Gwasg Carreg Gwalch, bilingual edition, 2011), a festschrift by three authors telling the story of a small moorland croft.
- The Dream of the Mouse, a surreal comic novel.

He has also translated a highly successful Welsh novel, O! Tyn y Gorchudd, by Angharad Price:

- The Life of Rebecca Jones (MacLehose Press, 2014)

He has also contributed chapters to:

- Sing, Sorrow, Sorrow: Dark and Chilling Tales (Seren Books, 2010)
- Un yn Ormod, a book about people who've experienced problems with alcohol (Y Lolfa, 2020)

Photographic exhibitions:

- People and Places I Wouldn't Have Seen if I'd Carried on Drinking at the Museum of Modern Art, Machynlleth, from 18 January – 29 February 2020.
- Byw yn y Wlad/Country Life at the Syr Henry Jones Museum, Llangernyw, Summer 2021.
- Sobor o beth/Sober light of day at Storiel Museum and Art Gallery, Bangor, October –– December 2021.
