= The Field of the Cloth of Gold (novel) =

2015 book by Magnus Mills

- First edition
- Author: Magnus Mills
- Language: English
- Publisher: Bloomsbury
- Publication date: 23 April 2015
- Publication place: United Kingdom
- Media type: Print
- Pages: 224
- ISBN: 1-4088-6002-3

The Field of the Cloth of Gold is a novel by English author Magnus Mills, published in 2015 by Bloomsbury it was shortlisted for the Goldsmiths Prize that year.

== Plot introduction ==
The Great Field lies on a bend in the river, bounded on three sides by water and to the north by wilderness. It is populated by a growing number of tents, and its story is told by the unnamed narrator – one of the first to pitch camp. As the year advances from spring to summer, each new arrival adds complexity to the fledgling society, its unwritten rules and petty jealousies. A large regimented group sets up a tent village in the south of the field and digs a drainage ditch. This divides both the field and opinion, and the narrator is forced to take sides. Further groups arrive and threaten the delicate balance of power, then Hippo, clad in just a coarse blanket, brings a message that he proclaims all must hear.

The title of the novel is taken from the site of a 1520 meeting between Henry VIII and Francis I of France, and the plot echoes several episodes from British history including the Roman period (Julius Caesar's 55BC invasion, Claudius's 43AD takeover, the building of Hadrian's Wall and finally the collapse of the Roman Empire) and the Viking incursions.

== Inspiration ==
In an interview with BOMB magazine, Mills explained: "It started when I began considering the actual Field of the Cloth of Gold in France, which is where Henry VIII met Francis I. They both had a large pavilion of tents set up. If you go there now, not knowing its historical context, it just looks like a big field. So I wondered what would happen if someone happened upon history occurring in an inconspicuous place and not knowing what was going on."

== Reception ==
The Daily Telegraph's Toby Clements found the novel "charming", concluding, "So what is it all about? Is it a fable? A parable? An allegory? A bit of fun? All four? Part of the pleasure of reading Mills is trying to work out what he is getting at, if he is getting at anything at all. Alice Fishburn in the Financial Times was also enthused, saying that "utter originality continues to jump out at us until the very last page."

Other reviewers had reservations. Edward Docx in The Guardian wrote that "Mills’ diffident stylistic and aesthetic tendencies are working against the bold vitality of his free-thinking intellectual reach. In one way, The Field of the Cloth of Gold is a meditation on immigration and the contrast between conservative ideas of preservation and progressive ideas of integration. But this is at odds with Mills's fondness for anti-psychology and the minor amusements of deliberately mundane dialogue." He concludes, "You only have to think of, say, Golding’s Lord of the Flies or Coetzee’s Waiting for the Barbarians to realise what allegorical writing is capable of and how limited Mills is choosing to make things."
