= All Quiet on the Orient Express =

1999 novel by Magnus Mills

- First edition (UK)
- Author: Magnus Mills
- Language: English
- Genre: Tragicomedy
- Publisher: Flamingo (UK); Arcade (US)
- Publication date: 1999
- Publication place: United Kingdom
- Media type: Print & ebook
- Pages: 224
- ISBN: 0-00-225906-0

All Quiet on the Orient Express is the second novel by Booker Prize shortlisted author Magnus Mills, published in 1999. It was written over a 4 month period. As with his first novel it is a tragicomedy with an unnamed narrator dealing with apparently simple but increasingly sinister situations.

== Plot ==
The narrator is spending a few weeks camping in the Lake District before setting out on a motorcycle trip to India. He agrees to help the campsite owner, Tommy Parker, by performing a simple chore, painting a gate. One thing inexorably leads to another, and he finds himself drawn into a succession of disparate tasks, each more complex and time-consuming, and from which there appears to be no escape.

== Reception ==
Carey Harrison in the San Francisco Chronicle commented: "It's not out of idle amusement that the sweetly fiendish author has named his book All Quiet on the Orient Express. This marriage of famous titles hides from view (yet points to) its dark, telling twin: Murder on the Western Front. Not since Kafka has an author lured his audience so innocently, so beguilingly, into hell."

Nanja Labi in Time wrote: "In this creepy, deadpan novel by a nominee for Britain's Booker Prize, nothing much happens—except that one man slowly, painlessly, surrenders his life."

Brian Evenson compared it favourably with Mills's first novel: "The characters are similar, the style and tone are quite similar, and both make wry but dark commentary on the dilemma of working men. Yet one must acknowledge that the range of All Quiet on the Orient Express is larger; Mills develops the absurdity of this situation with more subtlety and precision."

== Film adaptation ==
According to The New York Times in 2012, the novel was being adapted into a film by Idiotlamp Productions, directed by Jim Field Smith. Idiotlamp's website no longer has any information about this project, as of 2017.
