= Nick Coleman (British writer) =

British writer (born 1960)

Nick Coleman (born 1960 in Buckinghamshire) is a British writer.

He grew up in Cambridgeshire and has lived in London since 1982. He is a former music editor of Time Out and an arts and music journalist for The Independent and The Independent on Sunday. In 2010 he wrote The Train in the Night: A Story of Music and Loss, about coming to terms with his own experience five years earlier of hearing loss., published in 2012. It was shortlisted for the Wellcome Book Prize 2012.

His other books are the novel, Pillow Man (2015), which was a runner-up for the McKitterick Prize, and Voices: How a Great Singer Can Change Your Life (2018), an exploration of what it means to listen to, and be compelled by, singing.
