= Screwtop Thompson =

- First edition
- Author: Magnus Mills
- Cover artist: Sarah Greene
- Language: English
- Publisher: Bloomsbury Publishing Plc
- Publication date: October 2010
- Publication place: United Kingdom
- Media type: Print & eBook
- Pages: 128
- ISBN: 1-4088-0997-4

Screwtop Thompson, Booker Prize-shortlisted author Magnus Mills' third collection of short stories, brings together ten short tales that "trundle gently between the ordinary, absurd and the outright surreal." Mills writes short stories described as "solid, crafted from deceptively simple sentences and concerning simple characters trying to achieve simple goals, which makes their sudden flights of fancy all the more unexpected."

== Contents ==
The first eight stories are taken from his earlier collections, Only When the Sun Shines Brightly and Once in a Blue Moon published in 1999 and 2003 respectively.

As in his novels, all the stories are told by an unnamed narrator :

- "Only When the Sun Shines Brightly", the narrator watches as a large plastic sheet is caught on a viaduct above a joiners workshop in strong wind.
- "At Your Service", in which he helps his diminutive Chinese friend cut branches from a tree obscuring the light entering his flat, but the tree is growing in a neighbours garden.
- "The Comforter", as an architect he meets an archdeacon on the way to an interminable cathedral meeting.
- "Hark the Herald", he spends his first night and day at a West Country guesthouse over Christmas but fails to meet the other residents.
- "Once in a Blue Moon", he acts as negotiator in an armed siege between the police and his mother.
- "The Good Cop" in which he is interrogated by one or possibly two identical policemen.
- "Screwtop Thompson" in which he is a child and receives as a present "Screwtop Thompson" a toy whose head unscrews and which came in several guises. The narrator chose a policeman but received a schoolmaster....without a head (see cover illustration).
- "They Drive by Night" in which he is picked up as a hitch-hiker by a large lorry in which he sits in the noisy cab between the driver and his mate and attempts to make sense of the conversation.
- "Half as Nice", Auntie Pat had enjoyed four hit singles in the 1960s with an all-girl vocal group, and had married their producer, Dwight...
- "Vacant Possession", employed to fit a cattle grid at a large, but empty country house, Noz and the narrator were staying there for three days while they completed the work; but the house feels 'creepy'...
- "A Public Performance", In Bristol in 1970 a sixth former buys a Russian great coat but it doesn't have the desired effect as he attends a Pink Floyd concert at Colston Hall.
