= Reader, I Married Him (Patricia Beer book) =

1974 book by Patricia Beer

Reader, I Married Him: A Study of the Women Characters of Jane Austen, Charlotte Brontë, Elizabeth Gaskell and George Eliot
- Author: Patricia Beer
- Language: English
- Subject: literary criticism
- Publisher: Macmillan Publishers
- Publication date: 1974
- Pages: 213
- ISBN: 0-333-15067-8

Reader, I Married Him: A Study of the Women Characters of Jane Austen, Charlotte Brontë, Elizabeth Gaskell and George Eliot is a 1974 literary criticism by Patricia Beer that examines Victorian literature authors, their characters, and their works. It was reviewed in several publications.
