= The Letter Bearer =

2014 novel by Robert Allison

First edition (publ. Granta Books)

The novel The Letter Bearer was critically acclaimed when it was published in 2014.

Author Robert Allison was nominated for, or won several prestigious awards, including the McKitterick Prize. The novel was shortlisted for the 2014 Desmond Elliott Prize.
