= Eli Gottlieb =

American author

- Born: New York City
- Education: Hampshire College (BA)
- Writing career
- Genre: Novels
- Website: www.eligottlieb.com

Eli Gottlieb is an American author. His first novel, The Boy Who Went Away, was published by St. Martin's Press, in 1997. The novel debuted to widespread critical acclaim and earned Gottlieb the Rome Prize and the McKitterick Prize from the British Society of Authors in 1998.

== Education and background ==
Gottlieb was born in New York City and raised in Cedar Grove, New Jersey. He graduated from Hampshire College.

== Career ==
Gottlieb has taught American literature at the University of Padua Italy, written documentary films and worked as a senior editor at Elle magazine and as a staff writer for The Jewish Theological Seminary of America.

In 2008, Gottlieb's second novel, Now You See Him, was published by William Morrow. Translated into eleven languages, the novel was named "Book of the Year" by The Independent (UK) and Bookmarks magazine.

His third novel, The Face Thief, was published by Morrow on January 17, 2012.

His fourth novel, Best Boy, was published by Liveright on August 24, 2015.
