= Edward Foxe =

16th-century English bishop

The Right Reverend Edward Foxe
- Bishop of Hereford
- Church: Church of England
- Diocese: Diocese of Hereford
- In office: 1535–1538
- Predecessor: Charles Booth
- Successor: Edmund Bonner
- Other posts: Archdeacon of Leicester, Archdeacon of Dorset, Dean of Salisbury

Personal details
- Born: 1496 Dursley Gloucestershire
- Died: 8 May 1538 (age 41–42)
- Buried: St Mary Mounthaw London
- Education: Eton College
- Alma mater: King's College Cambridge

Edward Foxe (c. 1496 – 8 May 1538) was an English churchman, Bishop of Hereford. He played a major role in Henry VIII's divorce from Catherine of Aragon, and he assisted in drafting the Ten Articles of 1536.

== Early life ==
He was born at Dursley in Gloucestershire, and may have been related to Richard Fox, Bishop of Exeter and Lord Privy Seal under King Henry VII. Foxe was educated at Eton College and at King's College, Cambridge. After graduating in 1520, he was made secretary to Cardinal Wolsey in 1527. In 1528 he was sent with Bishop Stephen Gardiner to Rome to obtain from Pope Clement VII a decretal commission for the trial and decision of the case between King Henry VIII and his first wife, Catherine of Aragon.

== Academic career ==
Foxe served as Provost of King's College from 22 September 1528 until 8 May 1538, and in August 1529 was the means of conveying to the king Thomas Cranmer's historic advice that he should apply to the universities of Europe rather than to the pope. After a brief mission to Paris in October 1529, Foxe in January 1530 befriended Hugh Latimer at Cambridge and took an active part in persuading the English universities to decide in the king's favour. He was sent to employ similar methods of persuasion at the French universities in 1530–1531, and was also engaged in negotiating a closer league between England and France.

== Clerical career ==
Foxe served as the king's almoner c. 1532 – 1537, and as prolocutor of convocation in April 1533 when it decided against the validity of Henry's marriage with Catherine. In 1534 he published his treatise De vera differentia regiae potestatis et ecclesiae, defending the Royal Supremacy by use of the documents collated in the Collectanea satis copiosa. Various ecclesiastical preferments were now granted him, including the archdeaconry of Leicester (1531–1535), the archdeaconry of Dorset (1533–1535), the deanery of Salisbury (1533) and the bishopric of Hereford (1535). He was nominated to the See of Hereford on 20 August 1535, elected by the college of Hereford on 25 August, confirmed on 15 September, and ordained a bishop on 26 September 1535; he received the temporalities on 7 September and the spiritualities on 14 October 1535.

In 1535–36 he was sent to Germany to discuss the basis of a political and theological understanding with the Lutheran princes and divines, and had several interviews with Martin Luther, who could not be persuaded of the justice of Henry VIII's divorce. Henry was unwilling to endorse the Augsburg Confession and, in 1536, the Wittenberg articles were drafted by Foxe and Lutheran clergymen as a compromise. The articles met strong opposition within convocation in June of the same year, leading Henry to personally intervene to bring about an agreement. This led to the drafting and passing of the Ten Articles by convocation. In 1536, Martin Bucer dedicated his Commentaries on the Gospels to Foxe.

== Death and legacy ==
Foxe died on 8 May 1538 and was buried in the church of St Mary Mounthaw, London. Foxe is credited with the authorship of several proverbial sayings, such as "the surest way to peace is a constant preparedness for war" and "time and I will challenge any two in the world." However, the former is a paraphrase of si vis pacem, para bellum, while the latter is more usually ascribed to Philip II of Spain.

Academic offices
Preceded by Robert Hacomblen	Provost of King's College, Cambridge; 1528–1538	Succeeded by George Day
Church of England titles
Preceded by Charles Booth	Bishop of Hereford; 1535–1538	Succeeded by Edmund Bonner
