= Collectanea satis copiosa =

1530–1531 Collection of texts

The Collectanea satis copiosa (Latin: ‘The Sufficiently Abundant Collections’) was a collection of scriptural, historical, and patristic texts that was compiled to provide royal propagandists with arguments justifying Henry VIII's personal and England's provincial independence from Rome. Likely compiled around 1530-1531 by a group of men including Thomas Cranmer and Edward Foxe, the Collectanea supplied the ideology behind the Royal Supremacy. As evidence that Kings of England historically had no superior on Earth—including the Pope—the Collectanea cited scripture, conciliar decrees, Anglo-Saxon laws, and numerous historical works, including texts by Bede, Matthew Paris, William of Malmesbury, and Geoffrey of Monmouth. Henry VIII's numerous annotations in the surviving manuscript show his direct engagement with the text and the arguments contained therein.

By asserting England's imperial status, the Collectanea served a twofold purpose in asserting England's imperial status. First, it enabled Henry VIII to have his marriage to Catherine of Aragon annulled without first obtaining the Pope's permission. More importantly, it allowed for Henry VIII's break with Rome.

In the preamble to the Act in Restraint of Appeals, the claims of the Collectanea were forcibly echoed:

Where by divers sundry old authentic histories and chronicles it is manifestly declared and expressed that this realm of England is an empire, and so hath been accepted in the world, governed by one supreme head and king having the dignity and royal estate of the imperial crown of the same, unto whom a body politic, compact of all sorts and degrees of people divided in terms and by names of spiritualty and temporalty, be bounded and owe to bear next to God a natural and humble obedience; he being also institute and furnished by the goodness and sufferance of Almighty God with plenary, whole and entire power, preeminence, authority, prerogative and jurisdiction to render and yield justice and final determination to all manner of folk resiants or subjects within this realm, in all causes, matters, debates and contentions happening to occur, insurge or begin within the limits thereof, without restraint or provocation to any foreign princes or potentates of the world.
