= Patricia Beer =

British writer (1919–1999)

- Patricia Beer; Drypoint by George Adamson RE
- Born: 4 November 1919; Exmouth, Devon, England
- Died: 15 August 1999 (aged 79); Upottery, Devon, England
- Education: University of Exeter; University of Oxford
- Occupations: Poet and critic
- Spouse(s): P. N. Furbank (m. 1960); Damien Parsons (m. 1964)
- Relatives: Patricia Duncker (niece)

Patricia Beer (4 November 1919 – 15 August 1999) was an English poet and critic. Born to a family of Plymouth Brethren, a strict religious order, she took inspiration for her poetry from there, with particular influence from her mother who instilled the religion into her from a young age. Exposure to death during childhood also influenced her work. She earned a Bachelor of Letters degree at the University of Oxford, following which she taught in Italy for seven years. Returning to England, she began to publish poetry in 1959, and wrote full-time after 1968. Near her death, she was a candidate to replace Ted Hughes as Poet Laureate of the United Kingdom. Beer died in Upottery in Devon on 15 August 1999.

Beer's poetry style began as neo-romanticism, but she departed from it as her career progressed. The Oxford Companion to English Literature cites the background and legends of West Country as an influence in her poetry. Harry Blamires compared her work to W. B. Yeats for the way it "sucks the reader into the heart of compulsive inner argument and self-scrutiny", while Michael Schmidt, founder of P. N. Review, compared her to Stanley Spencer in her lucidity and canny innocence. Her 1974 Reader, I Married Him, in which she found Jane Austen's women characters to be wanting due to their chasing marriage, represented feminism's early impact on academic criticism.

== Biography ==
Patricia Beer was born on 4 November 1919 in Exmouth, Devon, into a family of Plymouth Brethren, a strict religious sect. Hymns were the first poetry Beer wrote. Her mother worked as a schoolteacher, while her father worked as a railway clerk. Her parents raised her in Withycombe Raleigh, a village near Exmouth. Beer was strongly influenced by the Plymouth Brethren Church, especially its "inward-looking Christianity" and her mother's instilling to her the religion. Death also influenced her work, with two of her grandparents working with coffins and tombstones; as an eight-year-old, Beer stated she had an abnormal fear of death, and saw poetry and the fame it could bring as a means to cope with eternity. She wanted to be a poet from that age.

Various sources describe her mother as dominant or the dominant parent. Beer wrote of her childhood in Mrs Beer's House, a memoir published in 1968. Her mother wanted her to be a schoolteacher. Patricia went to Exmouth Grammar School after earning a scholarship, where she continued after her mother's death in 1935. She studied English at Exeter University. Beer moved away from her religious background as a young adult, becoming a teacher and academic. She took her Bachelor of Letters degree at the University of Oxford, following which she spent seven years in Italy, from 1946 until 1953, where she taught English literature at the University of Padua, the British Institute and the Ministero Aeronautica in Rome. On this time in her life, Beer stated she was "enjoying [herself] in a way [she] wasn't allowed to when [she] was a child".

She started her career as a writer in the 1950s. In 1953, Beer returned to England, where she became Senior Lecturer in English at Goldsmiths' College at the University of London (1962–1968). She wrote Reader, I Married Him, which was published in 1974, on Victorian women writers, a work from her time at Goldsmiths. From 1968 onwards, she wrote full-time. She edited several anthologies, broadcast, and contributed to literary reviews, including for The Times Literary Supplement and the London Review of Books.

Beer was married twice; first in 1960 to the writer P. N. Furbank, and then in 1964 to John Damien Parsons, an architect, settling in Upottery, near Honiton. Near her death, she was a candidate to replace Ted Hughes as Poet Laureate of the United Kingdom. Beer died on 15 August 1999 in Upottery of a stroke. A compilation of her lengthier reviews under the title As I was Saying was published after her death in 2002.

Her niece is novelist and academic Patricia Duncker.

== Style, analysis and themes ==
When she began to write in the 1950s, her style fell into neo-romanticism of Britain post-World War II, though her style departed from neo-romanticism as she developed. Contemporary critics influenced Beer, with her stating she could not do her best poetry while thinking about them. As she progressed, her writing shifted from the use of personae and similes to incorporating metaphor. Beer integrated literary figures native to England into works frequently. Gerard Manley Hopkins is cited as an influence for Beer to depart from strict metre later in her career. According to The Oxford Companion to English Literature (2009), the folklore and background of the West Country created the basis for many of Beer's poems. Similarly, the bucolic and rural nature of her home in Upottery is thought to have influenced her work.

Death is a theme throughout her poetry, especially in Autumn (1997), her last book of poetry. The Guardian described it "more droll than sad" and called her style overall wry melancholy. A writer for the Poetry Archive cited themes of good versus evil and religious beliefs, and said Beer imparts to them a sense of wryness. The Independent said she had a dark humor. On writing poetry, Beer stated there should be a connection between a poet's speaking voice and their writing voice, particularly important when the poet has a regional accent. In her book, Reader, she found Jane Austen's women characters to be wanting due to their chasing marriage. This represented feminism's early impact on academic criticism.

Harry Blamires compared her work to W. B. Yeats for the way it "sucks the reader into the heart of compulsive inner argument and self-scrutiny", while Michael Schmidt, founder of P. N. Review, compared her to Stanley Spencer in her lucidity and canny innocence. Schmidt said Beer separates herself from Victorian writers through irony, and says she takes religion without belief, but seriously nonetheless. He cites her prosaic poems as her real problem. Göran Nieragden states that Beer's "I" stages an ego and forms an identity that is non-permanent and context bound and that "'[f]uzzy' boundaries often mark the interface of the me and the you, of self and other". On the latter, Nieragden cites an example where Beer's female victim of an assassin becomes a love target for the assassin himself.

== Selected works ==
All works cited to the following sources:

- The Loss of the Magyar (1959)
- The Survivors (1963) (poems)
- Just Like the Resurrection (1967) (poems)
- Mrs. Beer's House (1968) (autobiography)
- The Estuary (1971) (poems)
- Reader: I Married Him (1974) (criticism)
- Driving West (1975)
- Moon's Ottery (1978) (historical novel)
- Poems (1979)
- The Lie of the Land (1983)
- Collected Poems (1988) (poems)
- Friend of Heraclitus (1993)
- Autumn (1997) (poems)
- As I was Saying (2002) (collection of reviews)
