= Patricia Duncker =

British novelist and academic

Patricia Duncker FRSL
- Born: 29 June 1951 (age 75); Kingston, Jamaica
- Education: Newnham College, Cambridge; St Hugh's College, Oxford
- Occupations: Novelist and academic
- Relatives: Patricia Beer (aunt)

Patricia Marjory Duncker (born 29 June 1951) is a British novelist and academic.

== Academic career ==
Duncker was born in Kingston, Jamaica, and was named after her aunt Patricia Beer. Duncker attended Bedales School in England and, after a period spent working in Germany, read English at Newnham College, Cambridge. She earned a doctorate from St Hugh's College, Oxford.

She has taught at the University of Wales, Aberystwyth (1991–2002), and was Professor of Prose Fiction at the University of East Anglia, working with Andrew Cowan and Michèle Roberts. From 2007 to 2015, Duncker was Professor of Contemporary Literature at the University of Manchester.

Duncker was elected a Fellow of the Royal Society of Literature (FRSL) in 2026.

== Bibliography ==
=== Fiction ===
- Hallucinating Foucault (novel, 1996) (McKitterick Prize, 1997)
- James Miranda Barry (novel, 1999), published in the United States as "The Doctor"
- The Deadly Space Between (novel, 2002)
- Miss Webster and Chérif (novel, 2006)
- The Strange Case of the Composer and His Judge (novel, 2009)
- Sophie and the Sibyl : a Victorian romance (novel, 2015)

Short stories:

- Monsieur Shoushana's Lemon Trees (short stories, 1997)
- Seven Tales of Sex and Death (short stories, 2003)

=== Non-fiction / academic (selection) ===
- Writing on the Wall: Selected Essays (2002)
- "The Suggestive Spectacle: Queer Passions in Brontë's Villette and The Prime of Miss Jean Brodie", Theorising Muriel Spark: Gender, Race Deconstruction, Psychoanalysis, ed. Martin McQuillan (2002) 67–77.
- Duncker, Patricia (Summer 2004). "Mary Shelley's afterlives: Biography and invention". Women: A Cultural Review. 15 (2): 230–249. doi:10.1080/0957404042000234079. S2CID 191507031.
- "Katherine Mansfield: The Writer of the Submerged World", Interrupted Lives in Literature, ed. Andrew Motion (2004), 53–65.
- Introduction to the new Penguin edition and new translation by Helen Constantine of Théophile Gautier's Mademoiselle de Maupin (2005)
- "A Writer's Writer". New Welsh Review. 74. Department of English & Creative Writing Aberystwyth University: 93–95. Winter 2006. (Patricia Duncker on George Eliot)
- Duncker, Patricia (1995). ""Bonne excitation, Orgasme Assuré": The representation of lesbianism in contemporary French pornography". Journal of Gender Studies. 4 (1): 5–15. doi:10.1080/09589236.1995.9960588.
