= Giles Waterfield =

British novelist (1949–2016)

Giles Adrian Waterfield
- Born: 24 July 1949
- Died: 5 November 2016 (aged 67)
- Education: Magdalen College, Courtauld Institute of Art
- Occupations: Novelist; art historian; curator
- Writing career
- Genre: Fiction

Giles Waterfield (24 July 1949 – 5 November 2016) was a British, McKitterick Prize—winning novelist, art historian and curator.

== Personal life and education ==
Giles Waterfield spent his childhood in Paris and Geneva, and was educated at Magdalen College, Oxford and the Courtauld Institute of Art.

== Career ==
In 1971 Giles Waterfield began his one-year work as an assistant teacher at the Merz-Schule, Stuttgart. From 1976 until 1979 he worked as Education Services Officer at the Royal Pavilion, Brighton. In 1979 he became the (first) Director of the Dulwich Picture Gallery, where he remained until 1996. After that he was an independent curator, writer and university lecturer.

His consultancies included Britten-Pears Foundation, South Bank Centre, Royal Academy of Arts, Sotheby’s London, Department for Culture, Media and Sport, National Trust for England and Wales, Commission for Architecture and the Built Environment, Ince Blundell (for English Heritage). In 1996–2000 he was an expert adviser to Museums, Libraries and Archives Expert Panel of the Heritage Lottery Fund where he assessed and monitored around 100 applications for capital projects. As a special adviser on arts and heritage to Esmée Fairbairn Foundation (2002–2007) he initiated a Regional Museums Initiative to fund exhibitions in regional museums. He was also a trustee of National Heritage Memorial Fund/Heritage Lottery Fund (2000–2006) and member of various committees: South East Regional Committee, National Trust (1982–1988); National Heritage Executive Committee and Judge, Museum of the Year Awards (1998–2003); Executive Committee, The London Library (1998–2001); Vice-President, National Association of Decorative and Fine Art Societies (1998–2006); trustee, Holburne Museum, Bath (1999–2003); trustee, Edward James Foundation, West Dean, West Sussex (1999–2003); Advisory Committee, Paul Mellon Centre for Studies in British Art (2002–2007); Arts Panel, National Trust for England and Wales (2004–2015); Expert Advisory Panel, National Heritage Memorial Fund (2006–2013); trustee 2005–2013, Charleston Trust Chair (2007–2010). From 1994 Giles Waterfield was deeply involved in the activity of The Attingham Trust, first as a Joint Director of the Attingham Summer School (1994 - 2003) and from 1995 as Director of Royal Collection Studies. He was Chair, Old Houses New Visions (2010–2016); Trustee, Garden Museum, London (2010–2016); Trustee, Emery Walker Foundation (2013– ) and Member, Acceptance in Lieu Panel, Arts Council England.

He was an Associate Lecturer at The Courtauld Institute of Art and also taught at the University of Notre Dame (London center) and Arcadia University (in London).

Waterfield curated numerous exhibitions, notably Soane and After (Dulwich Picture Gallery, 1987) Palaces of Art (Dulwich Picture Gallery and National Gallery of Scotland, 1991), Art Treasures of England Royal Academy of Arts, London (1998), In Celebration: the Art of the Country House (Tate, London, 1998-9), Below Stairs (National Portrait Gallery, London and National Portrait Gallery, Edinburgh, 2003-4), The Artist’s Studio (Compton Verney and Sainsbury Centre, UEA, 2009–10).

== Works ==
- The Long Afternoon (2000)
- The Hound In the Left Hand Corner (2002)
- Markham Thorpe (2006)
- The Iron Necklace (2015)

== Art publications ==
- Soane and After: The Architecture of Dulwich Picture Gallery (1987)
- Rich Summer of Art: A Regency Collection seen through Victorian Eyes (1988)
- Palaces of Art: Art Galleries in Britain 1790–1990 (1991)
- The Gallery Catalogue in Nineteenth Century Britain in New Research in Museum Studies, 1994 volume (1994)
- Art for the People, editor and contributor (1994)
- Art Treasures of England, joint editor and contributor (1998)
- A Victorian Salon: Paintings from the Russell-Cotes Art Gallery and Museum, contributor (1998)
- Below Stairs: The Servant’s Portrait, joint editor and contributor (2004)
- Opening Doors: Learning and the Historic Environment, a report for the Attingham Trust, editor and principal contributor (2004)
- Realms of Memory: changing perceptions of the country house in (ed.) Michael Forsyth, Understanding historic building conservation (2007)
- The Artist’s Studio exhibition catalogue, editor (2009)
- The People's Galleries: Art Museums and Exhibitions in Victorian Britain, to be published by Yale University Press (2015)
