= A Cruel Bird Came to the Nest and Looked In =

2011 novel by Magnus Mills

- First edition
- Author: Magnus Mills
- Cover artist: Anna Wray
- Language: English
- Publisher: Bloomsbury
- Publication date: 2011
- Publication place: United Kingdom
- Media type: Print
- Pages: 276
- ISBN: 978-1-4088-2120-6

A Cruel Bird Came to the Nest and Looked In is a novel by English author Magnus Mills published in 2011 by Bloomsbury.

== Plot introduction ==
The Cabinet of Greater Fallowfields comprises :

- Unnamed narrator - Principal Composer to the Imperial Court
- Smew - Librarian-in-Chief
- Brambling - Chancellor of the Exchequer
- Garganey - Postmaster General
- Whimbrel - Astronomer Royal
- Sanderling - Comptroller for the Admiralty
- Dotterel - Surveyor of the Imperial Works
- Wryneck - Pellitory-of-the-Wall

in which all is named after birds for no apparent reason.

They attempt to run the affairs of state but the absence of "his exalted highness, the majestic emperor of the realms, dominions, colonies and commonwealth of Greater Fallowfields" makes any actual decision-making impossible. They are also hindered by their lack of qualification for the positions they hold, and by the lack of resources available to them, for example Whimbrel has only a coin-operated telescope and Sanderling's navy all sailed away in the distant past. While they wait for the new Emperor to return from his education, Whimbrel notices through his telescope, activity approaching from the East - a railway line is being built from the far off 'City of Scoffers'. Its arrival brings many challenges to the fledgling administration and threatens the sovereignty of Greater Fallowfields itself...

== Reception ==
- Ian Sansom in The Guardian praises the novel as being "odd, endearing and disturbing", comparing it to the work of Mervyn Peake
- Adrian Turpin on FT.com writes "Some people are conspiracy theorists; Magnus Mills is a cock-up theorist. Like his previous six novels, this po-faced comedy is a tribute to mankind’s (and, yes, all the characters are men) ability to create chaos from order while deluding itself that it’s doing the reverse. Better this though – so A Cruel Bird suggests – than the sinisterly efficient forces of progress that threaten to transform the realm. One of our finest comic stylists in top form".
- Nicholas Royle in The Independent whilst praising the novel is also frustrated, "It's a quick and easy read, certainly enjoyable, charming, likeable and amusing, but with only occasional hints of a more interesting darkness that is never allowed to dominate. Tensions between different levels of society are not explored, just as the nightmarish potential of a life of exile in the industrialised City of Scoffers is never really exploited."
