= John Lumley, 4th Baron Lumley =

English knight

John Lumley, 4th Lord Lumley (1493–1544) was an English nobleman and soldier.

He was born the elder son of Richard Lumley, 3rd Lord Lumley and his wife Anne Conyers, and succeeded his father in 1510.

He fought at the Battle of Flodden in 1513 under the Earl of Surrey and was afterwards knighted. He was summoned to the House of Lords in 1514 and held the office of Justice of the Peace (J.P.) for County Durham in 1516. He accompanied Henry VIII with other knights to Henry's meeting with Francis I of France at the Field of the Cloth of Gold in France.

In 1536 he took part in the insurrection known as the Pilgrimage of Grace, but was pardoned by the Duke of Norfolk, who had been sent by the King to deal with the rebels. After that he retired to his estate and took no further part in the uprising.

He died in 1544 and was buried at Guisborough Priory. He had married Joan Scrope, daughter of Henry Scrope, 7th Baron Scrope of Bolton with whom he had 2 sons, including George, his heir apparent. George, however, was attainted and subsequently executed in his father's lifetime on 2 June 1537 for his own more active role in the Pilgrimage of Grace, whereby the family barony was forfeited. It was later restored in 1547 as a new barony for George's son John Lumley, 1st Baron Lumley, who had already succeeded to the family estates.
