= The Scheme for Full Employment =

2003 novel by Magnus Mills

- First edition
- Author: Magnus Mills
- Language: English
- Publisher: Flamingo
- Publication date: 3 Mar 2003
- Publication place: United Kingdom
- Media type: Print & eBook
- Pages: 272
- ISBN: 0-00-715131-4

The Scheme for Full Employment is a novel by the English author Magnus Mills, published in 2003 by Flamingo.

== Plot introduction ==
The scheme referred to in the title involves the driving of "UniVans" from depot to depot picking up and unloading cargo - the cargo being replacement parts for UniVans. "Gloriously self-perpetuating, the scheme was designed to give an honest day’s wage for an honest day’s labour", "the envy of the world: the greatest undertaking ever conceived by man". The novel is a satire of labour relations and describes how the scheme is brought to the brink of disaster.

== Reception ==
According to aggregated reviews at Complete Review, the novel received mixed reviews with no consensus; the website concluded it was a "decent trifle".
