= The Boy Who Went Away =

Book by Eli Gottlieb

- First edition
- Author: Eli Gottlieb
- Language: English
- Publisher: St Martins Press
- Publication date: 1997
- Publication place: United States
- Media type: Print
- Pages: 208
- Awards: Rome Prize; McKitterick Prize
- ISBN: 0-312-15070-9

The Boy Who Went Away is a 1997 debut novel by Eli Gottlieb, it won the Rome Prize, the McKitterick Prize in 1998, was a New York Times Notable Book of the Year. It has been identified as one of the best novels of the 1990s.

== Plot introduction ==
Set in 1967 in Essex County, New Jersey, the story is a first person narrative by adolescent Denny Graubert about his dysfunctional family and autistic older teenage brother Fad. His mother Harta struggles against the authorities, using all means possible to keep Fad out of an institution, while his father Max retreats into alcohol. Denny spies on his family and gains evidence of both his fathers alcoholism and his mother's affair with one of Fad's doctors...

== Reception ==
- Kirkus Reviews begins "A first novel about dysfunctional family life and coming of age in suburbia that relies on careful writing and a sly wit to distinguish itself from other narratives in this most contemporary of genres" and concludes "Gottlieb allows his story to find its proper length--which is short--and builds to the right emotional crescendo. A fine little book".
- Publishers Weekly enthuses "Gottlieb records the utterly confounding and inevitable plunge into adulthood with bold clarity. He depicts the spoken and unspoken language of cruelty and love in a family with confidence and poetry. But he is at his very best in the freshness of his imagery, creating a world so vivid and memorable the reader finds all five senses delightfully engaged in experiencing it."
- The Washington Post Book World's conclusion is mixed: "there is much here that is authentic and deeply felt...filled with the confusion and pain of a boy's coming of age alone among the strangers who had formerly been his family. But when the pivotal moment arrives, the novelist abruptly ceases writing, leaving his book dangling, unresolved, unfinished. Unfortunately, this is a novel that ends one chapter shy of being a great story.".
