= The Forensic Records Society =

2017 novel by Magnus Mills

- Square first edition cover, a 'pastiche of the sort of vintage 1960s 7-inch single sleeve collectors covet at record fairs'
- Author: Magnus Mills
- Cover artist: David Mann
- Language: English
- Publisher: Bloomsbury
- Publication date: 6 April 2017
- Publication place: United Kingdom
- Media type: Print
- ISBN: 1-4088-7837-2

The Forensic Records Society is a novel by English author Magnus Mills published in 2017 by Bloomsbury.

== Plot introduction ==
Meeting every Monday night in the back room of The Half Moon public house the 'Forensic Records Society' is established "for the express purpose of listening to records closely and in detail, forensically if you like, without any interruptions or distractions". moreover there should be "no comments or judgements of other peoples tastes". These rules are strictly enforced which leads to friction within the fledgling society and the forming of an alternative "Confessional Records Society" meeting on Tuesdays with the contrasting invitation to "Bring a record of your choice and confess!". Tensions increase between the rival societies, leading to 'bickering, desertion, subterfuge and rivalry'.

== Reception ==
- Kevin Gildea writing in The Irish Times compares it with Mills debut novel, "In this new book, Mills once again maintains a sustained tone that drives the comedy of his book. However, although the tone is related to The Restraint of Beasts, its resultant perspective is not as distant or cold, with the result that it is not as funny. But what it loses in humour it gains in a warmth, in a genuine evincing of the quiet joys of the characters’ concerns...There is a sweet tenderness at the heart of the book... The Forensic Records Society is a funny book, but it could have been a lot funnier. The story runs out of some steam towards the end, but the tenderness holds."
- Toby Litt in The Guardian concluded that the novel was "a story that could be read as a disguised retelling of the Russian revolution, or the Reformation, or the Sunni-Shia schism, or any great human falling out. As soon as you form any kind of “us”, Mills suggests, a “them” will form in response. In this, The Forensic Records Society is like Animal Farm but with blokes for pigs, and much better songs."

== Playlist ==
As mentioned in the review in The Herald, 'the device of naming only the titles and never the artists of all the records cited makes a pop quiz of the book's pages that even those whose obsessiveness is being ridiculed are bound to enjoy'. Often the titles 'humorously comment on or undermine the adjacent story'.
