= Balinghem =

- Commune
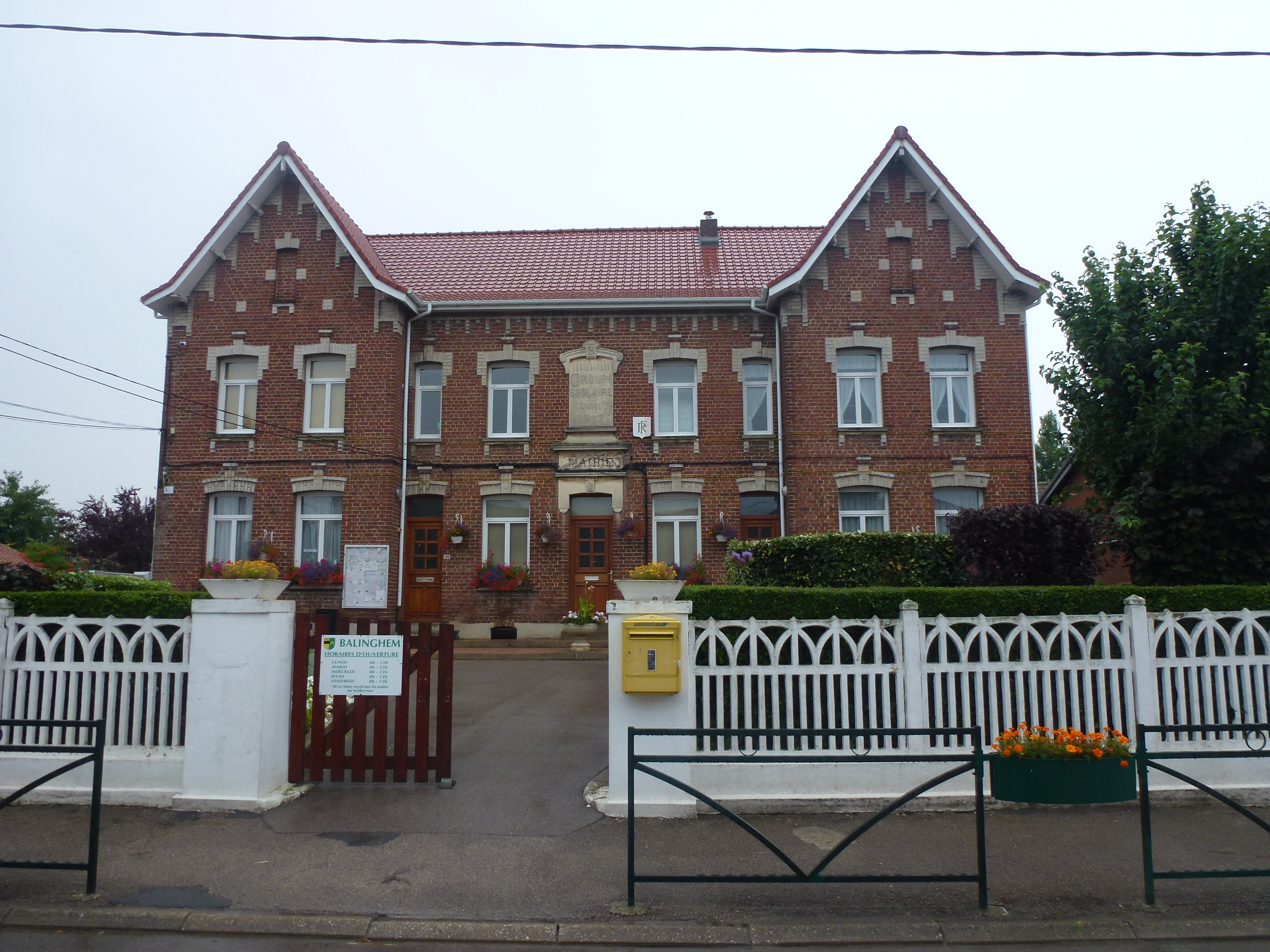
- The town hall and school of Balinghem

- Coat of arms
- Location of Balinghem
- Location within France Location within Hauts-de-France
- Coordinates: 50°51′43″N 1°56′33″E
- Country: France
- Region: Hauts-de-France
- Department: Pas-de-Calais
- Arrondissement: Calais
- Canton: Calais-2
- Intercommunality: CC Pays d'Opale

Government
  - Mayor (2020–2026): Jean-Claude Vandenbergue
- Area^{1}: 5.79 km^{2} (2.24 sq mi)
- Elevation: 8 m (26 ft)
- Highest elevation: 37 m (121 ft)
- Lowest elevation: 2 m (6.6 ft)
- Population (2023): 1,220
  - Density: 211/km^{2} (546/sq mi)
- Time zone: UTC+01:00 (CET)
  - Summer (DST): UTC+02:00 (CEST)
- INSEE/Postal code: 62078 /62610
- ^{1} French Land Register data, which excludes lakes, ponds, glaciers > 1 km^{2} (0.386 sq mi or 247 acres) and river estuaries.

Balinghem (French pronunciation: [balɛ̃ɡɑ̃]) is a commune in the Pas-de-Calais department in the Hauts-de-France region in northern France.

== Geography ==
A village located 10 miles (16 km) southeast of Calais, on the D228 road.

== Population ==
Historical population
Year	Pop.	±% p.a.
1968	525	—
1975	539	+0.38%
1982	530	−0.24%
1990	763	+4.66%
1999	829	+0.93%
2007	1,024	+2.68%
2012	1,169	+2.68%
2017	1,169	+0.00%
2023	1,220	+0.71%
Source: INSEE

== Sights ==
- The sixteenth-century church of the Nativité-de-Notre-Dame.
- A monument to the meeting of Henry VIII and Francis I of France at the Field of the Cloth of Gold in 1520.

== Transport ==
The Chemin de fer d'Anvin à Calais opened a railway station at Guînes in 1881. The railway was closed in 1955.

== See also ==
- Communes of the Pas-de-Calais department
