= The Maintenance of Headway =

2009 novel by Magnus Mills

- First edition
- Author: Magnus Mills
- Language: English
- Publisher: Bloomsbury
- Publication date: 2009
- Publication place: United Kingdom
- Media type: Print
- Pages: 160
- ISBN: 978-1-4088-0035-5

The Maintenance of Headway is a novel by English author Magnus Mills published in 2009 by Bloomsbury.

== Plot introduction ==
The book concerns bus-driving (Mills himself was once a bus-driver in London). The title refers to the concept (upheld by the inspectors) that "a fixed interval between buses on a regular service can be attained and adhered to". The novel concerns the tension between the officious inspectors and the drivers themselves who aim to arrive early.

== Reception ==
- The review form The Independent concluded with "There is no plot to speak of. (it) lacks the creepiness and intimations of apocalypse that haunt his previous work. But Mills's whimsy is always engaging, there are some brilliant jokes, and it is just the right length for a traffic-afflicted bus journey."
- The New Statesman said "Although the dialogue, which is littered with moments of sublimely deadpan humour, is the most impressive thing about the book, the plot is perfectly serviceable and engaging"
