= The Restraint of Beasts =

1998 novel by Magnus Mills

- First edition cover
- Author: Magnus Mills
- Language: English
- Genre: Tragicomedy
- Publisher: Flamingo
- Publication date: 7 September 1998
- Publication place: United Kingdom
- Media type: Print (Hardback & Paperback)
- Pages: 208
- ISBN: 0-00-225720-3

The Restraint of Beasts is a tragicomic debut novel, written by Magnus Mills. In it, an anonymous narrator "the foreman" works for a Scottish fencing company, run by Donald who is consumed by work and the desire for "efficiency". The narrator is promoted to foreman and put in charge of Tam and Richie who prefer a laissez-faire approach to work and so are at odds with both their management and their new foreman.

Mills' deadpan narrative voice is at times either revealing or naive, and both these interpretations of the narrator are supported throughout the text – it is up to the reader to decide where the narrator is ironic or genuinely emoting.

== Plot introduction ==
The novel starts with a phone call, "Mr McCrindle's fence has gone slack", and sees the three main characters duly dispatched to the scene of Tam and Richie's previous job, which they have left in a hurry. The ensuing Kafkaesque incidents set the tone for the rest of the novel, where Tam, Richie, and the narrator find themselves "sent off" to England in work-related "exile".

== Major themes ==
The Restraint of Beasts exhibits many issues and themes, most prominently that of work. Donald's drive for efficiency can be seen as thinly veiled fascism, whilst the "instability of three" deals with the balance of power between the narrator, Tam, and Richie. Since the narrator is a newly appointed foreman and cannot impose his will on either Tam or Richie he tries to reason with them: "We'd better have a go at getting this lot sorted out then." This results in a management style that conflicts with Donald, as obeying Donald implicitly is impractical: "it was clear that I would have to ignore unilaterally Donald's driving ban if we were going to get anything done at all". The theme of work as a domineering force in the lives of workers is prevalent throughout the novel, and is seen when the characters go back to Scotland from Mr Perkins's farm in England – Richie is confronted by the realisation that his boss Donald has implied to his mother that Richie was 'not coming back' and so the electric guitar Richie had his parents paying instalments on while he was away has been repossessed.

== Awards and nominations ==
The Restraint of Beasts won the McKitterick Prize for 1999. It was nominated for the Booker Prize and the Whitbread first novel award for 1999, and was also praised by the (usually reclusive) author Thomas Pynchon as "A demented, deadpan comic wonder".

== Adaptations ==
In 2006, Pawel Pawlikowski directed a film adaptation starring Rhys Ifans, Ben Whishaw, Eddie Marsan, and Warren Clarke but it was suspended in mid-production when the director's wife fell seriously ill and died. In 2010, he said "We'd shot 60% of the film when I had to stop. The material looks great, like nothing I've ever done or even seen before. It could have been really great, definitely original".
