= Hallucinating Foucault =

1996 novel by Patricia Duncker

- First edition (UK)
- Author: Patricia Duncker
- Language: English
- Genre: Novel
- Publisher: Serpent's Tail (UK); Ecco Press (US)
- Publication date: 1996
- Publication place: United Kingdom
- Media type: Print (Paperback)
- Pages: 178
- ISBN: 0-330-35177-X
- OCLC: 39103311
- Followed by: James Miranda Barry

Hallucinating Foucault is a 1996 novel by Patricia Duncker.

== Plot introduction ==
A postgraduate student goes to France to meet the object of his thesis, Paul Michel.

== Plot summary ==
A postgraduate student writing a thesis on the French writer Paul Michel starts a relationship with the Germanist, a girl he meets in the library, at Cambridge University. She encourages him to look at his biography more closely rather than only focus solely on the texts. They have dinner with her father; later in London he meets Jacques Martel, a friend of her father's who knows Paul Michel. He then decides to move to Paris to find him, and reads his letters to Michel Foucault in the library. He finds out Paul Michel lives in an asylum in Clermont-Ferrand. He arrives there at night and finds accommodation in Romagnat. He starts meeting with Paul Michel. Soon enough, they are allowed to spend whole days out in the gardens. Eventually, they manage to winkle a day outside of the premises. Michel gets attacked by a man in a bar and fights back. He then kisses the protagonist. Michel manages to trick the restaurant into believing they are with the town mayor and thus get off without being reported for the fight. Paul Michel is later granted two months away from the madhouse since the protagonist's visits have improved his condition considerably. The protagonist drives him down to Nice, where they stay with an old friend of his, Alain Legras, and his wife. During their stay they finally become lovers when Michel reassures the protagonist he needn't worry about his virtue and the protagonist argues asking if his opinion on the matter doesn't count. While the protagonist wants Michel to start writing again as part of his "recovery" Michel is, like the Germanist predicted, unable to do so because Foucault, his reader, is dead. Michel tells him about his relationship with Michel Foucault and claims that their relationship cannot last, that the protagonist must go on to write his thesis about him. Eventually, Michel gets up one night, takes the car and he kills himself, under the influence of drugs and alcohol. Although it is clear to all it was intentional.

After the funeral, the protagonist returns to England, writes his thesis and becomes the foremost expert on Paul Michel's writing, but fails to expand on the writer's life. His relationship with the Germanist, who flew to France to help him after the accident and got him through the funeral, ends after that, even though they move in similar academic circles.

== Characters ==
- The protagonist. He remains unnamed. He is writing a thesis on Paul Michel.
- Paul Michel, a French writer who won the Prix Goncourt and later lives in a madhouse. He dies in Gaillac.
- The Germanist, a postgraduate student. She smokes and lives on her own in a flat she owns in Cambridge. She grew up with two fathers (the Bank of England and Martin) after her mother left home. She is writing her thesis on Schiller but has read everything and has very definite and particular opinions. She's rather harsh with the protagonist, even though they are lovers, and with everybody else except her father.
- The Germanist's father, a homosexual who works for the Bank of England. He's fond of cooking and has "boys" who also are.
- Jacques Martel, a friend of the Germanist's father. He is Paul Michel's guardian and the lover of the Germanist's father.
- Mme Louet, a B&B hostess in Romagnat.
- Dr Pascale Vaury, Paul Michel's doctor at the Sainte-Anne asylum in Clermont-Ferrand.
- Alain Legras, a friend of Paul Michel's in Nice. His wife is named Marie-France.

== Allusions to other works ==
- Victor Hugo's Les Misérables, George Eliot's Middlemarch, and Christopher Smart are mentioned.
- Music is mentioned with Jean Michel Jarre and Beethoven is alluded to by Paul Michel "the greatest of composers heard his music in his nerves".
- The painter Hieronymus Bosch is mentioned.

== Allusions to actual history ==
- Gerrard Winstanley is briefly alluded to.
- The Germanist gives the protagonist an article on Paul Michel taken from Gai Pied.

== Literary significance and criticism ==
- The novel won the Dillions First Fiction Award.
