= Charles Booth (bishop) =

English clergyman

Styles of Charles Booth, D.C.L.
- Reference style: The Right Reverend
- Spoken style: My Lord or Bishop

Charles Booth, D.C.L. (died 1535) was a sixteenth-century clergyman who served as the Bishop of Hereford from 1516 to 1535.

== Ecclesiastical career ==
Prior to his episcopal appointment he held a number of ecclesiastical posts. The first of those was as the Treasurer of Lichfield Cathedral from 1495 to 1516. He was also appointed to three prebendaries at Lincoln Cathedral: Clifton (1501–1504), Farndon-cum-Balderton (1504–1516), and Reculversland (c.1507–1516). During that period, he was also the Archdeacon of Buckingham from 1505 to 1516.

He was nominated bishop of the diocese of Hereford by King Henry VIII on 22 April 1516 and appointed by papal provision on 21 July 1516. His consecration to the Episcopate took place on 30 November 1516. He was enthroned at Hereford Cathedral in January 1517 and received possession of the temporalities of the see on 19 February 1517.

He died in office on 5 May 1535.

== Bibliography ==
- Eubel, Konrad (1923). Hierarchia Catholica Medii Aevi (in Latin). Vol. 3. Monasterii Sumptibus et typis librariae. Archived from the original on 2 September 2006.
- Fryde, E. B.; Greenway, D. E.; Porter, S.; Roy, I., eds. (1986). Handbook of British Chronology (3rd, reprinted 2003 ed.). Cambridge: Cambridge University Press. ISBN 0-521-56350-X.
- Horn, J. M. (1962). Hereford Diocese. Fasti Ecclesiae Anglicanae 1300–1541. Vol. 2. British History Online.
- Horn, J. M. (2003). Coventry and Lichfield Diocese. Fasti Ecclesiae Anglicanae 1541–1857. Vol. 10. British History Online.
- King, H. P. F. (1962). Lincoln Diocese. Fasti Ecclesiae Anglicanae 1300–1541. Vol. 1. British History Online.

Religious titles
| Preceded by Robert Sherborne | Archdeacon of Buckingham; 1505–1516 | Succeeded by John Taylor |
| Preceded by Richard Mayew | Bishop of Hereford; 1516–1535 | Succeeded by Edward Foxe |
