= Magnus Mills =

English fiction writer, born 1954

- Born: 1954 (age 71–72); Birmingham, England
- Occupation: Writer
- Writing career
- Period: 1998–present
- Genres: Novels, short stories
- Notable works: The Restraint of Beasts, All Quiet on the Orient Express
- Notable awards: McKitterick Prize; 1999 The Restraint of Beasts

Magnus Mills (born 1954) is an English fiction writer and former bus driver. He is best known for his first novel, The Restraint of Beasts, which was shortlisted for the Booker Prize and praised by Thomas Pynchon.

== Background and literary career ==
Magnus Mills was born in Birmingham and brought up in Bristol. After graduating with an economics degree from Wolverhampton Polytechnic, he started a master's degree course at the University of Warwick but dropped out before completion.

Between 1979 and 1986 he built high-tensile fences for a living. In 1986 Mills moved to London and became a bus driver, which continues to be his full-time job alongside writing. During this time he wrote a regular column about being a bus driver for The Independent, claiming he was replaced by the serial Bridget Jones's Diary." In 1998 he drew on his experience as a fence builder for his first novel, The Restraint of Beasts. Some newspapers reported that he received an advance of £1 million for his debut; he later said the real figure was closer to £10,000. The Restraint of Beasts was shortlisted for the Booker Prize and the Whitbread First Novel Award in 1998. It won him the McKitterick Prize in 1999, and earned a rare jacket quote from reclusive author Thomas Pynchon, who called it "a demented, deadpan comic wonder".

Following the surprise success of The Restraint of Beasts and its follow-up, All Quiet on the Orient Express, Mills quit work as a bus driver for four months as a "project" to see if he could make it as a full-time writer. Three to See the King, published in 2001, was the result. It received positive reviews. He then worked as a van driver for several years, which resulted in The Scheme for Full Employment, published in 2003, but which had a more mixed reception. He was laid off from his job due to cutbacks and returned to working as a bus driver. His 2005 novel Explorers of the New Century was released to good reviews from The Sunday Times, The Independent, The Telegraph, and other papers. Having written his first four novels for Flamingo, Explorers of the New Century marked a new partnership with Bloomsbury.

Mills has also written four books of very short stories, including Once in a Blue Moon and Only When the Sun Shines Brightly for Acorn Books. His experience as a bus driver informed the content of his 2009 novel The Maintenance of Headway, the title of which refers to keeping buses equally spaced on their routes. His 2011 novel A Cruel Bird Came to the Nest and Looked In depicts a kingdom whose king has gone missing without explanation, leaving an absurdist realm "lost in an English fairy-tale world."

Mills's 2015 novel The Field of the Cloth of Gold was shortlisted for the 2015 Goldsmiths Prize.

In a 2024 interview Mills said he was no longer working as a bus driver.

== Style ==
Mills's style has been called "deceptively" simple. His prose style is rhythmic, often repetitious, and his humour is deadpan. He favours short sentences, little description and a lot of dialogue. Mills has cited Primo Levi as a key influence.

== Themes ==
Mills's books usually feature one or more working-class men as protagonists. In The Restraint of Beasts, an unnamed supervisor works alongside two Scottish fence-builders as they move from location to location building high-tensile steel fences. The theme of repetition is established early on, as the men fall into a routine of working during the day, going to the local pub at night and "accidentally" killing people along the way. The same kind of skewed repetition occurs in Mills's later works All Quiet on the Orient Express and The Scheme for Full Employment. All Quiet on the Orient Express is about a man who stops at a campsite in the Lake District to kill some time before embarking on a journey on the Orient Express. Gradually, he becomes involved in the local community and is offered jobs until it becomes clear that he may never leave. The Scheme for Full Employment tells of a "beautiful" scheme whereby people are employed to drive around on set routes, stopping at depots to offload the contents of their vans.

Freedom of will is a key theme in his work. What do the fences in The Restraint of Beasts suggest? Who, or what are the "beasts"? Can the protagonist of All Quiet on the Orient Express ever assert his freedom? Does it exist? This theme is explored most vividly in Three to See the King, whose characters live in a largely allegorical world that lacks many of the identifiable conventions of working-class life – they don't have jobs, pubs or anything more than a rudimentary social network. The main character attempts to establish simple freedom for himself within his small, beloved house, only to find himself at the mercy of unsolicited relationships and the ideology of a charismatic newcomer. Like most of Mills's characters, he remains desperately attached to his routine, attempting to meet each twist with a calm, reasonable approach, until it becomes impossible. In Explorers of the New Century, the characters begin as masters of their mules and the art of exploration, but as their journey continues, the harsh climate and terrain of the land strip them of control over their own destinies. At the outset of the book, the explorers are able to assign or deny freedom to their mules; by the end, most of the explorers are dependent on the mules for their own freedom.

Mills himself has talked about punishment and reward as being key themes in his work, particularly in The Restraint of Beasts. The leaders of the teams in Explorers of the New Century struggle with punishment as a means of encouraging and disciplining their mules, never able to achieve quite the results they desire, but fearful of interacting with the mules by any means more complex than punishment and reward.

== Bibliography ==
=== Novels ===
- The Restraint of Beasts (1998)
- All Quiet on the Orient Express (1999)
- Three to See the King (2001)
- The Scheme for Full Employment (2003)
- Explorers of the New Century (2005)
- The Maintenance of Headway (2009)
- A Cruel Bird Came to the Nest and Looked In (2011)
- The Field of the Cloth of Gold (2015)
- The Forensic Records Society (2017)
- Tales of Muffled Oars (2020)
- The Trouble with Sunbathers (2020)
- Sunbathers in a Bottle (2021)
- Mistaken for Sunbathers (2022)
- The Cure for Disgruntlement (2023)
- The Encouragement of Others (2024)
- The Assembly of the Swans (2026)

=== Short story collections ===
- Only When the Sun Shines Brightly (1999)
- Once in a Blue Moon (2003)
- Screwtop Thompson (2010)
- An Early Bath for Thompson (2025)
