= Complete Review =

Literary Website

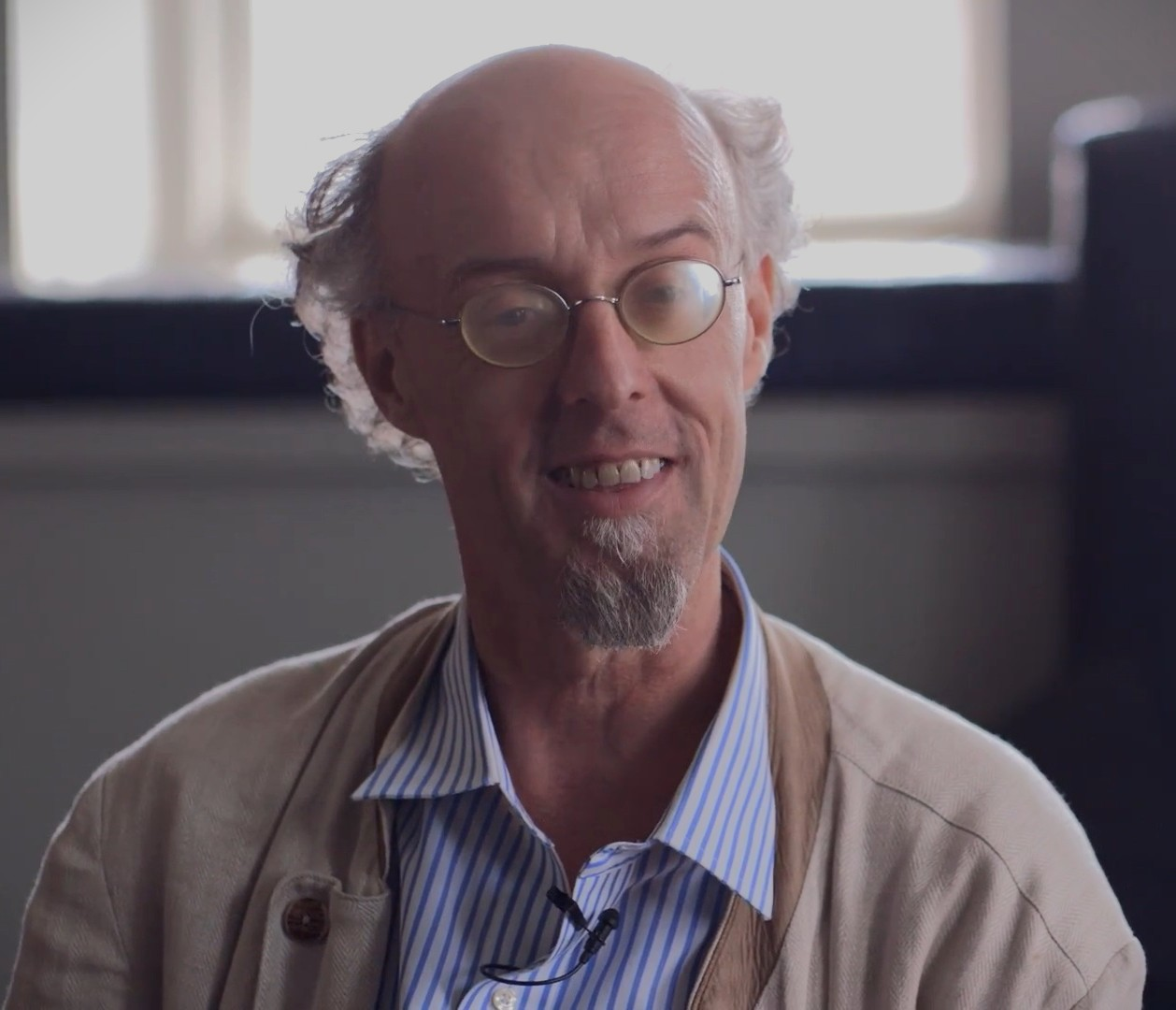
Orthofer in 2016

Complete Review (stylized complete review) is a literary website founded in March 1999. It is best known for reviews of novels in English translation, in particular drawing attention to otherwise neglected contemporary works from around the world, but there are also reviews of classics, non-fiction, drama and poetry. As of March 2009, on its tenth anniversary, there were a total of 2251 works under review, averaging over 250 new reviews added per year. A blog, Literary Saloon, was added in August 2002.

As of its 10th anniversary in 2009, 95 percent of the reviews were written by the site's founder and managing editor, Michael Orthofer (b. 1964, Austria). From the beginning, it was Orthofer's intention to create an institutionalized persona for the site, and he therefore did not sign his name or even have it anywhere easily visible. However, beginning in 2009 Orthofer, recognizing that he was the majority contributor, announced "posts and reviews will now be signed 'M.A.Orthofer', as I might as well lay claim to (and accept blame for) them."

On founding the site Orthofer said "I’ve always read a lot and been interested in literature, and I was interested in exploring the possibilities of the Internet. It struck me that while there were a lot of sites ... offering book reviews, practically no one was linking to other reviews of the same book, so that’s what I set out to do."

In 2010 Orthofer published a book about the website called The Complete Review: Eleven Years, 2500 Reviews. A Site History, with commentary on diverse and sundry related matters. In 2016, Orthofer published The Complete Review Guide to Contemporary World Fiction., a reader's guide to world literature with an emphasis on fiction published since the 1990s.

== Critical and popular reception ==
In October 2004, David Orr of the New York Times Book Review said "it remains one of the best literary destinations on the Web." In 2005, Time magazine included it as one of the 50 Coolest Websites 2005. John Freeman of the National Book Critics Circle said of the site in 2006, "The complete review seemed to appear out of nowhere, but suddenly it became one of the most useful aggregating sites on the web for book information and news, especially from abroad." Chad W. Post at the University of Rochester in 2009 said, "I don’t think there’s a reviewer, or publication, in America that’s as diverse as Michael Orthofer's Complete Review. Nor as meticulous about record keeping and self-aware about its reviewing trends." A February 2016 article in The New Yorker by Indian novelist Karan Mahajan featured an in-depth profile of the website and Orthofer.
