= Baconsthorpe Castle =

Grade I listed castle in Norfolk, UK

- Norfolk, England
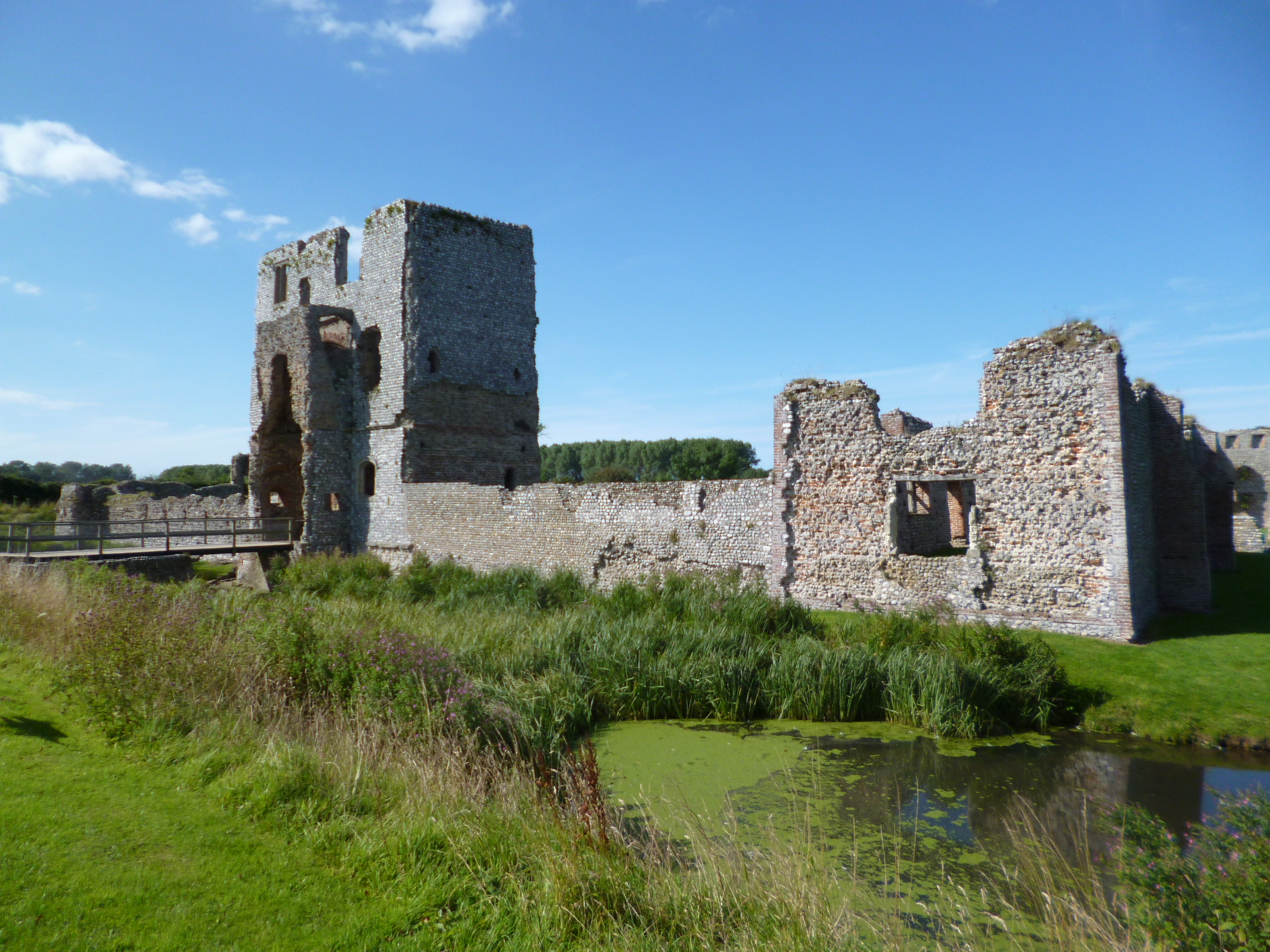
- The inner gatehouse of the castle, seen from the south-east

Site information
- Type: Fortified manor house
- Owner: English Heritage
- Open to the public: Yes
- Condition: Ruined

Location
- Shown within Norfolk
- Location within Norfolk
- Coordinates: 52.8985°N 1.1520°E

Site history
- Materials: Flint and brick

Baconsthorpe Castle, historically known as Baconsthorpe Hall, is a ruined, fortified manor house near the village of Baconsthorpe, Norfolk, England. It was established in the 15th century on the site of a former manor hall, probably by John Heydon I (Note: Historians typically distinguish the multiple, similarly named members of the Heydon family using ordinal numbers.) and his father, William. John was an ambitious lawyer with many enemies and built a tall, fortified house, but his descendants became wealthy sheep farmers, and being less worried about attack, developed the property into a more elegant, courtyard house, complete with a nearby deer park.

== Remains ==
By the end of the 16th century, the Heydons were spending beyond their means and the castle had to be mortgaged. Nonetheless, new formal gardens and a decorative mere were constructed alongside the house. Sir John Heydon III fought alongside the Royalists in the English Civil War and in retaliation was declared delinquent by Parliament in 1646. His fortunes did not recover and he began to demolish Baconsthorpe in 1650 in order to sell off its stonework. The outer gatehouse was turned into a private home and continued to be occupied until 1920, when one of its turrets collapsed. In the 21st century, the ruins of the castle are managed by English Heritage and open to visitors.

The remains of the castle consist of a moated inner court with mere to the north and an outer court and an outermost court to the south. The main surviving buildings are the inner, fortified gatehouse, dating from the 15th century, the long building used for wool manufacture, and the outer gatehouse, first built in the 16th century but much altered in later years. The outermost court holds part of the original barn, a large building that would have symbolised the Heydons' lordship of the manor.

== History ==
=== 15th century ===
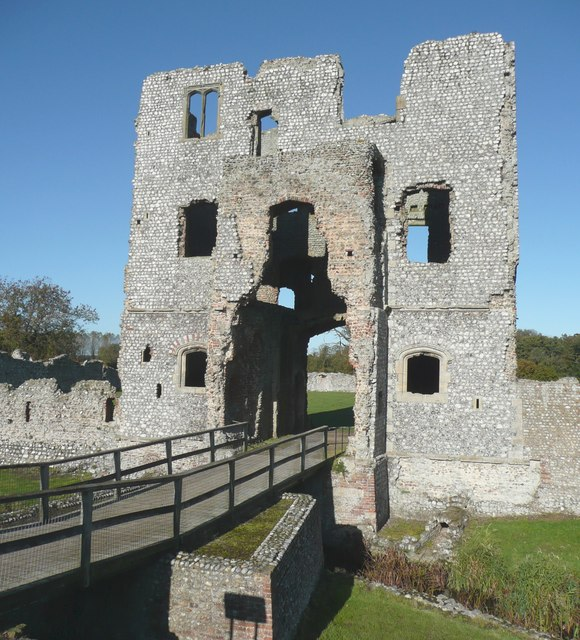
The 15th-century inner gatehouse, and the southern bridge over the moat

Baconsthorpe Castle was established by the Heydon family in the 15th century. The village of Baconsthorpe lay between Holt and Norwich, and was named after the local Bacon family. The village had two manor houses, the first in the main village and the other, called Wood Hall, on the outskirts. William Baxton had come from a relatively humble background, but by around 1400 he had bought the Bacon family's lands in the area, including half of the Wood Hall estate. William probably began the construction of the castle, then termed Baconsthorpe Hall, starting to construct the moated platform and the inner gatehouse around 1460.

William's son, John Heydon I, continued to develop the property and acquire more land around the area, changing his family name in the process to disguise his lower social origin. John was initially the political client of the William de la Pole, the Duke of Suffolk; after the duke's death, John Dudley, the Earl of Warwick became his next patron. John was an ambitious lawyer, and came to be hated and feared across the region as his power increased. By the time of his death in 1479, the inner gatehouse was completed and work on the courtyard house begun, creating the basis of a tall, fortified house. The castle demonstrated John's political aspirations and was intended to impress his peers in the region.

Sir Henry Heydon continued his father's work on the castle. Henry married into London money and became a wealthy sheep farmer, being knighted in 1485. He completed the castle's main house, service court and north-east tower. In the process, perhaps being less worried than his father about any attack on his property, he altered the character of Baconthorpe to produce what the historians Jacky Hall and Paul Drury term an "upmarket, courtyard house".

=== 16th century ===
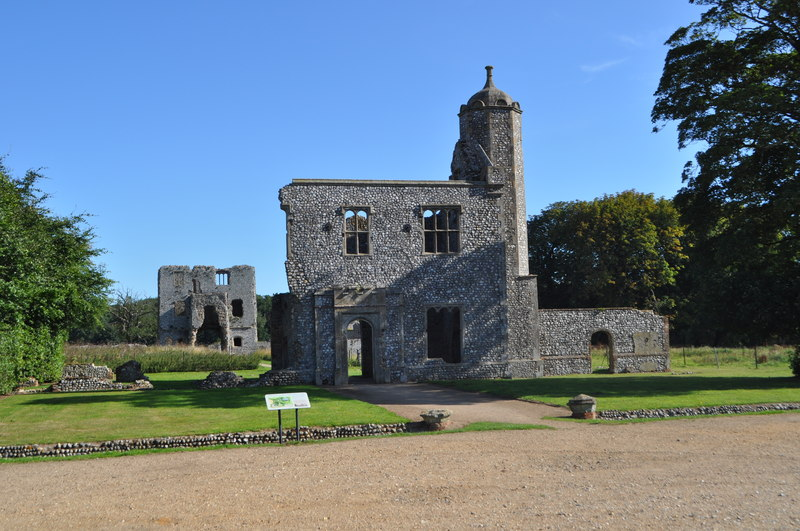
The 16th-century outer gatehouse, redesigned in the mid-17th and early 19th centuries

Over the course of the 16th century, the Heydons became one of the leading families in Norfolk, marrying well, practising law and enjoying the profits from their sheep and the wool trade – their products were sold in England and exported to the Netherlands. Sir John Heydon II inherited Baconsthorpe in 1504 but primarily lived at Saxlingham; after a pause in construction, he finished the construction of Baconsthorpe's north court and turned the east range of the castle into a wool factory before his death in 1550. His son, Sir Christopher I, then built the outer gatehouse and barn around 1560, and in 1561 was formally given a licence to crenellate the castle and create a 300-acre (120 ha) deer park alongside it.

The Heydons by then lived in lavish style, Sir Christopher maintaining a household of 80 servants and a coach drawn by two horses.

The castle was inherited by Sir William Heydon II in 1579, but by then the wool trade was in decline and the family was building up debts. Sir William sold off parts of the estate to cover his father's debts, but his business projects in London failed and he was forced to sell off further lands. Baconsthorpe was mortgaged, and under pressure from his creditors, William attempted to sell part of the estate in 1590. His son, Sir Christopher II, disagreed with this plan to dispose of what he regarded as his inheritance, and the father and son fell out. William threatened to demolish the castle, Christopher appealed to the Privy Council, and the matter went to court in 1593, a few months before William's death the same year.

Once Christopher II had inherited Baconsthorpe, he renovated the inner gatehouse and created a large mere and a formal garden around the south-east side of the castle, although he mainly resided at Saxlingham, west of Cromer. Christopher had little interest in business, preferring to engage in military pursuits and to study astrology – he hosted the mathematician Henry Briggs and the astronomer John Bainbridge at Baconsthorpe. Christopher had inherited debts of £11,000 from his father, in addition to his own debts of £3,000, and was fined £2,000 for his part in Essex's Rebellion of 1601. (Note: It is difficult to compare accurately early modern financial figures with modern equivalents. £11,000 in 1593 could compare to £2,700,000 in 2016 using a Consumer Price Index measure or to £860 million, using a share of Gross Domestic Product measure.) His financial situation did not improve. First Baconsthorpe and then his other estates had to be mortgaged.

=== 17th – 21st centuries ===
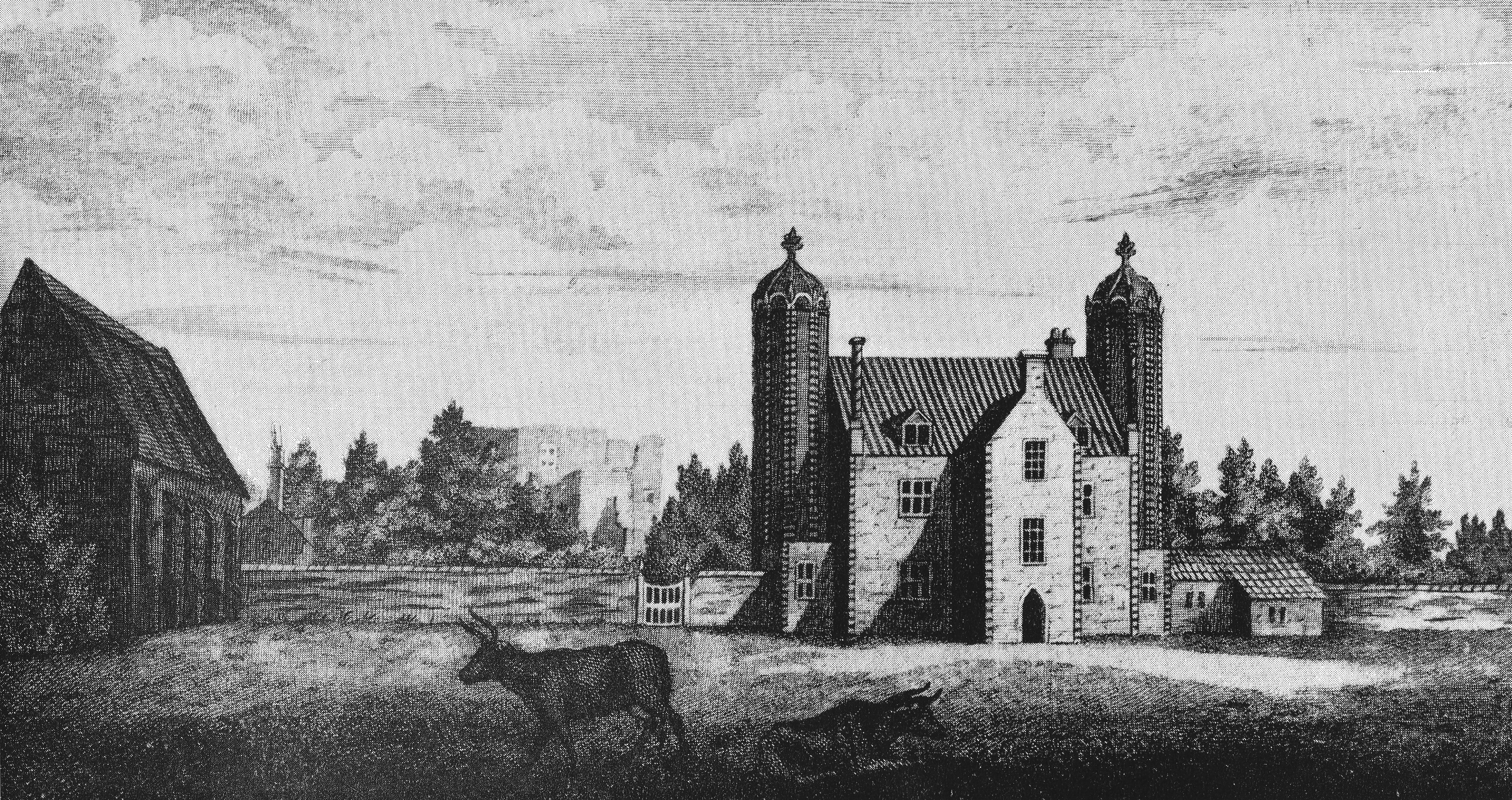
The outer gatehouse, depicted in 1781 in its role as a private house; the barn is shown to the left, with the ruins of the inner court in the background

Baconsthorpe passed to Christopher's eldest son Sir William in 1623, but William died four years later during the Île de Ré expedition, leaving it to his younger brother, Sir John III. John became the Lieutenant General of the Ordnance and when civil war broke out in 1642, he fought on the side of King Charles I. In response, Parliament seized his lands and he was declared delinquent in 1646. He bought his estates back, but began to demolish Baconsthorpe around 1650 in order to sell off the stonework.

John III died in debt in 1653, leaving the castle to his son, Charles Heydon, who continued to dispose of the stone: 29 cartloads were sold the following year for £30, for reuse at Felbrigg Hall. Charles' brother, William Heydon III, sold the estate to a Mr Bridges, and then onward to a doctor called Zurishaddai Lang, who lived in the outer gatehouse. The Norfolk landowner John Thruston Mott bought the estate in 1801, and the gatehouse continued to be occupied until 1920, when one of the turrets collapsed. Although the mere was still water-filled in 1839, it was subsequently drained.

In 1940, the castle's owner, the politician Sir Charles Mott-Radclyffe, placed the site into the care of the Ministry of Public Works. In the 1950s and 1960s, the site was cleared of ivy and other vegetation, the stonework consolidated and archaeologically surveyed, before being opened to the public. The mere was dredged and refilled in 1972 and further archaeological excavations were carried out. In the 21st century, Baconsthorpe Castle is managed by English Heritage and protected under UK law as Grade I and Grade II listed buildings and as a scheduled monument.

== Architecture ==
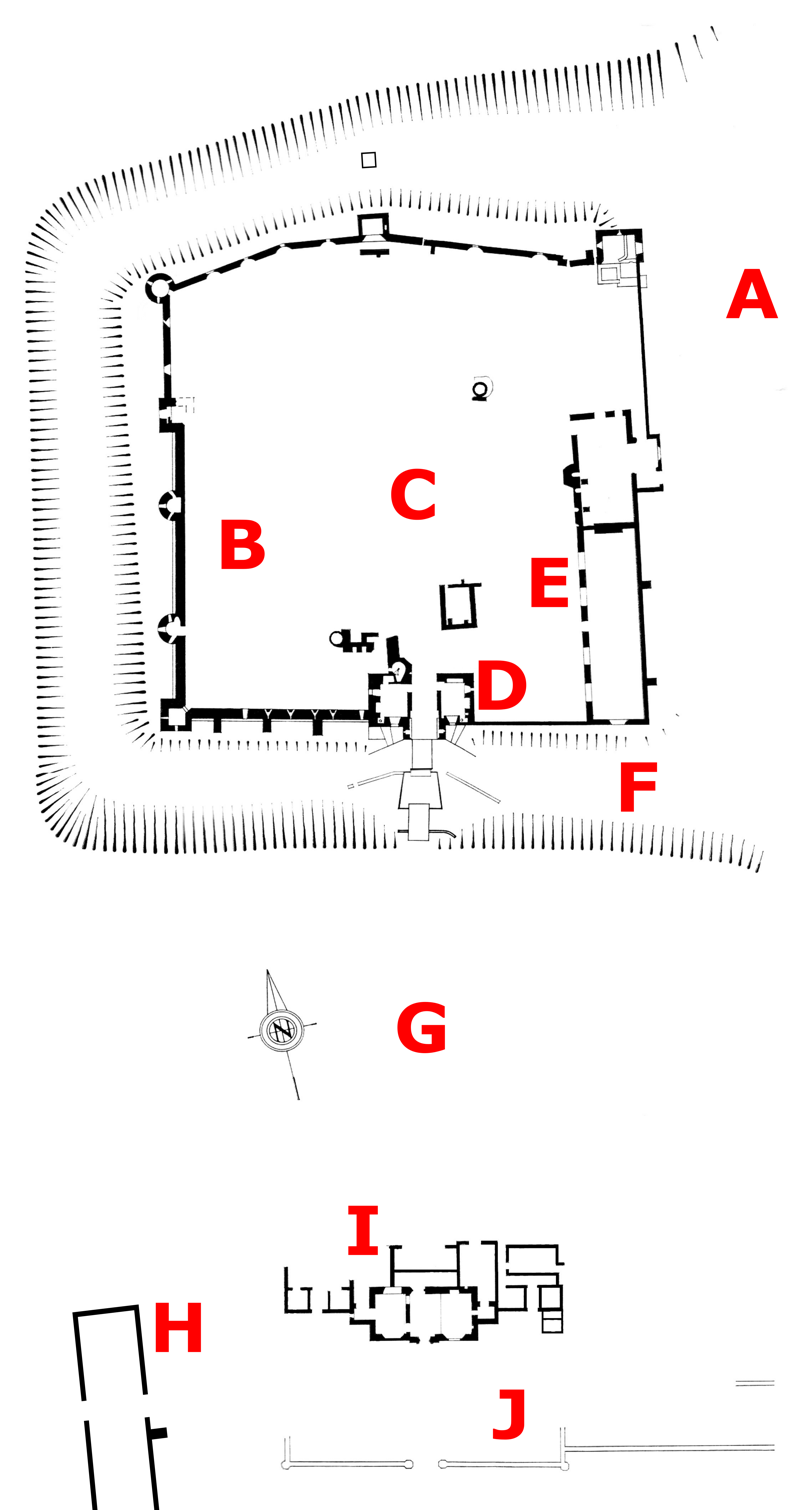
Plan of the castle; A – mere; B – site of courtyard house; C – inner court; D – inner gatehouse; E – long building; F – moat; G – outer court; H – barn; I – outer gatehouse; J – outermost court

Baconsthorpe Castle, located north of Baconthorpe village in a valley formed by the River Glaven, is approached on the remains of a raised causeway from the south. The site consists of a moated inner court and a mere to the north, with an outer and an outermost court to the south.

During the 16th century, the surrounding area formed pasture for sheep, although it is now used mainly for arable farming.

=== Outer and outermost courts ===
The outer and outermost courts lie progressively to the south of the outer court of the castle. The outermost court currently forms part of a farmyard and is subdivided by a low wall. A 16th-century barn lines its western edge. The barn is now 32 by 8 metres (105 by 26 ft) in size, but may originally have been up to 69 metres (226 ft) long, with three sets of large cart doors. The barn was intended both to impress visitors and to symbolize the Heydons' lordship of the manor – the exterior facings of the barn are superior on the south and east sides, where they would have been seen by those entering the castle. A row of cottages originally faced the barn on the other side of the court.

The ruined outer gatehouse that forms the entrance to the outer court was built from expensive knapped flint in a Perpendicular Gothic style. It consisted of a gate-passage, with rooms and octagonal turrets on either side and a large chamber on the first floor. When the gatehouse was converted into a residence in the 17th century, it was heavily altered: a three-storey porch was added to the front with wings on either side and additional rooms at the back of the building, but the porch was removed in the early 19th century, when crenellations were added. A wall originally ran round the outside of the outer court, which was used as a walled garden after the conversion of the gatehouse.

=== Inner court ===
The inner court rests on a square earth platform 65 metres (213 ft) across, surrounded by a water-filled moat up to 15 metres (49 ft) wide. The eastern edge of the moat meets with the 16th-century mere, about 90 by 110 metres (300 by 360 ft) across, which is fed by two streams and dammed on the eastern side. Beyond the mere lie the remains of a large, dammed pond, 30 metres (98 ft) across, which may have been designed as a decorative water feature to be viewed from the castle. A bridge on the south side links the inner and outer courts; originally the second part of the bridge formed a protective drawbridge.

The inner court is 55 by 56 metres (180 by 184 ft), surrounded by an external curtain wall up to 5 metres (16 ft) tall in places, protected by seven square and circular mural towers. The main entrance was through the southern bridge and the inner gatehouse, but the central north tower originally held a postern gate leading to another bridge over the northern edge of the moat, of which only the brick pier foundations survive. The castle was protected with gun loops: six double embrasures to the west of the gatehouse, a gun loop in the north-west square tower, and several larger gun loops in the northern section of the curtain wall. Inside the court, gun loops in the cellar beneath the hall covered the entrance itself. The militarily inspired design of the inner court drew on earlier medieval architectural traditions and was intended to reinforce the Heydons' status and symbolise their aspirations to nobility.

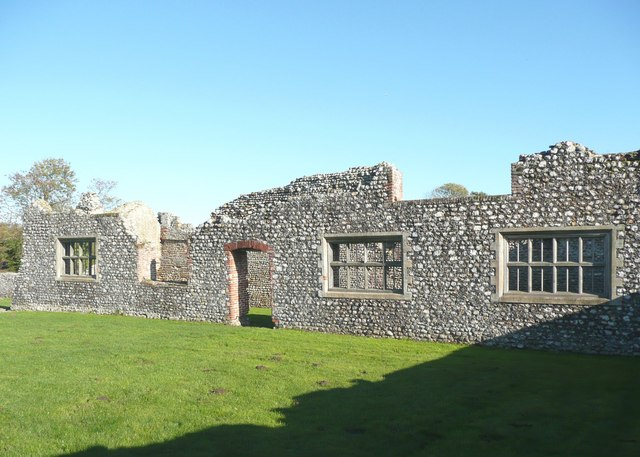
The roofless long building in the inner court, used for wool manufacture

The inner gatehouse is three storeys high, and like the rest of the inner court, built of flint rubble and brick faced with knapped flint. It has a gate passage with a two-storey vaulted porch. Two sets of chambers lay on either side of the passage, probably providing living space for the steward and the porter. The rooms above were fitted with fireplaces, garderobes and a small chapel to form a set of high quality, luxurious living space, possibly for the Heydons or their relations. The building could have been defended in case of attack. The south-west corner of the inner court held a courtyard house that was attached to the gatehouse and would have incorporated the castle's great hall. The northern part of the court probably formed a separate, private garden in the later period.

The north-east side of the inner court formed a service court, with kitchens and similar facilities, including a well. The eastern side of the inner court was adapted for the wool industry in the 16th century. This included the construction of a long, two-storey building along the curtain wall, 38 by 8 metres (125 by 26 ft). This was used for processing wool, with a turnstile at the north end for shearing sheep, and space on the first floor for weavers and finishers; the southern end may have held a wooden sink for washing wool, or alternatively been a drying floor and granary for the castle brewhouse and bakehouse. The three-storey north-east tower was also later used for processing wool, including fulling.

=== Garden ===
To the south-east, off the inner court, are the remaining earthworks of a formal garden on a raised platform, 80 by 65 metres (262 by 213 ft) across. The garden had a raised walkway round a square pond, 35 by 32 metres (115 by 105 ft) in size.

== See also ==
- Castles in Great Britain and Ireland
- List of castles in England

== Bibliography ==
- Coulson, Charles (2016). "Specimens of Freedom to Crenellate by Licence". In Liddiard, Robert (ed.). The Late Medieval Castle. Woodbridge, UK: The Boydell Press. pp. 221–240. ISBN 978-1-78327-033-0.
- Dallas, Carolyn; Sherlock, David (2002). Baconsthorpe Castle, Excavations and Finds, 1951–1972. Dereham, UK: Norfolk Archaeology and Museums Service. ISBN 978-0-905594-36-1.
- Goodall, John (2011). The English Castle, 1066–1650. New Haven, US and London, UK: Yale University Press. ISBN 978-0-300-11058-6.
- Rigold, S. E. (1966). Baconsthorpe Castle: Norfolk. London, UK: Her Majesty's Stationery Office. OCLC 460521202.
