= Church of Holy Trinity, Minories =

Former church-site in London

Coordinates: 51.512647°N 0.074632°W

Holy Trinity, Minories
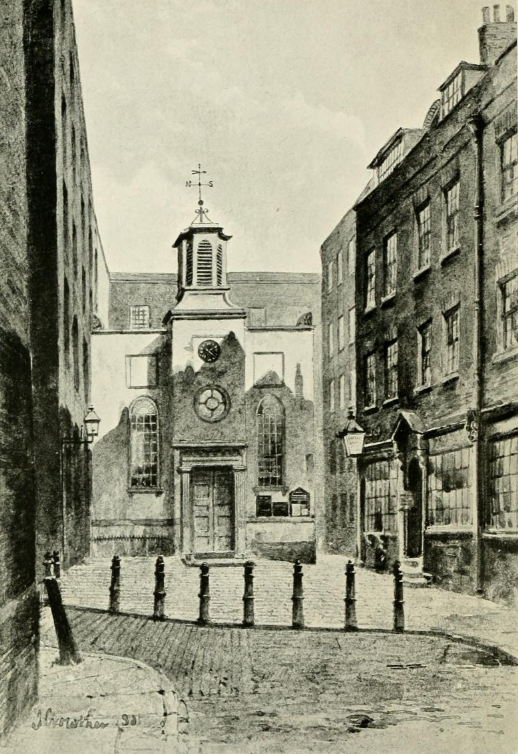
- A drawing published in 1907 of the west front of the Church of Holy Trinity, Minories.
- Holy Trinity, Minories
- Location: City of London
- Country: England
- Denomination: Church of England

History
- Founded: As an Abbey chapel, 1293; As a parish church, 1593

Architecture
- Years built: c. 1300, rebuilt 1706
- Closed: 1899
- Demolished: 1941

Holy Trinity, Minories, was a Church of England parish church outside the eastern boundaries of the City of London, but within the Liberties of the Tower of London and therefore in the East End of London. The liberty was incorporated in the Metropolitan Borough of Stepney in 1899, and today is within the City of London. Converted from the chapel of a nunnery, Holy Trinity was in use as a church from the 16th century until the end of the 19th century. It survived as a parish hall until it was destroyed by bombing during World War II.

== History ==
The parish covered an area previously occupied by the precincts of the Abbey of the Minoresses of St. Clare without Aldgate, founded by Edmund Crouchback, in 1293, for a group of French nuns of the Order of St. Clare who arrived with his second wife, Blanche of Artois. The nuns were also known as the Minoresses – which came to be adapted as the name for the district, Minories. The nunnery was surrendered to the Crown in 1539, during the Dissolution of the Monasteries, and the buildings, excluding the chapel, were used as an armory for the Tower of London, and later, as a workhouse. Some of the abbey buildings survived until their destruction by fire in 1797.

The nuns' chapel became a parish church. Considerable changes were made to the building: all the ancient monuments were removed, a gallery, a new pulpit and pews were installed, and a steeple was built. The first recorded reference to a dedication to the Holy Trinity dates from 1563. Later in the 16th century, the church was a Puritan stronghold, where both John Field and Thomas Wilcox preached. Until 1730, the church claimed the rights of a royal peculiar – including freedom from the authority of the Bishop of London; and the right to perform marriages "without licence".

Monuments in the church included those for William Legge (1608-1670), a commander for Charles I during the English Civil War, his wife, Elizabeth Washington (distantly related to George Washington) and their son, George Legge, 1st Baron Dartmouth. In 1849, a mummified head was found in the under-floor vaults, which was reputed to be that of Henry Grey, 1st Duke of Suffolk, who had been executed for treason by Mary I in 1554. The head was displayed in a glass case in the vestry, but later went to St Botolph's Aldgate where it was interred in a vault and eventually buried in the churchyard in 1990.

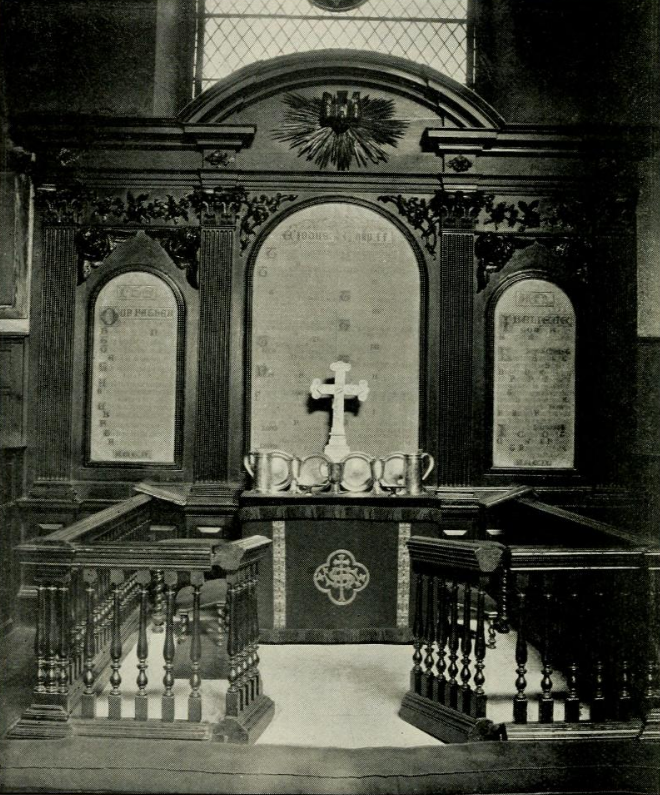
The 18th century altar and reredos at the east end of Holy Trinity, from a photograph published in 1898 shortly before the church closed.

The church escaped the Great Fire of London but fell into disrepair and was rebuilt in brick in 1706, retaining the north wall of the medieval building. The new church was a plain structure, a single space undivided by pillars or columns, 63 feet (19 m) long and 20 feet (6.1 m) wide, built at a cost of £700. The bells were housed in a wooden turret above the projecting porch.

== Burials ==
- William Legge (Royalist)
- George Legge, 1st Baron Dartmouth
- William Legge, 1st Earl of Dartmouth
- William Legge, 2nd Earl of Dartmouth
- George Legge, 3rd Earl of Dartmouth
- William Legge, 4th Earl of Dartmouth

== Closure and destruction ==
In 1899, the church was closed under the provisions of the Union of Benefices Act 1860 and united with the parish of St Botolph's Aldgate. The pulpit was taken to All Saints Church, East Meon in 1906. The former church was used as a parish room until destroyed by bombing during the Second World War. The medieval north wall survived until the clearance of the site in 1956–8.

== Sources ==
- Collins, F.J. (1961). "Notes on the Church of Holy Trinity Minories". Transactions of the London and Middlesex Archaeological Society. 20: 160–5.
- Hughson, David (1805). London. Vol. 2. London: J. Stratford. p. 186.
- Tomlinson, Edward Murray (1907). A History of the Minories. London: Smith, Elder & Co.
