= Waterbeach (disambiguation) =

Waterbeach is a large village in Cambridgeshire, United Kingdom. It may also refer to:

- Waterbeach railway station, serving the village
- RAF Waterbeach and Barracks, a former military base near the village
- Waterbeach Abbey, a former abbey near the village
- Waterbeach, West Sussex, England
- The Waterbeach, a health spa in Goodwood House, near Westhampnett, West Sussex, United Kingdom
