= David Walter (courtier) =

David Walter (died 1679) was an English Cavalier who served as Lieutenant General of the Ordnance under Charles II of England. Walter was the third son of the judge Sir John Walter.

In 1636, Walter inherited Wolvercote upon the death of his stepmother. He married Elizabeth, the daughter of Paul Bayning, 2nd Viscount Bayning, but had no children. He was Elizabeth's second husband.

== Career ==
He was appointed the Royalist High Sheriff of Oxfordshire in 1645. In September 7, 1645, he led the Royalists alongside Colonel Ledge (then Governor of Oxford) in a raid against the Parliamentary forces in Thame led by Colonel Richard Greaves.

During the reign of Charles I, he was a colonel of a regiment of horse. After the English Restoration, he was rewarded for his support of the King with an appointment as Groom of the Bedchamber and as the Chief Baron of the Exchequer. In 1670, he was appointed Lieutenant General of the Ordnance, and held that office until his death in 1679. Wolvercote passed to his nephew, Sir William Walter, 2nd Baronet.

Military offices
Preceded by William Legge	Lieutenant General of the Ordnance; 1670–1679	Succeeded by George Legge
