= Edward Randolph (disambiguation) =

Edward Randolph (1690–after 1756) was a ship captain and London tobacco merchant.

Edward Randolph is also the name of:

- Edward Randolph (colonial administrator) (1632–1703), English colonial administrator
- Edward Randolph (soldier) (died 1566), English soldier
- Edward H. Randolph (1858–1934), American lawyer from Louisiana
- Ned Randolph (1942–2016), Louisiana congressman
