= Saxlingham =

Village in Norfolk, England

Coordinates: 52.91522°N 1.01254°E

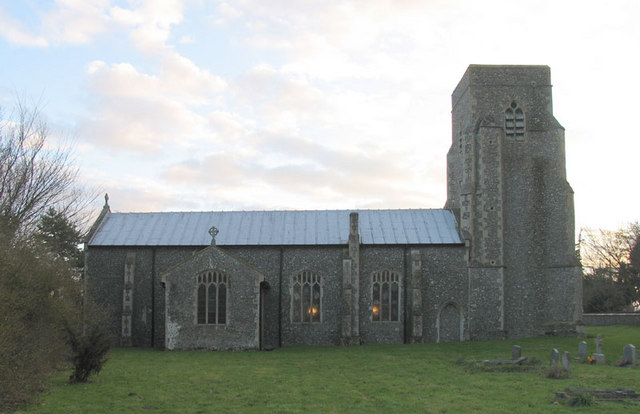
- St Margaret's Church, Saxlingham

- Location within Norfolk
  - London: 126 miles (203 km)
- Civil parish: Field Dalling
- District: North Norfolk
- Shire county: Norfolk
- Region: East
- Country: England
- Sovereign state: United Kingdom
- Post town: HOLT
- Postcode district: NR25
- Dialling code: 01328
- Police: Norfolk
- Fire: Norfolk
- Ambulance: East of England
- UK Parliament: North Norfolk

Saxlingham is a village and former civil parish, now in the parish of Field Dalling, in the North Norfolk district, in the county of Norfolk, England. It lies 13 miles (21 km) west of Cromer, 26 miles (42 km) north-west of Norwich, 3.6 miles (5.8 km) west of the town of Holt and 126 miles (203 km) north-east of London. In 1931 the parish had a population of 122.

== Transport and governance ==
The nearest railway station is at Sheringham on the Bittern Line, which provides hourly trains between Sheringham, Cromer and Norwich. The nearest flights are at Norwich International Airport.

The village lies in North Norfolk district. For Westminster elections, it is in the constituency of North Norfolk.

== History ==
The village name means "homestead or village of Seaxel's or Seaxhelm's people".

Saxlingham appears in the 1086 Domesday Book, under the names Saxelinghham and Saxelingaham. The main tenant of the manor at the time was Bishop William Peter de Valognes.

On 1 April 1935 the parish was abolished and merged with Field Dalling.

== Historic buildings ==
The Parish Church of Saint Margaret was built mainly in the 15th century. It was extensively restored by a benefactor, Sir Alfred Jodrell, in 1896, giving it an appearance of more recent construction. Inside is a font from the 15th century and an ironbound chest of the same period. In a niche is an alabaster figure of an Elizabethan lady kneeling on a tasselled cushion, commemorating the daughter of Sir Christopher Heydon.

To the east of the church stands the once ruined Heydon Hall, built in 1581–1584 as home to Sir John Heydon II before he moved to Baconsthorpe Castle. It is Grade II listed on the National Heritage List for England and is a scheduled monument. The house was recently restored and renamed and is now a private residence.

Saxlingham Rectory (early 19th century) is Grade II listed.
