= George Legge, 1st Baron Dartmouth =

Royal Navy officer and politician (1647–1691)

Admiral of the Fleet The Right Honourable The Lord Dartmouth PC
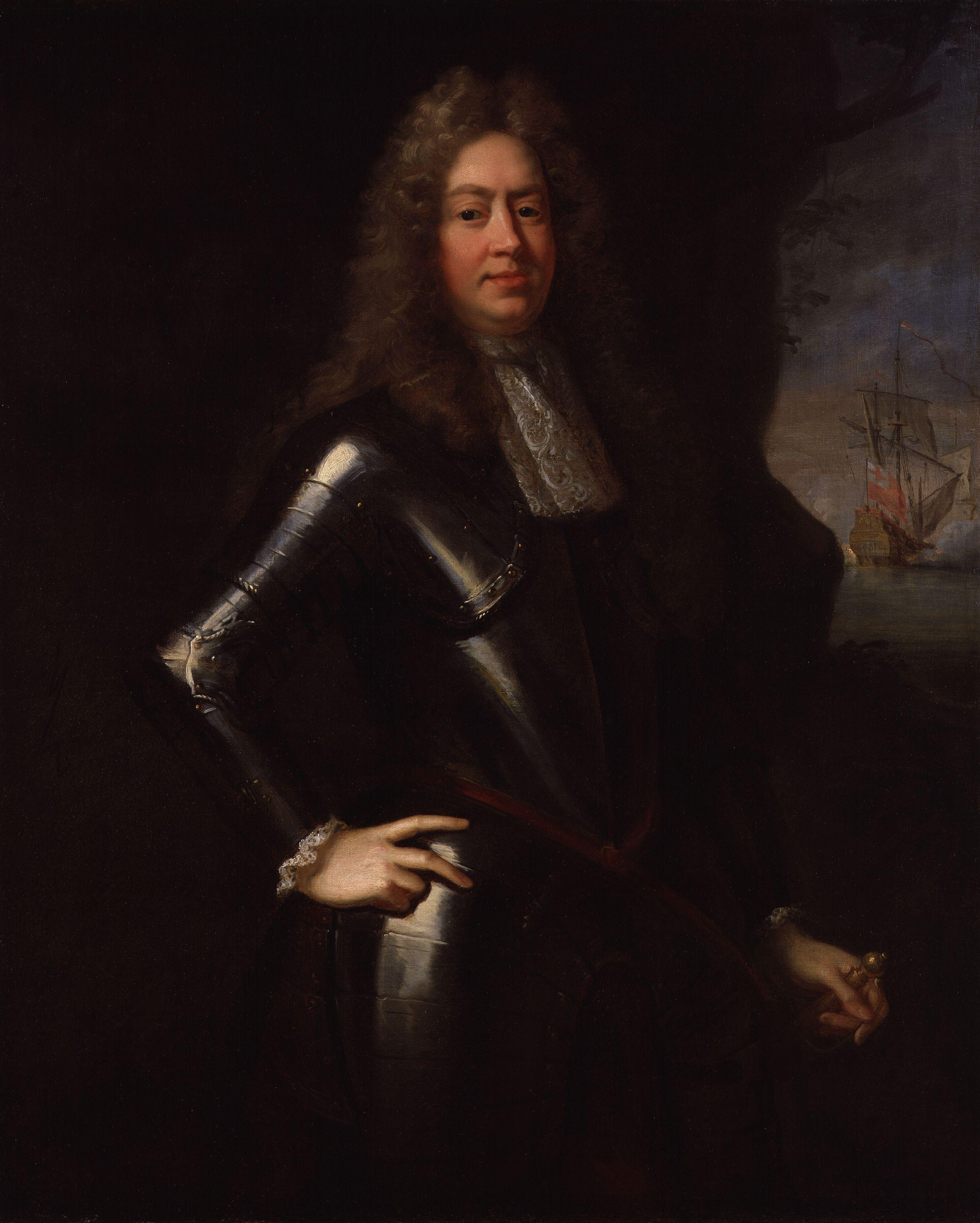
- Portrait attributed to John Riley, c. 1685–1690

Admiral of the Fleet
- In office 24 September 1688 – 10 January 1689

Lord Lieutenant of the Tower Hamlets
- In office June 1685 – December 1688

Constable of the Tower
- In office June 1685 – December 1688

Governor of Tangiers
- In office September 1683 – February 1684

Master-General of the Ordnance
- In office 1681–1689

Member of Parliament for Portsmouth
- In office February 1679 – February 1685

Governor of Portsmouth
- In office 1673–1682

Member of Parliament for Ludgershall
- In office February 1673 – January 1679

Personal details
- Born: c. 1647 London
- Died: 25 October 1691 (aged 44) Tower of London
- Resting place: Church of Holy Trinity, Minories
- Spouse: Barbara Archbold (m 1667-1718)
- Children: William (1672-1750); Mary (died 1753); Six other daughters
- Education: King's College, Cambridge
- Occupation: Naval officer

Military service
- Years of service: 1667–1689
- Rank: Admiral
- Commands: HMS Pembroke; HMS Fairfax; HMS Royal Katherine;
- Battles/wars: Second Anglo-Dutch War; Four Days' Battle; Third Anglo-Dutch War; Solebay; Schooneveld; Texel; 1688 Invasion of England

George Legge, 1st Baron Dartmouth, PC (c. 1647 – 25 October 1691) was a Royal Navy officer and politician who was appointed Admiral of the Fleet by James II of England in September 1688. However, he failed to intercept a Dutch invasion force under William of Orange that landed at Torbay on 5 November 1688 and was dismissed following the Glorious Revolution.

== Personal details ==
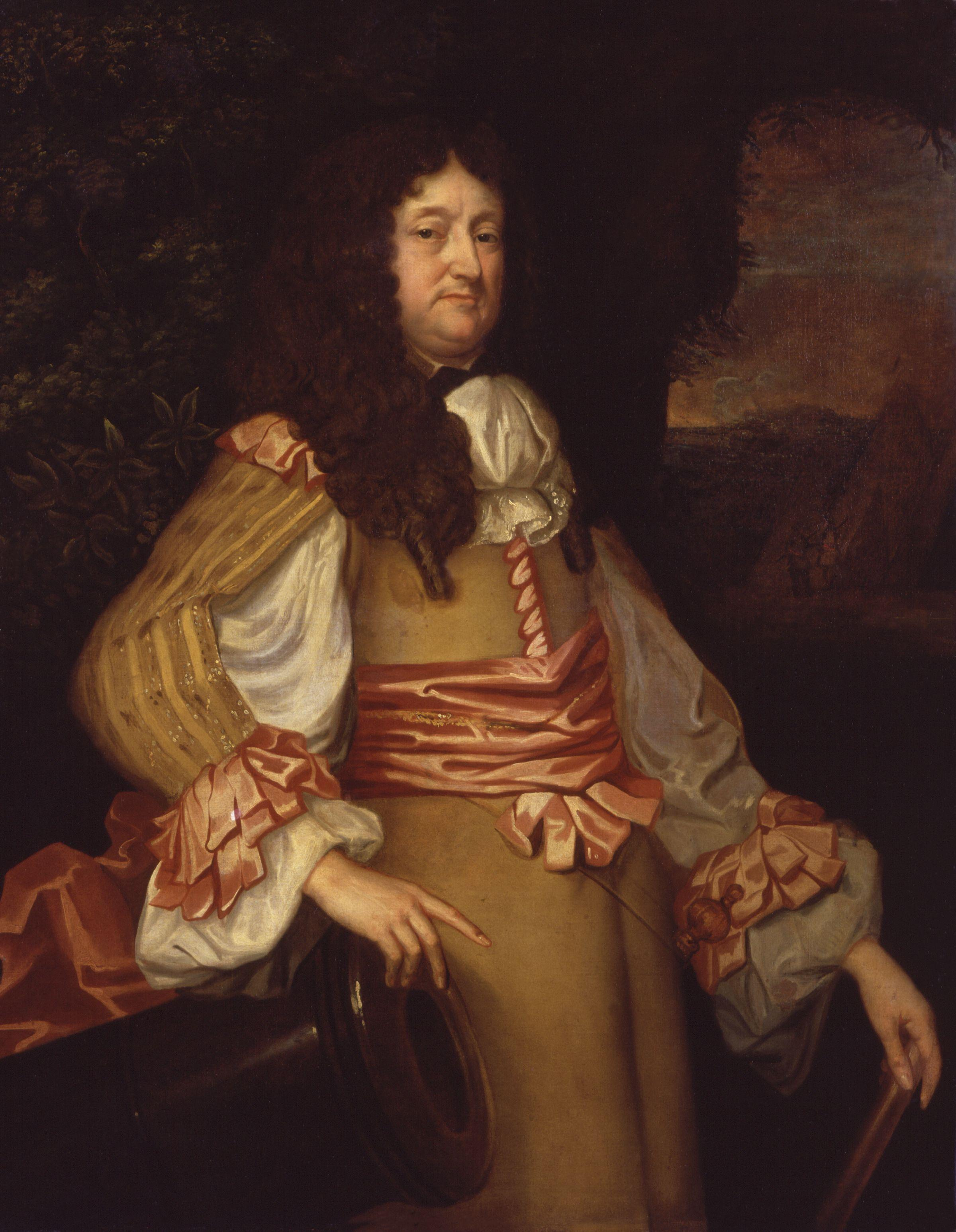
A portrait of William Legge

George Legge was born c. 1647, the eldest son of Colonel William Legge and his wife Elizabeth Washington (c.1616–1688). A close friend of Prince Rupert of the Rhine, Colonel Legge served in the Royalist army during the Wars of the Three Kingdoms and was arrested several times during The Protectorate for conspiring to restore Charles II. After the Stuart Restoration in 1660, he was appointed Lieutenant-General of the Ordnance, a position he held from 1660 to 1670.

George's younger brother William (circa 1650–1697) was "a wild, profane creature" who allegedly killed a man while still in his teens. but was elected MP for Portsmouth in 1685. His sister Mary (1647–1715) married diplomat and politician Sir Henry Goodricke (1642–1705).

In November 1667 George married Barbara Archbold (1650–1718), daughter of Sir Henry Archbold of Abbots Bromley in Staffordshire; they had a son, William (1672–1750), and seven girls. His daughter Mary (died 1753) married Sir Philip Musgrave (1661–1689), who served under Legge as Lieutenant-General of the Ordnance from 1682 to 1687.

== Career ==
Educated at Westminster School and King's College, Cambridge, Legge began his naval career during the Second Anglo-Dutch War, when he served as a volunteer under his cousin Admiral Sir Edward Spragge in the 1666 Four Days' Battle. Thanks to these connections, at the age of twenty in April 1667 he was made Captain of HMS Pembroke, a 28-gun fifth-rate, which sank on 11 May following a collision with HMS Fairfax near Torbay.

Despite this inauspicious beginning, he was appointed Groom of the Chamber to the future James II of England in 1669, then given command of HMS Fairfax in January 1672. In late March, he took part in an attack on a Dutch Levant Company convoy in the Channel, which was beaten off by its escort but became an immediate cause of the Third Anglo-Dutch War. In June he fought in the Battle of Sole Bay. The following year he commanded HMS Royal Katherine under Prince Rupert of the Rhine in the Battle of Schooneveld.

By 1683 Legge had risen to be Admiral and he was sent out to Tangier with Samuel Pepys to oversee the evacuation and destruction of the ill-fated English colony there. His last naval appointment was to the command of a fleet in the channel which unsuccessfully attempted to intercept the invasion force led by William III of Orange that landed in 1688 at the beginning of the Glorious Revolution. The same year he was appointed the first Admiral of the Fleet. In this capacity he refused to follow Lord Dover's orders to help prepare a ship to enable the escape of the Prince of Wales from Portsmouth in November 1688.

== Death ==
Following the abdication of James II, Dartmouth was dismissed by the triumphant William III, and imprisoned in the Tower of London in July 1691. He died in the Tower a few months later, on 25 October, without having been brought to trial, and was buried, as his father had been, in the church of the Holy Trinity, Minories, in London. He was succeeded as Baron Dartmouth by his only son, William Legge, 1st Earl of Dartmouth (1672–1750).

== Sources ==
- Archbold, William Arthur Jobson (1892). "Jermyn, Henry (1636-1708)" . In Lee, Sidney (ed.). Dictionary of National Biography. Vol. 29. London: Smith, Elder & Co.
- Clodfelter, Micheal (1992). Warfare and Armed Conflicts: A Statistical Reference to Casualty and Other Figures, 1500–2000. McFarland & Co. ISBN 978-0786474707.
- Davies, J.D. (2004). "Legge, George, first Baron Dartmouth (c.1647–1691)". Oxford Dictionary of National Biography (online ed.). Oxford University Press. doi:10.1093/ref:odnb/16352. (Subscription, Wikipedia Library access or UK public library membership required.)
- Naylor, Leonard (1983). MUSGRAVE, Philip (1661-89), of Westminster in The History of Parliament: the House of Commons 1660–1690. CUP. ISBN 978-1107002258.
- Roy, Ian (2004). "Legge, William (1607/8–1670)". Oxford Dictionary of National Biography (online ed.). Oxford University Press. doi:10.1093/ref:odnb/16348. (Subscription, Wikipedia Library access or UK public library membership required.)
- Watson, Paula (2004). "Goodricke, Sir Henry, second baronet (1642-1705)". Oxford Dictionary of National Biography (online ed.). Oxford University Press. doi:10.1093/ref:odnb/10981. (Subscription, Wikipedia Library access or UK public library membership required.)
- Watson, Paula (1983). LEGGE, William II (c.1650-c.1697) in The History of Parliament: the House of Commons 1660–1690. CUP. ISBN 978-1107002258.

Parliament of England
Preceded by William Ashburnham; Thomas Grey	Member of Parliament for Ludgershall; 1673–1679; With: William Ashburnham	Succeeded by Thomas Neale; John Smith
Preceded by Richard Norton; Sir George Carteret, Bt	Member of Parliament for Portsmouth; 1679–1685; With: Sir John Kempthorne 1679; Richard Norton 1679–1685	Succeeded by William Legge; Henry Slingsby
Military offices
Preceded by The Duke of York	Governor of Portsmouth; 1673–1682	Succeeded by The Earl of Gainsborough
Preceded by David Walter	Lieutenant-General of the Ordnance; 1679–1682	Succeeded by Christopher Musgrave
Preceded by In Commission	Master-General of the Ordnance; 1682–1688	Succeeded by Frederick Schomberg
Preceded by Sir Percy Kirke	Governor of Tangier; 1683–1684	Succeeded by none (re-incorporated into Morocco)
New regiment	Colonel of The Ordnance Regiment; 1685–1689	Succeeded by The Earl of Marlborough
Political offices
Preceded by The Duke of Richmond	Master of the Horse; 1685–1689	Succeeded by Henry de Nassau, Lord Overkirk
Honorary titles
Preceded by The Lord Alington	Constable of the Tower; Lord Lieutenant of the Tower Hamlets; 1685–1688	Succeeded by The Lord Lucas
Peerage of England
New title	Baron Dartmouth; 1682–1691	Succeeded by William Legge
