= John Walter (judge) =

English judge (1566–1630)

Sir John Walter (1566 – 17 November 1630) was an English judge and Member of Parliament.

== Biography ==
Walter was educated at Brasenose College, Oxford and the Inner Temple. He was called to the bar in 1590 and became a bencher of his inn in 1605. He practised in the Exchequer and Chancery courts, becoming counsel to the University of Oxford, and in 1613 was appointed attorney general and trustee to the Prince of Wales. He purchased the manor of Wolvercote from George Owen in 1616, and Cutteslowe from John Lenthall between 1611 and 1625.

He was knighted in 1619, and in 1621 was elected to Parliament as member for East Looe. In 1625 he was appointed Chief Baron of the court of the Exchequer. Having opposed Charles I over the law of treason, in 1630 he was ordered not to sit again as a judge.

== Personal life, family, and death ==
He married, firstly, Margaret Offley, daughter of William Offley, and they had these children:

- Sir William Walter, 1st Baronet (c. 1604 – 1675)
- Edward Walter
- David Walter (died 1679), of Godstow
- John Walter
- Mary Walter, married Sir John Cope
- Elizabeth Walter (1613–1701), married Sir Francis Burdett.
- Catherine Walter
- Margaret Walter

After the death of his first wife he was remarried, in 1622, to Anne Witham, daughter of William Witham. This marriage was childless.

He settled Wolvercote on Anne and any children he might have with her (there were none), with remainder to David; she died childless in 1636.

He died on 17 November 1630 and was buried at Wolvercote in Oxfordshire.

Legal offices
Preceded by Sir Lawrence Tanfield	Lord Chief Baron of the Exchequer; 1625–1630	Succeeded by Sir Humphrey Davenport
