= William Legge (Royalist) =

English army officer and politician (1608–1670)

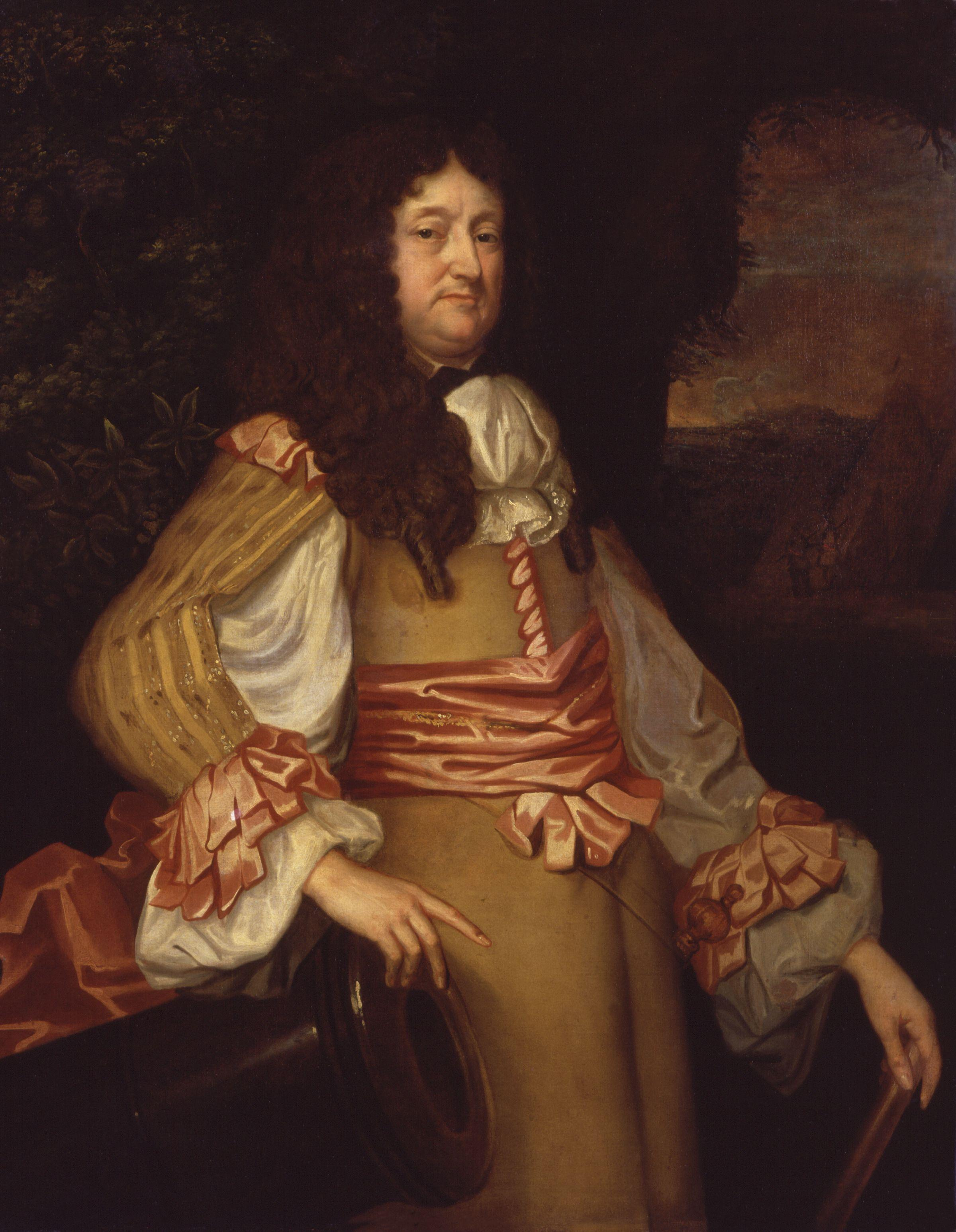
c. 1670 portrait of Legge by Jacob Huysmans

William Legge (c. 1608 – 13 October 1670) was an English army officer and politician. A close associate of Prince Rupert of the Rhine, he fought on the Royalist side during the English Civil War.

== Early life ==
He was the eldest son of Edward Legge, who was vice-president of Munster by the influence of his kinsman the Earl of Devonshire, by Mary, daughter of Percy Walsh of Moy valley, co. Kildare. Edward Legge died in 1616, and William was brought to England by Henry Danvers, 1st Earl of Danby, his godfather. He gained military experience in continental Europe.

On 7 August 1638 Legge was commissioned to inspect the fortifications of Newcastle and Hull, and to put both in a state of defence. Thomas Wentworth, 1st Earl of Strafford vigorously remonstrated against the proposal to make him captain of Hull in place of Sir John Hotham. Legge, however, was appointed Master of the Armoury and lieutenant of the ordnance for the First Bishops' War.

In the spring of 1641 he was implicated in the plots for making use of the army to support the king against the parliament. Though examined as a witness with reference to the First Army Plot (18 May), he was not seriously implicated in it. A few weeks later, however, he was entrusted by the king with a petition denouncing the parliamentary leaders, for which he was to obtain signatures in the army, and played a leading part in what is termed the Second Army Plot. In January 1642 the king attempted to obtain possession of Hull, appointed the Earl of Newcastle governor, and despatched Legge to secure the town, but the attempt failed.

== Civil War ==
On the outbreak of the First English Civil War Legge joined the king's army, and was taken prisoner in a skirmish at Southam, Warwickshire, on 23 August 1642. Committed by the House of Commons to the Gatehouse Prison he escaped about 4 October 1642, and rejoined King Charles at Oxford. Henceforth he closely attached himself to Prince Rupert, and was wounded and again taken prisoner while under his command at the siege of Lichfield in April 1643. At the Battle of Chalgrove Field on 18 June 1643 he was temporarily taken prisoner on the field. After the first Battle of Newbury (20 September 1643), the king presented him with an ornate hanger and wanted to knight him. On 19 May 1644 Prince Rupert appointed him temporary Governor of Chester.

After the death of Sir Henry Gage (January 1645), Legge succeeded him as governor of Oxford, and took over command of the Oxford City Regiment. He received a commission from Rupert authorising him to command in chief all the neighbouring garrisons except Banbury (7 May), and was appointed a Groom of the Bedchamber (12 April). During his governorship Oxford was besieged or blockaded by Thomas Fairfax (May–June 1645). Legge's attachment to Prince Rupert led to his removal from command when the prince was disgraced for his hasty surrender of Bristol. When the king returned to Oxford Legge was released, and acted again to serve the king as his Groom of the Bedchamber; he used the opportunity to try to heal the breach with Rupert, and urged the prince to submit to the king.

After the fall of Oxford, Legge went abroad, returning to England about July 1647 to wait on the king, then in the custody of the army. He concerted, with Sir John Berkeley and Ashburnham, the king's escape from Hampton Court, and never left him during his flight to the Isle of Wight. Parliament ordered Colonel Robert Hammond to send up Legge and his two companions as prisoners; but on Hammond's request allowed them to remain with King Charles until 29 December 1647. For some months Legge and Ashburnham lingered in Hampshire, endeavouring to contrive the king's escape, but they were apprehended on 19 May, and Legge was confined in Arundel Castle. On 2 September 1648 the House of Lords refused him leave to attend the king during the Treaty of Newport.

Legge promised not to bear arms against the parliament, and was allowed to compound, and released. King Charles I at once dispatched him on a mission to Ireland, but, after the King's overthrown and execution, Legge was captured at sea in July 1649, and imprisoned in Exeter Castle on a charge of high treason for two years or more. In March 1653 he was granted a pass to go abroad, on giving security to do nothing prejudicial to the state. On 11 March 1659 he was one of five commissioners empowered by Prince Charles of Stuart (in exile during the Protectorate prior to returning as King Charles II in 1660) to treat with all rebels not actual regicides, and promise pardon in reward for assistance. In 1659 Legge was again in England, preparing a royalist rising, and sanguine of success. From July to 30 September 1659, however, he was held prisoner in the Tower of London.

== Restoration ==
On the Restoration in 1660 Charles II offered to create Legge an earl, but he declined. Charles II restored him to his old posts as Groom of the Bedchamber and Master of the Armouries, and also appointed him Lieutenant-General of the Ordnance. As lieutenant he also enjoyed the post of treasurer of the ordnance, and was granted by the king the lieutenancy of Alice Holt Forest and Woolmer Forest in Hampshire, lands in the county of Louth, and a pension for his wife. He was Member of Parliament for Southampton from 1661 to 1670.

== Private life ==
On 2 March 1642, Legge married Elizabeth Washington (c. 1616–1688), "sister of another future royalist officer, Colonel Henry Washington". Her father, Sir William Washington, was the elder brother of Lawrence Washington, great-great grandfather of George Washington, while her mother, Anne Villiers, was the half-sister of James I's favourite, George Villiers, 1st Duke of Buckingham.

He died at his house in the Minories, near the Tower, on 13 October 1670, and was buried in the vault of the north chancel in the church of Holy Trinity, Minories.

With his wife Elizabeth, William Legge left three sons and two daughters. His eldest son, George, was created Baron Dartmouth in 1682. His son William was Member of Parliament for Portsmouth in 1685.

Colonel Legge is often confused with Mr. William Legge, Keeper of the wardrobe from 1626 to 1655.
