= Lieutenant-General of the Ordnance =

Former senior British Army appointment

Office of the Lieutenant-General of the Ordnance
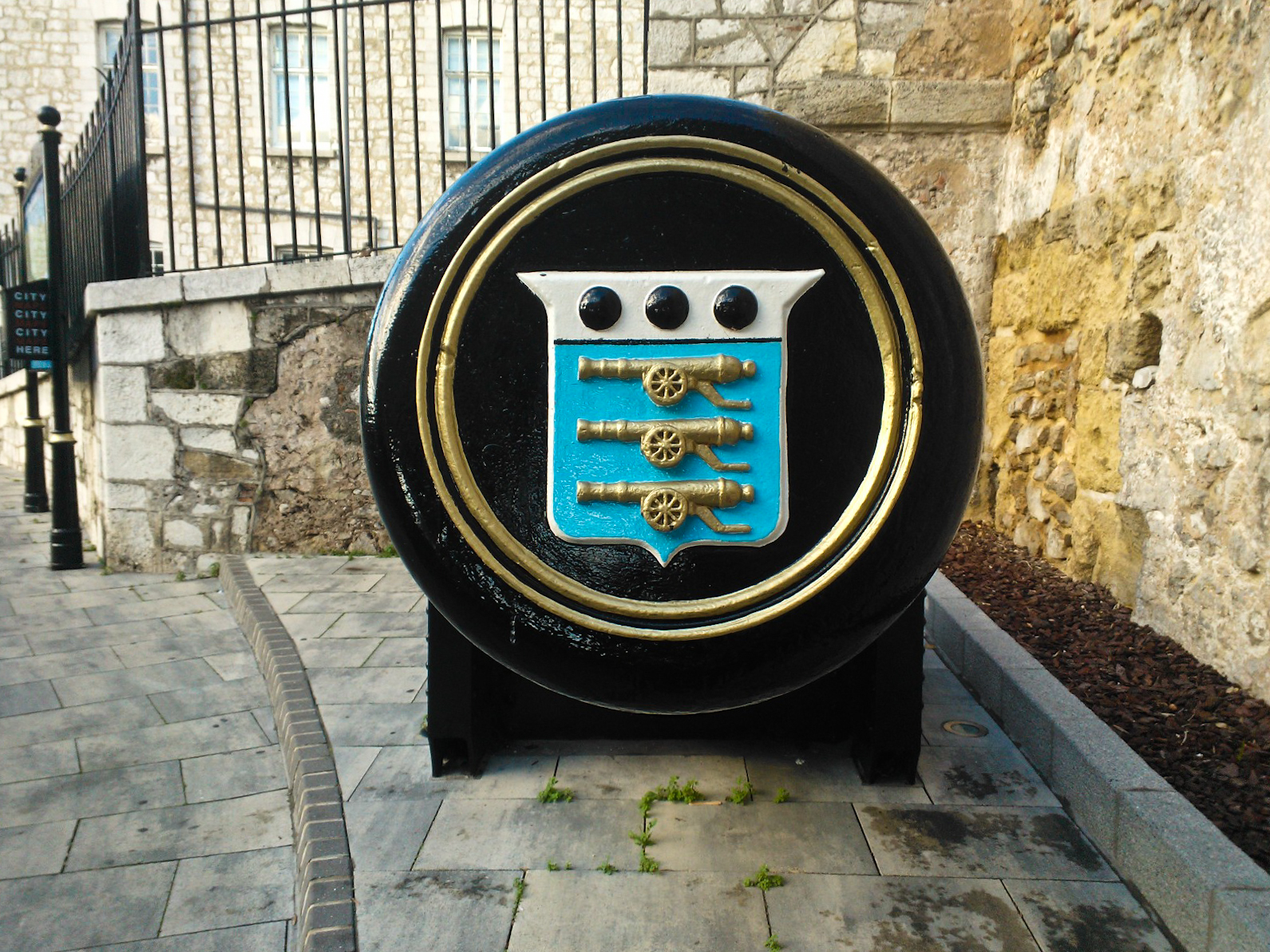
- Board of Ordnance Arms preserved on a gun tampion in Gibraltar
- Member of: Board of Ordnance (1545-1855)
- Reports to: Master-General of the Ordnance
- Appointer: Prime Minister; Subject to formal approval by the Queen-in-Council
- Term length: Not fixed (typically 3–9 years)
- Inaugural holder: Sir Francis Fleming
- Formation: 1545–1855

The Lieutenant-General of the Ordnance was a member of the British Board of Ordnance and the deputy of the Master-General of the Ordnance. The office was established in 1545, and the holder was appointed by the crown under letters patent. It was abolished in 1855 when the Board of Ordnance was subsumed into the War Office.

== List of Lieutenants-General of the Ordnance ==
- (as Lieutenant of the Ordnance) Sir Christopher Morris 1544
- Sir Francis Fleming 1545–1558
- William Bromfield 1558–1563
- Edward Randolph 1563–1566
- Sir William Pelham 1567–1587
- Sir Robert Constable 1588–1591
- George Carew, 1st Baron Carew 1592–1608
- Sir Roger Dallison 1608–1616
- Sir Richard Moryson 1616–1625
- Sir William Harington 1625–1626
- Sir William Heydon 1626–1627
- Sir John Heydon 1627–1642
- John Pym 1642–1643 (Parliamentarian)
- Sir Walter Earle 1644–1648 (Parliamentarian)
- Thomas Harrison 1650–1652 (Parliamentarian)
- William Legge 1660–1670
- David Walter 1670–1679
- George Legge 1679–1682
- Sir Christopher Musgrave 1682–1687
- Henry Tichborne, 3rd Baronet 1687–1689
- Sir Henry Goodricke, 2nd Baronet 1689–1702
- John Granville, 1st Baron Granville 1702–1705
- Thomas Erle 1705–1712
- John Hill 1712–1714
- Thomas Erle 1714–1718
- Thomas Micklethwait 1718
- Sir Charles Wills 1719–1741
- George Wade 1742–1748
- Sir John Ligonier 1748–1757
- Lord George Sackville 1757–1759
- John Manners, Marquess of Granby 1759–1763
- George Townshend, 4th Viscount Townshend 1763–1767
- Henry Seymour Conway 1767–1772
- Jeffrey Amherst, 1st Baron Amherst 1772–1782
- William Howe, 5th Viscount Howe 1782–1804
- Sir Thomas Trigge 1804–1814
- Sir Hildebrand Oakes, 1st Baronet 1814–1822
- William Carr Beresford, 1st Viscount Beresford 1823–1824
- Sir George Murray 1824–1825
- Sir William Henry Clinton 1825–1829
- Lord Edward Somerset 1829–1830
- vacant
- Sir Hew Dalrymple Ross 1854–1855

== Sources ==
- http://www.history.ac.uk/publications/office/ordnance-lieutenant in the United Kingdom
