= Field Dalling =

Village in Norfolk, England

Coordinates: 52.91118°N 0.98345°E

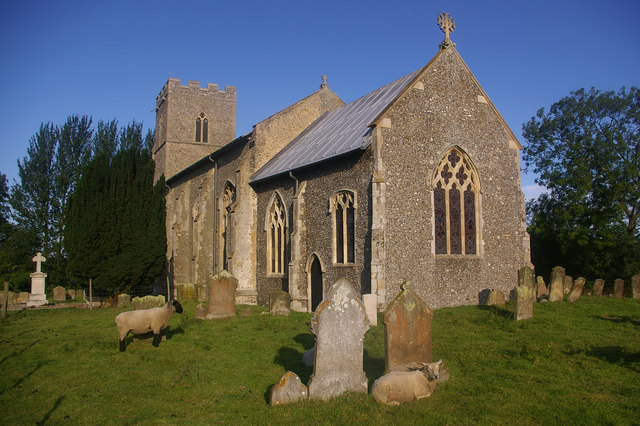
- St. Andrew's Church

- Location within Norfolk
- Area: 4.97 sq mi (12.9 km^{2})
- Population: 299 (2021 census)
  - Density: 60/sq mi (23/km^{2})
- OS grid reference: TG007390
  - London: 107 miles (172 km)
- Civil parish: Field Dalling
- District: North Norfolk
- Shire county: Norfolk
- Region: East
- Country: England
- Sovereign state: United Kingdom
- Post town: HOLT
- Postcode district: NR25
- Dialling code: 01328
- Police: Norfolk
- Fire: Norfolk
- Ambulance: East of England
- UK Parliament: North Norfolk

Field Dalling is a village and civil parish in the English county of Norfolk.

Field Dalling is located 4.5 miles (7.2 km) west of Holt and 23 miles (37 km) north-west of Norwich. The parish of Field Dalling also includes the smaller village of Saxlingham.

== Correct pronunciation ==
"Field Dawling"; "Field Dorlin'"

== History ==
Dalling's name dates to Anglo-Saxon times and derives from the Old English for the settlement of 'Dalla's people'. The prefix 'field' was added to distinguish it from nearby Wood Dalling, 9 miles (14 km) to the north-west.

Two possible sites of Roman settlement have been identified within the parish, with artefacts such as coins, pottery and brooches being unearthed which leads to the conclusion that Field Dalling was the site of Roman industrial activity.

In the Domesday Book of 1086, Field Dalling is listed as a settlement of 38 households in the hundred of Greenhoe. In 1086, the village was divided between the estates of King William I, Alan of Brittany and Roger Bigot.

The Jolly Farmers pub opened in Field Dalling in 1789 and finally closed in 1977, after the death of the last landlord, Charles Cox.

During the Second World War, two spigot mortar emplacements were built in Field Dalling to provide anti-tank weaponry for the Home Guard to resist a potential German invasion of Great Britain.

== Geography ==
According to the 2021 census, Field Dalling with Saxlingham has a population of 299 people which shows an increase from the 285 people recorded in the 2011 census.

== St. Andrew's Church ==
Field Dalling's parish church is dedicated to Saint Andrew. Its tower dates from the fourteenth century and its nave and chancel from the fifteenth century. St Andrew's Church is located within the village on Langham Road and has been Grade I listed since 1959.

The font inside St Andrew's dates from the fifteenth century. The stained glass is largely the work of the Victorian glazier William Warrington, depicting the Good Samaritan, the Parable of the Sower and the Crucifixion.

== Amenities ==
The village has experienced a slow decline over the years; the primary school closed in 1977, the last pub in the village closed in 1986, and the post office and shop had closed down by the end of the 1990s. Apart from the church, the playground/recreation area and the village hall are the only amenities left in Field Dalling today. However, on occasions the village hall has hosted 'pub nights'. In the past there were amenities such as a bigger playing field, a football team, and a reading room.

Currently new houses for rent are being built just off the Holt Road as part of a Victory Housing Trust scheme.

== Governance ==
Field Dalling is part of the electoral ward of Priory for local elections and is part of the district of North Norfolk.

The village's national constituency is North Norfolk, which has been represented by the Liberal Democrat Steff Aquarone MP since 2024.

== War Memorial ==
Field Dalling's war memorial is a bronze plaque, with a wooden backing located inside St Andrew's Church. The memorial lists the following names for the First World War:

Rank	Name	Unit	Date of death	Burial/Commemoration
2Lt.	Roger Chaworth-Musters	No. 56 Squadron RFC	7 May 1917	Arras Flying Memorial
St1C	Richard Bridgwater	HMS Vanguard	9 Jul. 1917	Chatham Naval Memorial
LCpl.	William C. Bilham	11th Bn., Suffolk Regiment	28 Apr. 1917	Browns Copse Cemetery
Pte.	Ernest W. Doughty	6th Bn., Essex Regiment	25 Feb. 1919	St. Andrew's Churchyard
Pte.	Herbert Cooke	10th Bn., Essex Regt.	9 Mar. 1917	Dernancourt Cemetery
Pte.	Herbert G. Doughty	10th Bn., Essex Regt.	13 Apr. 1918	St. Pierre Cemetery
Pte.	Thomas S. Lucas	1st Bn., Leicestershire Regiment	5 Apr. 1918	Südfriedhof
Pte.	Ernest R. Knights	1st Bn., Norfolk Regiment	28 Jun. 1918	Aire Communal Cemetery

There is no memorial for the fallen of the Second World War but the following men are known to have died in the conflict and were from Field Dalling:

Rank	Name	Unit	Date of death	Burial/Commemoration
LAC	Raymond H. Harcourt	Royal Air Force Volunteer Reserve	8 Nov. 1944	Kranji War Memorial
Gnr.	Wilfred H. Blazier	164 (HAA) Regt., Royal Artillery	21 Aug. 1943	St. Andrew's Churchyard
Pte.	George T. Hall	5th Bn., Royal Norfolk Regiment	15 Nov. 1943	Kanchanaburi Cemetery
