= Christopher Heydon =

English politician and astrologer (1561–1623)

Sir Christopher Heydon

Member of the England Parliament for Norfolk
- In office 1588–1589

Personal details
- Born: 14 August 1561 Surrey, England
- Died: 1 January 1623 (aged 61)
- Education: Peterhouse, Cambridge

Sir Christopher Heydon (14 August 1561 – 1 January 1623) was an English soldier, politician, and writer on astrology, who was a Member of Parliament for Norfolk from 1588 to 1589. He quarrelled with his family over its estates in Norfolk.

== Background ==
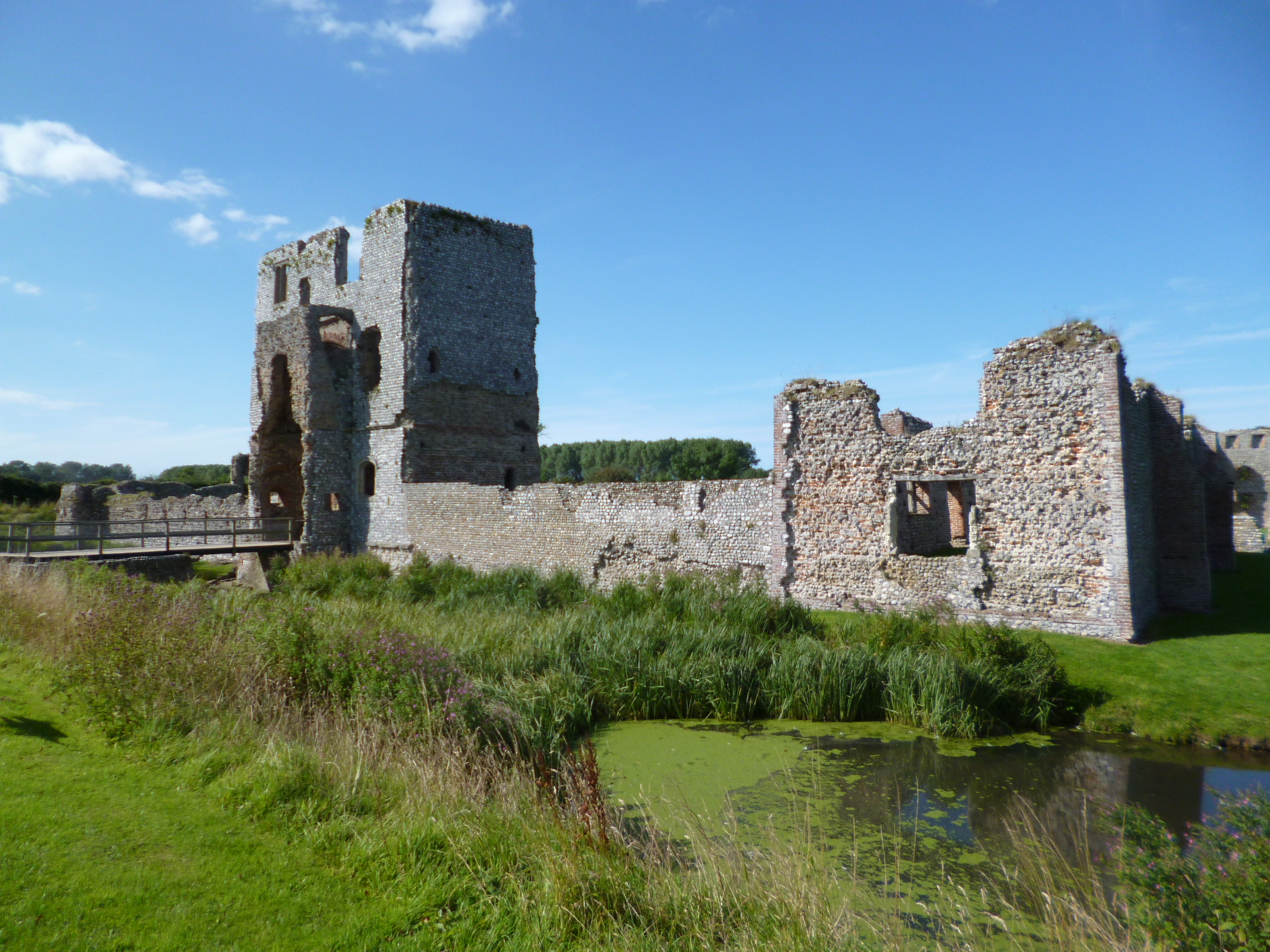
The Heydon family owned Baconsthorpe Castle in Norfolk

Born in Surrey, Heydon was the eldest son of Sir William Heydon (1540–1594) of Baconsthorpe, Norfolk, and his wife Anne, daughter of Sir William Woodhouse of Hickling, Norfolk. The family was powerful in Norfolk affairs, owning many manors and living at Baconsthorpe Castle, a large country house in North Norfolk.

== Education ==
Heydon was educated at Gresham's School, Holt and Peterhouse, Cambridge, where he knew the young Robert Devereux, 2nd Earl of Essex, and after graduating BA in 1579 travelled widely on the continent.

== Dispute with his father ==
Deeply in debt, Heydon's father Sir William had mortgaged Baconsthorpe and was in need of the Queen's protection from his creditors. In 1590, he tried to sell much of his land, but his son challenged him, as the estates were entailed on him. Sir William then threatened to demolish Baconsthorpe Castle, but his son got an Order from the Privy Council, which condemned the plan as unnatural.

The dispute dragged on for years, and when Sir William died in 1594, he left his estate to his widow, but Heydon then went to law against her. Lady Heydon appealed to Queen Elizabeth, and the dispute was settled on her orders by the Lord Keeper. Heydon was left with inherited debts of £11,000, as well as his own of over £3,000 – huge sums in the 16th century.

== Career ==
In 1586, while he was still a young man, Heydon stood for the Norfolk county constituency of the Parliament of England. Although defeated, the Privy Council of England ordered a fresh poll, which Heydon won. The House of Commons challenged the council's constitutional right to interfere in elections, and the second election was quashed. Heydon stood again for parliament in 1588, again successfully.

He served as a Justice of the Peace from 1586 and was a commissioner for musters in the 1590s.

He joined the Earl of Essex and took part in his capture of Cádiz in 1596, where he was knighted.

In October 1600 Heydon challenged Sir John Townshend to a duel, but it was forbidden by the Privy Council.

After his father's death, Heydon mortgaged Baconsthorpe, and with his brother John he took part in the Essex revolt of 1601, leading rebel troops through Ludgate, which marked the end of his public life. Heydon went into hiding and wrote to Sir Robert Cecil, offering to pay a fine. Cecil worked to get him a pardon. Heydon was held in the Fleet Prison, but was pardoned for £2,000. His finances were very low, and in 1614 he was forced to mortgage the rest of his estates.

== Writer on astrology ==
Heydon was famous as a champion of astrology. His best-known work was A Defence of Judiciall Astrologie (1603), the most substantial English defence of astrology of its day, rebutting John Chamber's A Treatise Against Judiciall Astrologie (1601), which had called for parliament to outlaw astrology. Heydon argued that it was a valid science, compatible with Christianity. He drew upon Tycho Brahe and others.

In writing A Defence of Judiciall Astrologie, Heydon had the help of the Reverend William Bredon, who was both a clergyman and an astrologer and was at the time Heydon's chaplain. William Lilly says whimsically of him: "William Bredon... had a hand in composing Sir Christopher Heydon's Defence of Judicial Astrology, being that time his chaplain he was so given over to tobacco and drink, that when he had no tobacco, he would cut the bell-ropes and smoke them."

Heydon also wrote but did not publish An Astrological Discourse with Mathematical Demonstrations (c. 1608), a further defence of astrology drawing on Kepler, with a short account of the 1603 conjunction of Saturn and Jupiter. The manuscript passed to the astrologer Nicholas Fiske, whose attempts to publish it failed, but it appeared in an edited form in 1650, subsidised by Elias Ashmole, with a preface by William Lilly.

Heydon's work was given weight by his social standing and the lack of challenges to it. No reply by Chamber appeared, and George Carleton's The Madnesse of Astrologers (1624) was published only twenty years later.

Heydon also made elaborate predictions for 1608 and 1609, which remained unpublished.

=== Bibliography ===
- A Defence of Judiciall Astrologie by Christopher Heydon (1603)
- An astrological discourse with mathematical demonstrations, proving the powerful and harmonical influence of the planets and fixed stars upon elementary bodies, in justification of the validity of astrology. Together with an astrological judgment upon the great conjunction of Saturn & Jupiter 1603, Written by that worthy learned gentleman Sir Christopher Heydon, Knight, and now published by Nicholas Fiske, Jatromathematicus [c. 1608, first published 1650]
- Astrology: The wisdom of Solomon in miniature, being a new doctrine of nativities... or, the art of determining future events by Christopher Heydon
- The new astrology, or, The art of predicting or foretelling future events by the aspects, positions, and influence of the heavenly bodies: founded on scripture, experience, and reason... in two parts by Christopher Heydon

== Predictions ==
Heydon's predictions on European politics were strongly Protestant. He foresaw that Spain would lose the Indies and predicted that the Austrian Habsburgs would fall in 1623 and Rome in 1646: this would lead to the ruin of the Ottomans and the rise of Christ's kingdom, "the fifth Monarchie of the World", in about 1682.

He remained a champion of militant Protestantism to the end.

== Astronomer ==
He had many astronomical interests and was a close friend of the mathematician Henry Briggs and the astronomer John Bainbridge, lending them instruments, sending them astronomical papers, and inviting them to stay at Baconsthorpe. He wrote a treatise on the comet of 1618 and described his own astronomical observations with instruments made by his friend Edward Wright.

== Family ==
Heydon married, first, Mirabel, daughter of the London alderman Sir Thomas Rivet, but she died at the age of twenty-two. Heydon built her a large and ornate tomb at Saxlingham, covered with hieroglyphs which he explained in a treatise now lost. The second son of this marriage was Sir John Heydon, a royalist ordnance officer. He married secondly Anne, daughter of John Dodge and widow of John Potts of Mannington, Norfolk, in or before 1599. She died in 1642.

== Sources ==
- Carleton, George, Astrogomanych : The madnesse of astrologers! : with an examination of Sir Christopher Heydons book, intitvled A defence of judiciall astrologie [1624]
- Saunders, Richard, Apollo Anglicanus, the English Apollo: assisting all persons in the right understanding of this years revolution, as also of things past, present, and to come. With necessary tables plain and useful. A twofold kalendar, viz. Julian or English, Gregorian or foreign computations, more plain and full than any other, ... Being the third after bissextile or leap-year. To which is added short notes upon every day throughout the year, shewing (in a general way) good and bad days therein; also a modest vindication of the art of astrology, and a justification of the practise thereof, contracted into the tops of the twelve right-hand pages of the kalendar, from Sir Christopher Heydon's Defence by Richard Saunders, Student in the physical-coelestial sciences
