= John Heydon (soldier) =

The Right Honourable Sir John Heydon
- Died: 16 October 1653
- Military career
- Allegiance: Royalist
- Rank: Lieutenant-General of the Ordnance
- Conflicts: First English Civil War
- Other work: Mathematician

Sir John Heydon (died 1653) was an English Royalist military commander and mathematician, Lieutenant-General of the Ordnance at the outbreak of the First English Civil War.

== Life ==
The second son of Sir Christopher Heydon, in 1613 he was keeper of the stores in Sandown Castle, Deal, Kent. He was knighted in August 1620. In 1627 he was appointed lieutenant of the ordnance in the place of his brother Sir William, who was killed in the expedition to the Isle of Rhé.

Between 1627 and 1643 Heydon was actively occupied in furnishing men, provisions, arms, guns, and ammunition for the service of the king. When Charles I raised his standard at Nottingham on 22 August 1642, Heydon was in charge of cannon and ammunition at York. He soon joined the king, and accompanied the Royalist army from Shrewsbury towards London in October 1642. He acted as Lieutenant-General of the Ordnance with Charles's forces, and joined his Privy Council. He was made D.C.L. at Oxford on 20 December 1642.

Heydon suffered for his support of the king, having his goods sequestrated. He died on 16 October 1653.

Although it is important to distinguish Sir John from the astrologer John Heydon (1629-c. 1670), Lieutenant-General Heydon is also found to have developed alchemical theory and investigative practice.

== Notes ==
Attribution

This article incorporates text from a publication now in the public domain: Stephen, Leslie; Lee, Sidney, eds. (1891). "Heydon, John (d.1653)". Dictionary of National Biography. Vol. 26. London: Smith, Elder & Co.
