= Abbey of the Minoresses of St. Clare without Aldgate =

Former convent in London, England

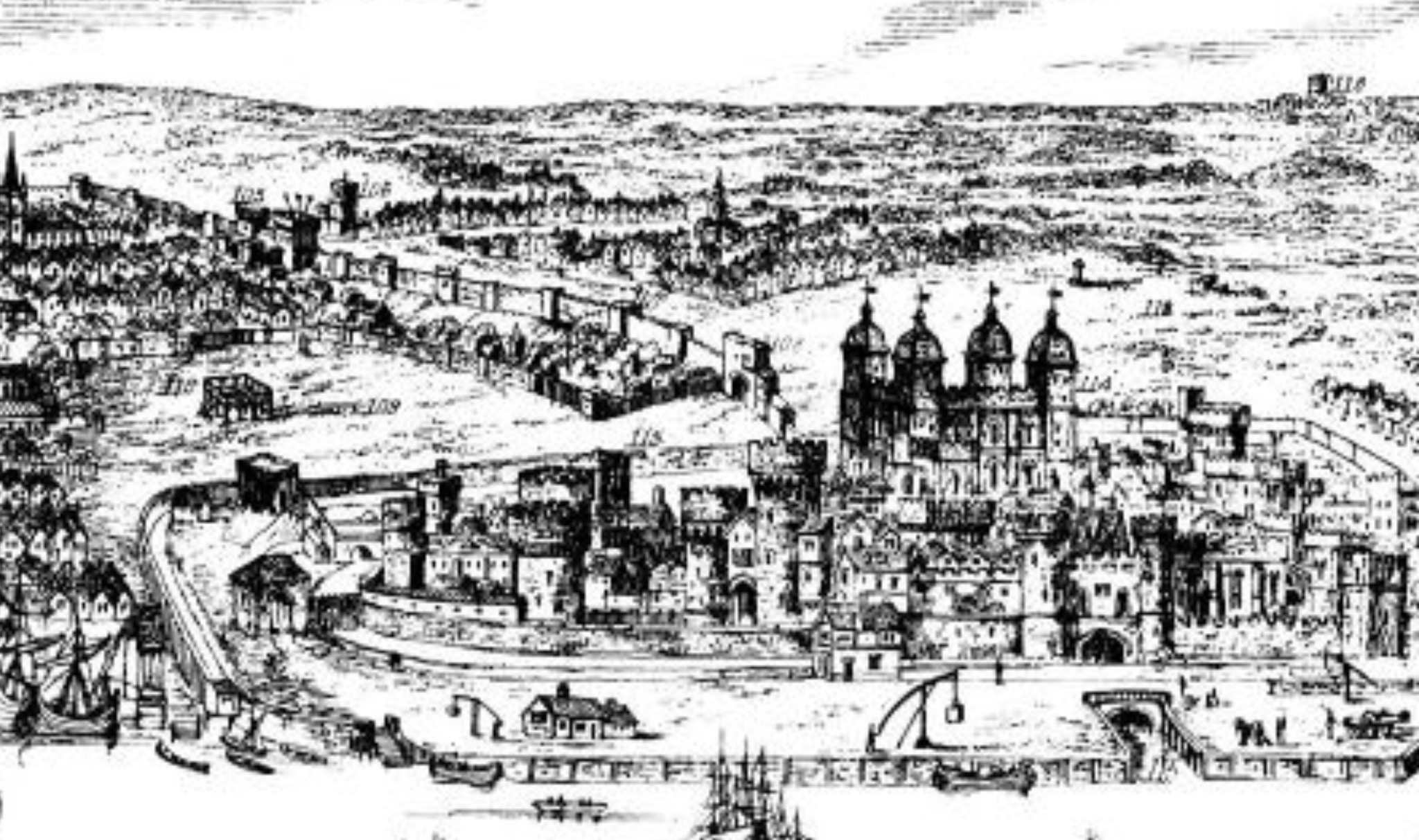
1849 engraving of London, Westminster and Southwark in 1543. In this detail the Minories can be seen just above and to the left of the White Tower/Tower of London. Note the close proximity of the scaffold on Tower Hill, shown to the left of the Minories.

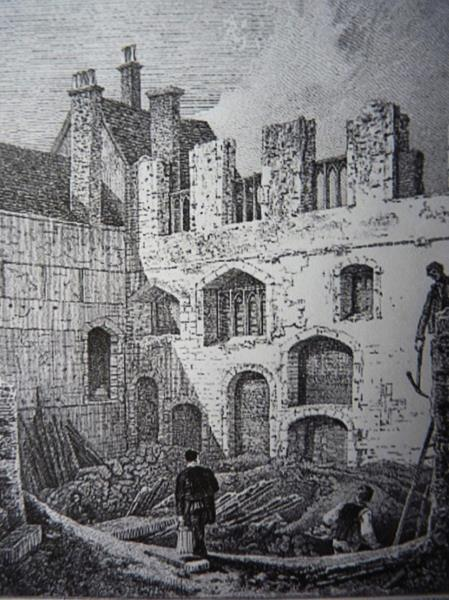
Ruins of the abbey of the Minoress of St Clare of Aldgate, London 1796

The Abbey of the Minoresses of St. Clare without Aldgate (Note: Also known variously as the Abbey of the Blessed Virgin Mary, Aldgate, the House of Minoresses of the Order of St Clare of the Grace of the Blessed Virgin Mary, the Minoresses without Aldgate, St Clare outside Aldgate and the Minories, London.) was a monastery of Franciscan women living an enclosed life, established in the late 13th century on a site often said to be of five acres, though it may have been as little as half that, at the spot in the parish of St. Botolph, outside the medieval walls of the City of London at Aldgate that later, by a corruption of the term minoresses, became known as The Minories, a placename found also in other English towns including Birmingham, Colchester, Newcastle upon Tyne and Stratford-upon-Avon.

== Franciscan women ==
As some varieties of the monastery's formal name make clear, the women of this abbey were members of the Order of St Clare, otherwise known as Clarisses, or more usually in English as Poor Clares. This was and is the female branch of the Order of St Francis or Order of Friars Minor known as Franciscans. In the structures typical of the mendicant orders, they were professed nuns of the Franciscan Second Order. As an expression of humility, the male Franciscans had adopted for themselves the Latin term fratres minores ("lesser brothers"), rendered in English as "friars minor" or just "minors". In a similar way, the Poor Clares were known in Latin as sorores minores ("lesser sisters") and in medieval England as "minoresses".

== Foundation ==
The Aldgate house was founded at least by 1291, when it is mentioned in the Taxatio Ecclesiastica, compiled in 1291–1292 at the behest of Pope Nicholas IV preparatory to papal taxation to finance a crusade to the Holy Land. Some think that there was perhaps a community operating on the site as early as 1281. The title of "founder" was later consistently attributed to Edmund Crouchback, Earl of Leicester and Earl of Lancaster, a son of Henry III of England and brother of King Edward I. The new monastery was to house a group of enclosed Poor Clares.

The members of the convent were brought to England by Edmund's second wife, Blanche of Artois, who was the widow of Henry le Gros, King of Navarre, and regent of the Kingdom of Navarre during the minority of their daughter, Joan I. The high rank of the founder (and foundress) meant that the foundation was effected with a rapidity that contrasted with other minoresses houses in England.

== A mild rule ==
Though established only relatively recently (1212), the Poor Clares already had a mitigated form of their Rule, approved by Pope Urban IV, which allowed the Order to own property, as opposed to the restrictions originally laid down by the foundress, Clare of Assisi. The precise calibrated formulation of these matters is referred to as the Isabella Rule, after the sister of Louis IX of France (St Louis), St Isabella. Though never a nun, she had in 1256 founded the Poor Clares' Abbey of Longchamp in part of the Forest of Rouvray (now the Bois de Boulogne), west of Paris.

Some indication of the degree of mitigation of St Clare's early severity can perhaps be seen from an example taken from a century after the Abbey's foundation. Thomas of Woodstock, Duke of Gloucester, youngest child of King Edward III, and his wife Eleanor de Bohun placed their youngest surviving daughter Isabel (1386–1402) in the Abbey. It speaks volumes for the degree of austerity in the house that by the widowed Eleanor's 1399 will, the daughter received a bed of cloth of gold, precious books and 40 pounds. Eleanor was to die in the house and her daughter Isabel was to become the abbess.

It so happened that Queen Blanche, wife to the Abbey's founder Edmund Crouchback, was a niece of King Louis and his sister Isabella, the latter being the foundress of the Poor Clares' Abbey of Longchamp, heavily involved in the drawing up of the mitigated Rule named after her. Both Louis and Isabella would later be regarded as saints.

== The nuns arrive ==
Though some secondary literature speak of the nuns brought to launch the new English Abbey being of Spanish origin, in all probability they came from France, and more exactly from Longchamp, founded by Blanche's aunt, Isabella. We know that around 1293-1294 another house of Minoresses founded in England at Waterbeach in Cambridgeshire was populated by a group from Longchamp under the command of a former Abbess of Longchamp, Jeanne of Nevers. Moreover, the Rule prescribed for the Aldgate nuns by Pope Boniface VIII was that of Longchamp. That the Isabella Rule was in fact implemented at Aldate can be seen from a 15th-century English-language manuscript once belonging to the Abbey, and whose text represents the Isabella Rule. As to the choice of women Franciscans for both Longchamp and Aldgate, an indication of the impetus of the Franciscan movement can be gained from the fact that in France alone, between 1220 and 1534 some 328 male Franciscan houses were founded.

== Endowment and benefactions ==
The founder, Earl Edmund, provided an initial endowment consisting of lands and tenements in the London suburbs and later in Derbyshire. Another early benefactor was Sir Henry le Galeys, Mayor of London in 1273 and 1281–1283. He died in 1302, having who endowed a chantry in the chapel of St Mary built by him in the nuns' church, and where he was buried.

Notwithstanding this income and also important privileges and exemptions that were bestowed from an early date on the house by King Edward II and Pope Boniface VIII, the nuns' income seems to have been modest to poor. In 1290 we find a reference to the poor state of the buildings, and in the 14th century the nuns were repeatedly let off both ecclesiastical and civil taxes on the grounds of their poverty. Nevertheless, in that same century there came a series of substantial benefactions from influential figures, such as Queen Isabella, widow of Edward II, Margaret, Countess of Norfolk and John of Gaunt, Duke of Lancaster.

== Connections ==
The heavy royal connections of the abbey's beginnings appear to have imparted from the outset a certain cachet to the house and in particular in the early days women aspiring to become professed nuns had to be of noble birth, though by the 14th century the daughters of wealthy merchants were also entering. The presence of the noble and the rich within the abbey's walls was not confined to nuns. After the death of her husband, Thomas de Beauchamp, 12th Earl of Warwick, in 1401, Margaret Beauchamp née Ferrers, was given an indult from the pope to reside in the Abbey with three matrons as long as she wished, though presumably not as a nun. More surprisingly still, Thomas of Woodstock, Duke of Gloucester, whom we have already seen placing his young daughter Isabel in the Abbey, had a house right next to the conventual church and was allowed to have a private entrance made through.

In April 1502 the Abbess sent a gift of distilled water of roses to the Tower of London for Elizabeth of York, the wife of Henry VII. The Queen gave a gift of money to three nuns and a servant of the Abbess.

== Disasters ==
Like the general population, the Abbey must have suffered more than once from the plague and other epidemics. In 1514 the Bubonic Plague reappeared in London and was severe enough to drive Henry VIII and Erasmus well away from the city, and a new outbreak came the following year by April. It is said that some twenty-seven of the abbey's nuns died of the plague in 1515.

It must have been shortly after the outbreak of plague that the convent buildings were destroyed by fire. In addition to the benefactions of private individuals, the mayor, aldermen, and citizens of London made a contributions of 200 marks, but at the special request of Cardinal Wolsey to the Court of Common Council, it was decided in 1520 to give 100 marks more to complete the building. It is ironic that Henry VIII also gave £200 at this time, which did not impede his closing and despoiling the house less than two decades later.

== Abbesses ==
The following list is incomplete. Furthermore, to judge by the more abundant data available from the mother house, the Abbey of Longchamp, it is possible that a nun could serve more than one term of office as abbess, even at a distance of several years.

- Margaret (1294)
- Juliana (1301)
- Alice de Sherstede (1313)
- Katharine de Ingham (1355)
- Isabella de Lisle (1397)
- Eleanor Scrope, (died 1398)
- Margaret Helmystede (1400)
- Isabella of Gloucester (1421–1422)
- Margaret (1441)
- Joan Barton (1479–1480)
- Alice FitzLewes (1501)
- Dorothy Cumberford (1524, 1526, and 1529)
- Elizabeth Salvage, who in 1539 had to surrender the house.

== Seal ==
The seal of the Abbey in 1371 depicted the Virgin Mary standing holding the Christ Child, which is not a particularly common motif in medieval English nunneries. At other periods the favoured image on the Abbey's seals seems to have been the Coronation of the Virgin.

== Dissolution ==
According to the Valor Ecclesiasticus of 1535, the abbey's income amounted to £342, 5 shillings 10½ pence gross, and £318, 8 shillings 5 pence net, while its possessions included several rents in and around London, manors and lands on the Isle of Wight, Berkshire and Hertfordshire.

The abbey was surrendered in March 1539, and the terms granted to the nuns were similar to those given in other nunneries. The abbess, Dame Elizabeth Salvage, received a life pension of £40 a year, four nuns received life pensions of £3, 3 shillings 8 pence each, ten nuns received £2 13 shillings 4 pence, nine nuns £2, and a novice £1, 6 shillings 8 pence. No provision appears to have been made for the six lay sisters.

== Fate of the buildings ==
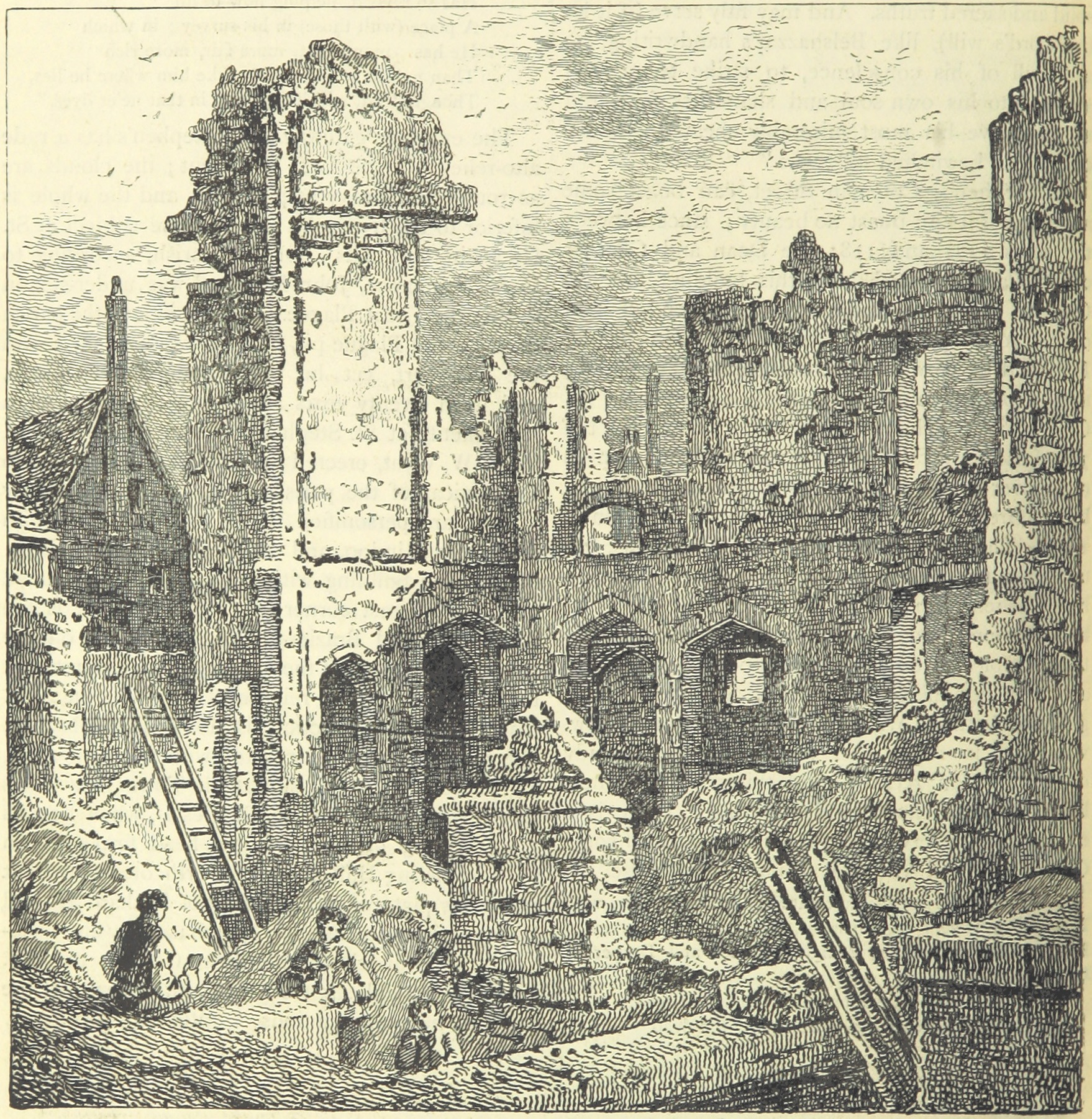
Ruins of the convent of St. Clare. From a view published by J. T. Smith, 1797.

Following the Dissolution, the abbey is said to have served for a time as the residence of John Clerk, Bishop of Bath and Wells, a veteran diplomat of Henry VIII; the King seizing the Bishop's own London residence in compensation. It also came to house officers of the Tower of London. In 1552, under Edward VI, it was given to Henry Grey, Duke of Suffolk, the father of Lady Jane Grey. In 1554 it reverted to government use, housing the Ordnance Office and its stores, transferred there from the Tower of London. Some of the abbey buildings survived until their destruction by fire in 1797.

In 1964 the coffin of Anne de Mowbray, 8th Countess of Norfolk, who died aged eight, was unearthed by chance at the abbey site, and later reburied in Westminster Abbey.

== Some reading ==
- David Aers (ed.), Medieval Literature and Historical Inquiry: Essays in Honor of Derek Pearsall, D.S. Brewer, Woodbridge, 2000.
- Anne F.C. Bourdillon, The Order of Minoresses in England, Manchester University Press, Manchester, 1922 (= British Society of Franciscan Studies 12).
- Henry Fly, Some account of an abbey of nuns formerly situated in the street now called the Minories in the County of Middlesex, and Liberty of the Tower of London, in Archaeologia 15 (1806) 92–113.
- Friaries: The minoresses without Aldgate, in William Page (ed.), A History of the County of London: Volume 1, London, 1909, pp. 516–519.
- Eileen Power, English Medieval Nunneries, c. 1275-1525, Cambridge University Press, Cambridge, 1922.
- W.W. Seton (ed.), The Rewle of Sustris Menouresses enclosid, Oxford University Press, London, 1914 (= Early English Text Society OS 148).
- Edward Murray Tomlinson, A History of the Minories, London, Smith, London, 1907.
- Jennifer Ward, English Noblewomen in the Later Middle Ages, Routledge, Abingdon, 2014.
