= Edward Randolph (soldier) =

- Died: 12 November 1566
- Allegiance: United Kingdom

Edward Randolph (died 1566), was an English soldier.

Randolph was probably a brother of Thomas Randolph (1523–1590), was born at Badlesmere in Kent. He made himself sufficiently prominent in Edward VI's time to find it necessary to flee to Paris on the accession of Mary I. But, like other rebels, he soon tired of exile, and his known value as a soldier rendered the negotiations for his pardon easy. Wotton wrote to Petre on 17 April 1554, recommending him to mercy; but Mary wrote in May that, though he was forgiven, he must stay and supply information as to the movements of his friends. The formal grant of pardon is dated 9 October 1554. He soon found favour, and on 3 April 1555 Philip wrote to his treasurer, Dominico d'Orbea, ordering a pension of two hundred crowns to be paid to Randolph, who is described as colonel of infantry.

Under Elizabeth I he was at first employed in Scotland. On 1 April 1560 Grey, writing to Norfolk, alluded to 'good Mr. Randall's stout and valiant endeavour;’ and Cecil, writing from Edinburgh on 26 June, speaks of his worth. As a reward he was offered the post of marshal of Berwick, but refused it. In 1563 he was made marshal of Havre (then called in England Newhaven), and aided the French Huguenots with two hundred men. In July 1563 he was ill of the plague. Elizabeth, on Randolph's return to England, made him Lieutenant-General of the Ordnance, and colonel of footmen in Ireland. There he soon had plenty of fighting, and was killed in a battle with O'Neil at Knockfergus on 12 November 1566. A poetical epitaph is in Egerton MS. 2642, f. 198. [Prerogative Will of Canterbury 26 July 1666 and proved 28 January 1567.

Military offices
| Preceded by William Bromfield | Lieutenant General of the Ordnance; 1563–1566 | Succeeded by Sir William Pelham |
