= Waterbeach Abbey =

Monastery in Waterbeach, Cambridgeshire, England

Coordinates: 52.2622°N 0.1947°E

Waterbeach Abbey was an abbey at Waterbeach in Cambridgeshire, England. It was established in 1294 by nuns from the Second Order of St. Francis who had come from Longchamp Abbey in France, which also at least inspired the Abbey of the Minoresses of St. Clare without Aldgate. By 1351, the flood-prone abbey had become disused, the nuns having moved to the nearby Denny Abbey. The site is a scheduled monument.
