= Francis Fleming (MP) =

16th-century English politician

Francis Fleming (by 1502 – 1558) was an English politician.

He was a member (MP) of the parliament of England for Lyme Regis in 1547 and Southampton in March 1553.
