= Minories =

Street in the City of London

Coordinates: 51°30′39″N 0°04′30″W

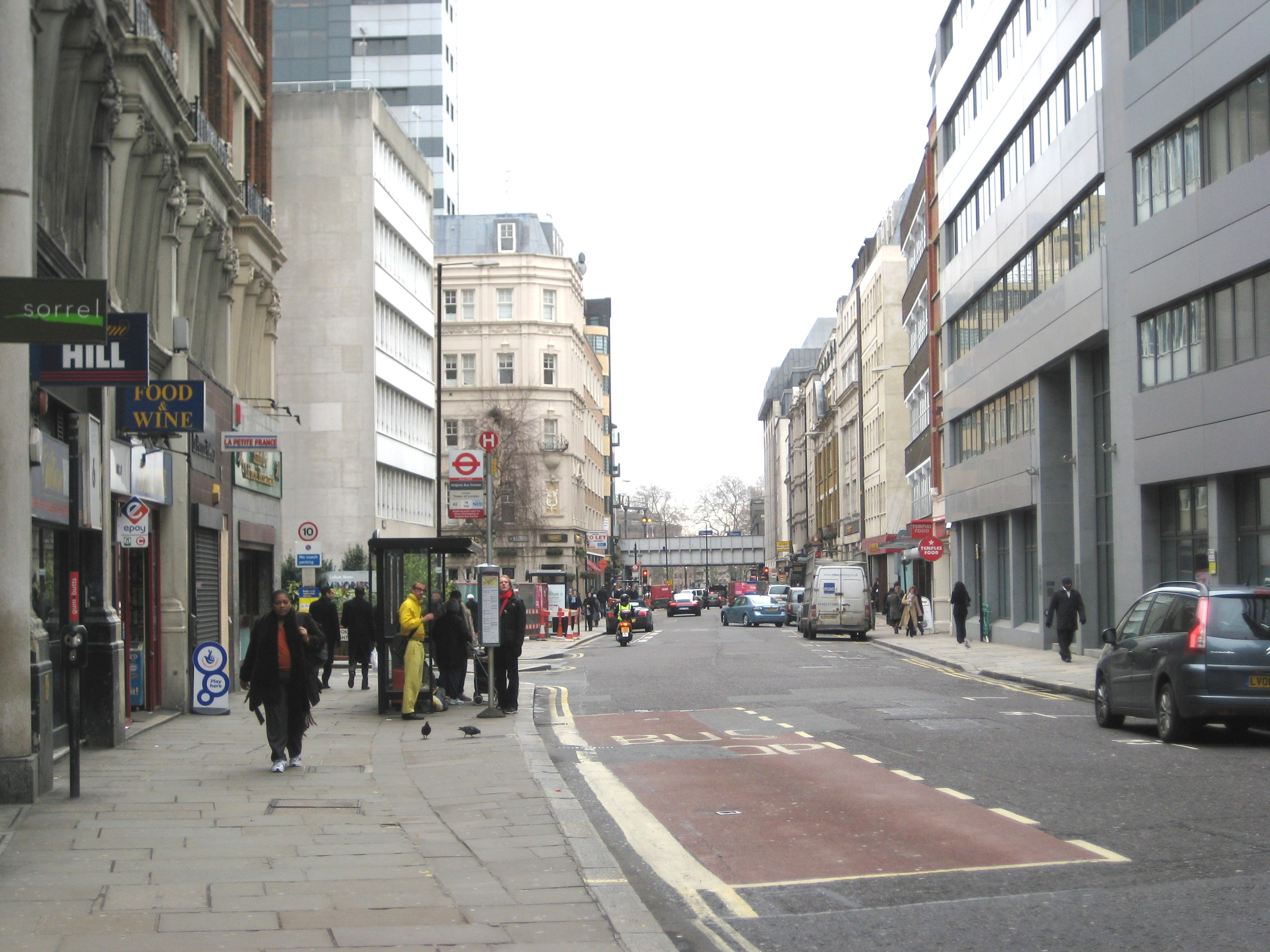
Minories, the street in 2010.

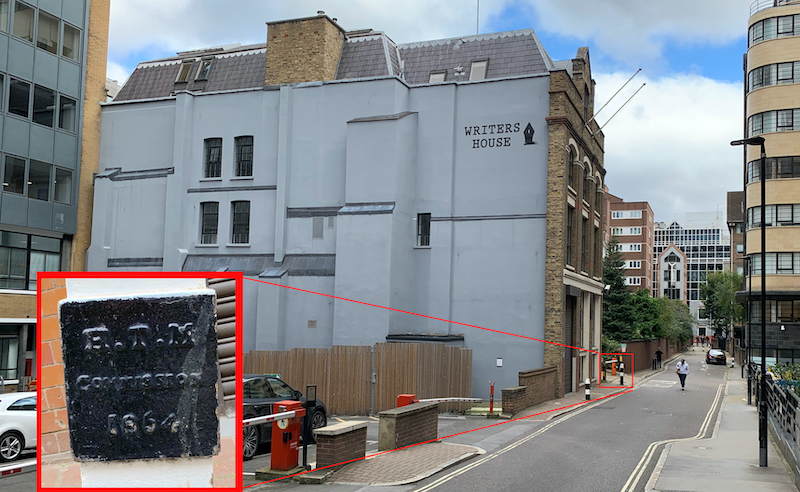
Holy Trinity Minories parish boundary marker

Minories (/ˈmɪnəriːz/ MIN-ə-reez) is the name of a small former administrative unit, and also of a street in the Aldgate area of the City of London. Both the street and the former administrative area take their name from the Abbey of the Minoresses of St. Clare without Aldgate.

Both are positioned just to the east of, and outside, the line of London's former defensive walls, in London's East End. The area of the former administrative unit was outside the City of London (most recently in the London Borough of Tower Hamlets), with the street partially in the city and partly in Tower Hamlets. Boundary changes in 1994 mean the area of both is now wholly within the City of London.

== Toponymy ==
Minories' name is derived from the former Abbey of the Minoresses of St. Clare without Aldgate, founded in 1294. The minoresses were nuns, the name being an anglicisation of the Latin sorores minores ("little sisters"), a name they took out of humility.

The Abbey was also known as the Abbey of St Clare, and by a variety of other variations. (Note: Also known variously as the Abbey of the Blessed Virgin Mary, Aldgate, the House of Minoresses of the Order of St Clare of the Grace of the Blessed Virgin Mary, the Minoresses without Aldgate, St Clare outside Aldgate and the Minories, London.) The Abbey was a house of the Order of St Clare of Assisi founded by St Clare, one of the first followers of St Francis of Assisi. The order was and is the female branch of the Order of St Francis or Order of Friars Minor known as Franciscans.

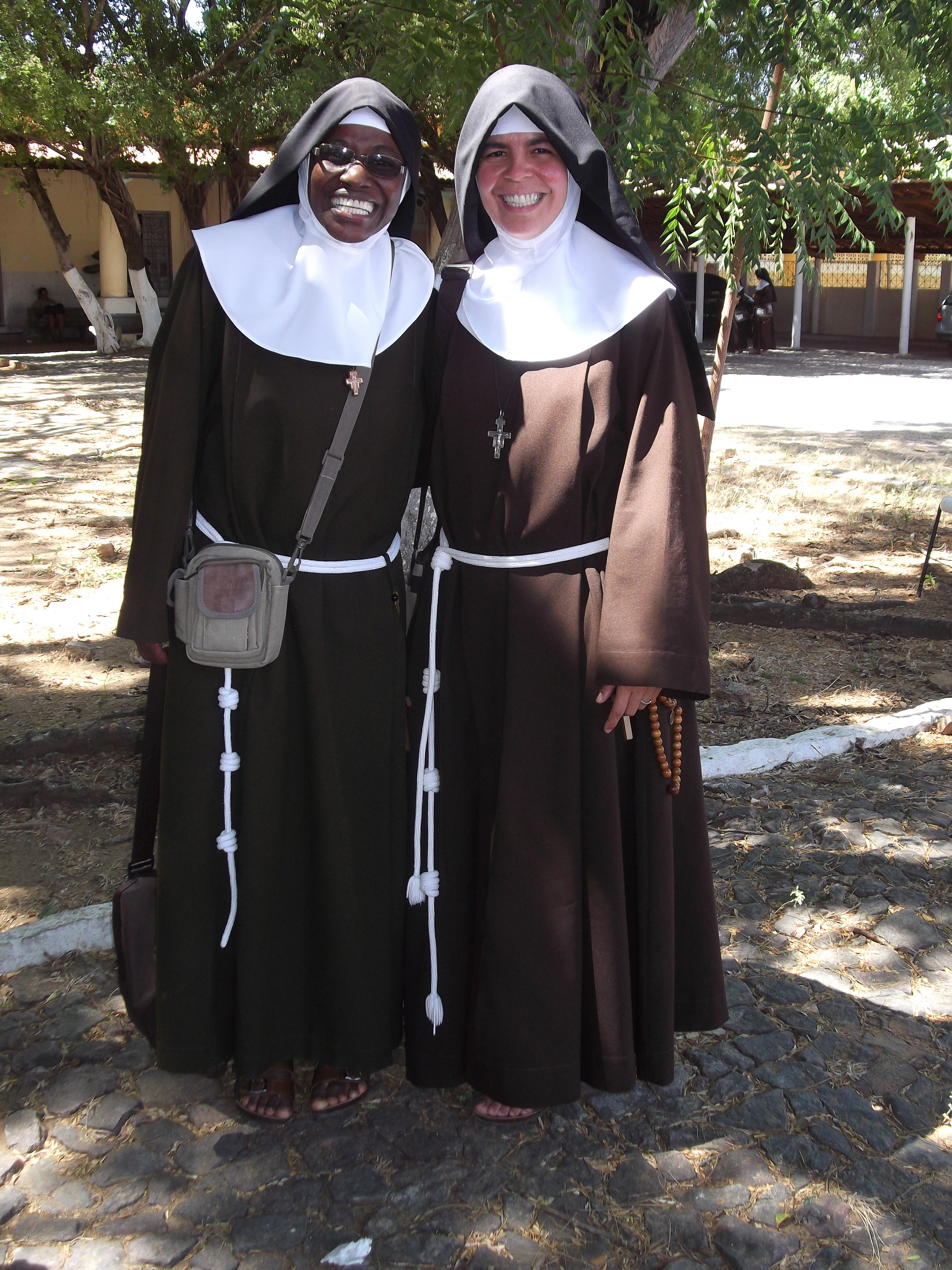
Modern Minoresses at the Immaculate Conception Monastery, Feira de Santana, Brazil

As an expression of humility, the male Franciscans had adopted for themselves the Latin term fratres minores ("lesser or little brothers"), rendered in English as "friars minor" or just "minors". In a similar way, the female Franciscans were known in Latin as sorores minores ("lesser or little sisters"), anglicised to "minoresses".

Members of the order were also known as Poor Clares or Clarisses, and the name St. Clare Street, just off the Minories reflects that. The name Minories can be found in other English towns, including Birmingham, Colchester, Newcastle upon Tyne and Stratford-upon-Avon.

London around 1300: The Abbey of the Minoresses of St. Clare without Aldgate (or Abbey of St. Clare) is shown, sited on the road now known as Minories, which runs from Aldgate to Tower Hill. The road is immediately outside London's Wall and its defensive ditch.

== Governance and history ==
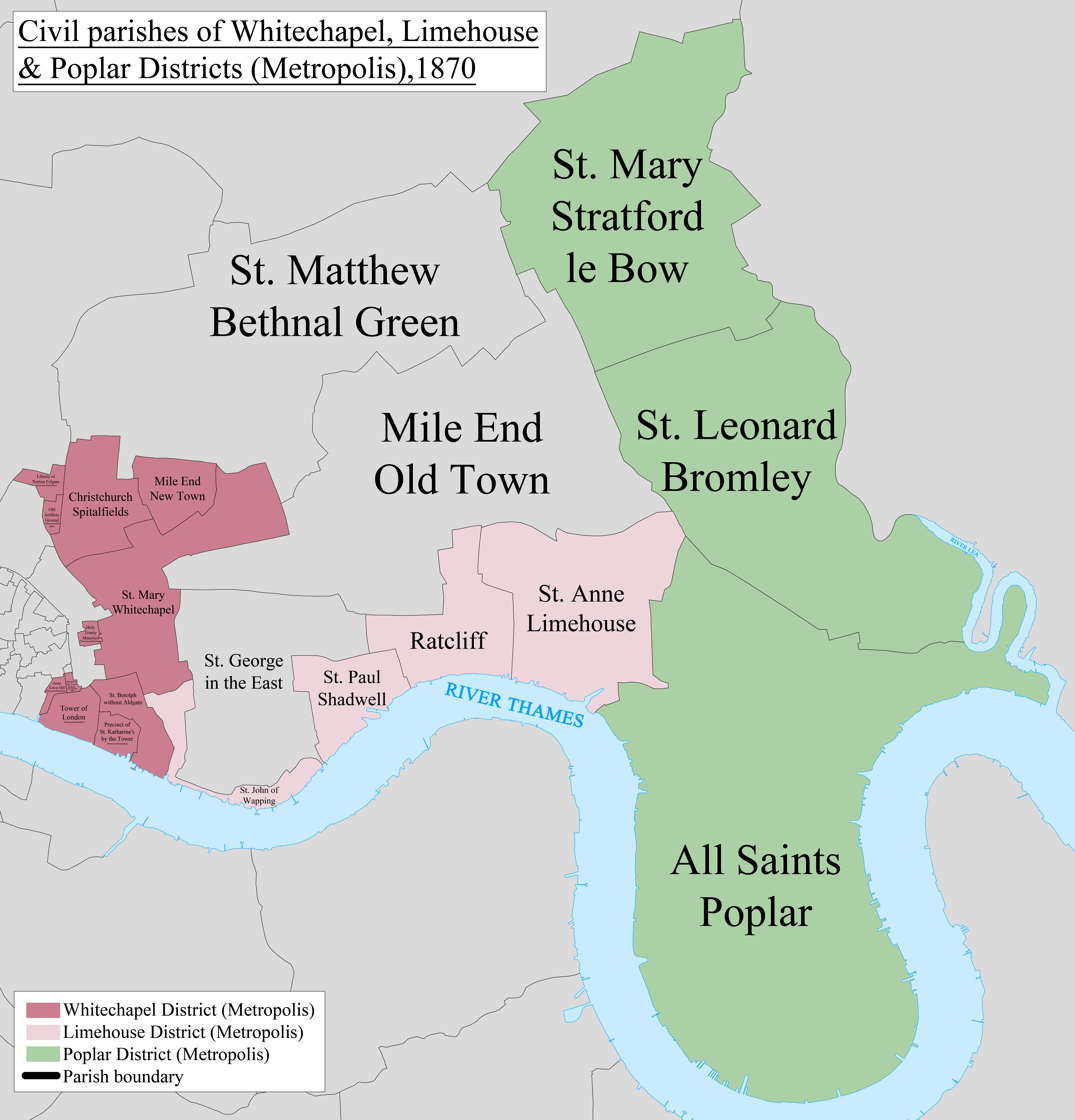
A map showing the civil parish boundaries in 1870.

Minories was in the ancient parish of St Botolph without Aldgate until 1557, when it became extra-parochial.

The area was a papal peculiar outside the jurisdiction of the English bishops. The abbey was dissolved in 1539, the property passing to the Crown. The chapel of the former abbey became the Church of Holy Trinity, Minories, and other buildings were used as an armoury and later as a workhouse. In 1686, the area became part of the Liberties of the Tower of London. The Minories area historically hosted a large Jewish community.

Minories Holy Trinity was abolished as a civil parish in 1895 and absorbed into the parish of Whitechapel. The parish took its name from Holy Trinity Minories church, just off St Clare St, which was built 1706 on the site of an earlier church but destroyed during the Blitz in 1940.

== The street ==
The modern street named Minories runs north–south with traffic flowing both-ways from Aldgate to Tower Hill; it is part of the A1211 road between the Barbican and Whitechapel. The border between the City and the London Borough of Tower Hamlets ran haphazardly between Minories and nearby Mansell Street until boundary changes in 1994 relocated the present-day border along Mansell Street, so that Minories is now within the City of London. Aldgate Underground station is at the northern end of Minories, on Aldgate High Street.

=== Roman cemetery ===
In September 2013, a well-preserved Roman statue of an eagle with a snake in its mouth, thought to have been part of a funerary monument, was discovered on a building site on the street, close to its junction with Aldgate High Street. Burials were forbidden within the inhabited area in the Roman period, so the city's defensive wall was ringed by many large cemeteries. The statue is considered to be one of the best examples of Romano-British sculpture in existence.

=== Minories railway station ===
The street gave its name to Minories railway station, built in 1840 as a part of the London and Blackwall Railway – a 3.5-mile (5.6 km) cable railway. The site is now occupied by the Docklands Light Railway (DLR) station Tower Gateway, which opened in 1987 as the system's western terminus. The DLR was extended westward in 1991 to Bank, leaving Tower Gateway as a secondary alternative terminus.

== Sources ==
- Pennant, Thomas (1816). Some Account of London. London: J Faulder (digital edition from New York Public Library, 2007). p. 372.
- Thornbury, Walter (1878). Old and New London: Volume 2. London: Cassel (digital edition from University of London & History of Parliament Trust, 2007). pp. 245–250.
